= Málaga =

Municipality in Andalusia, Spain

- Municipality
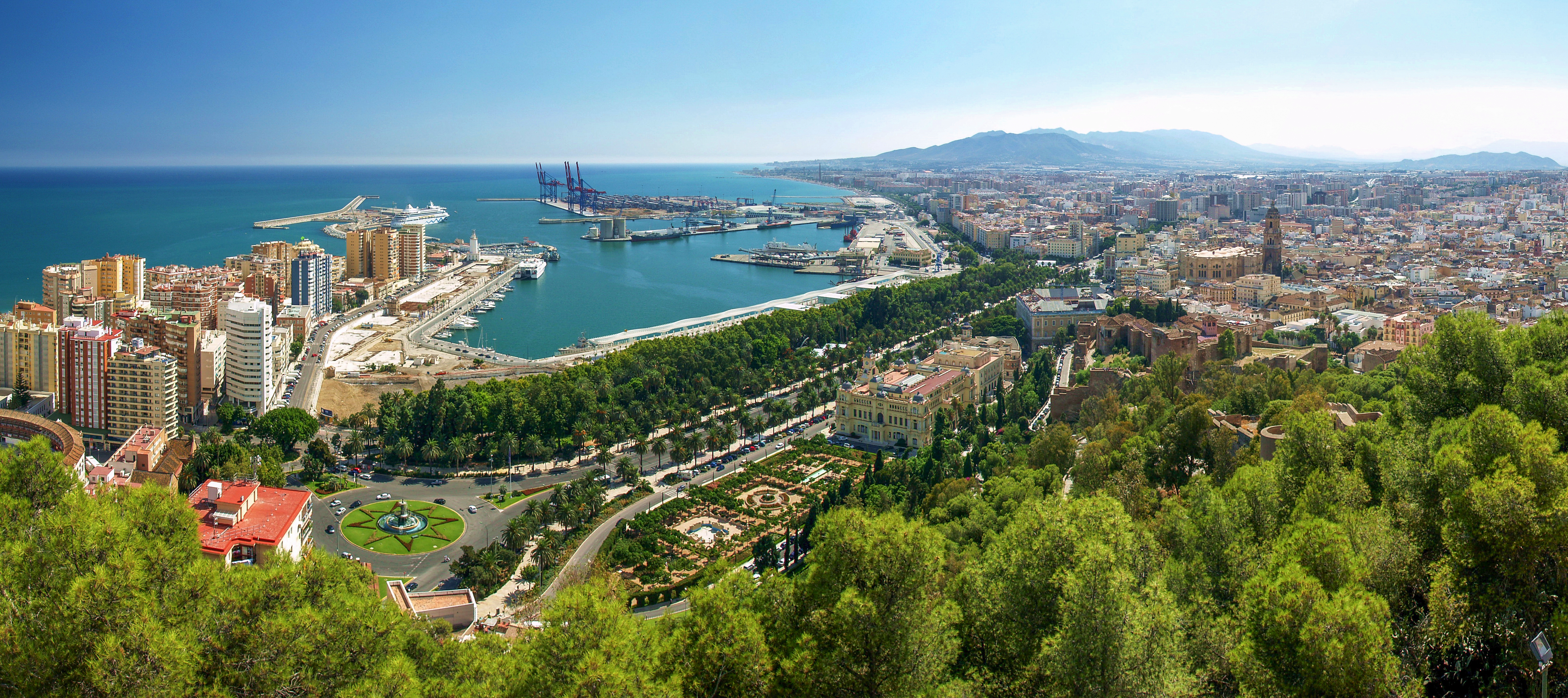
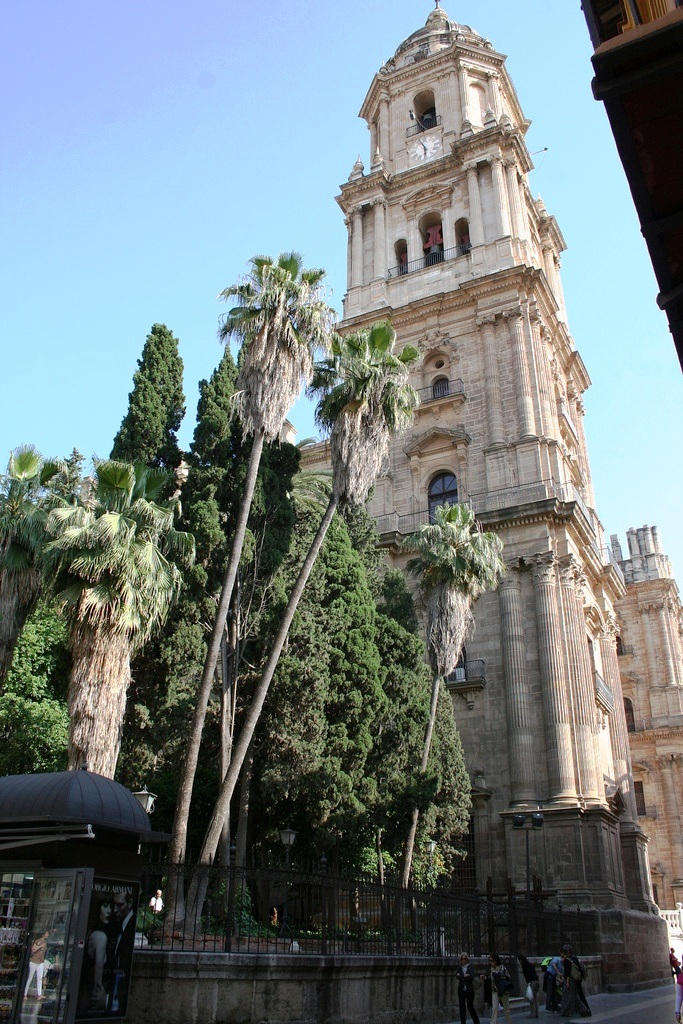
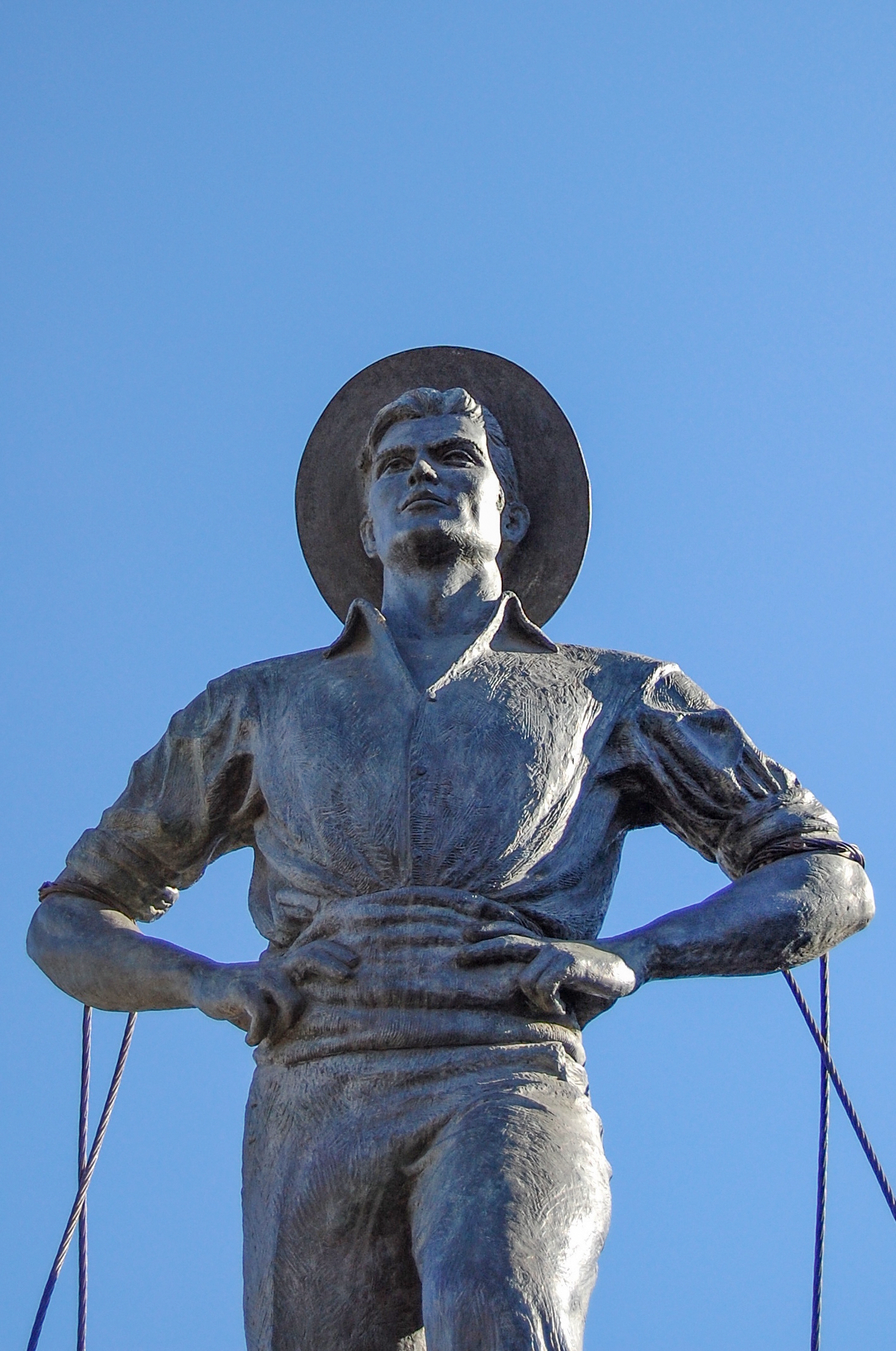
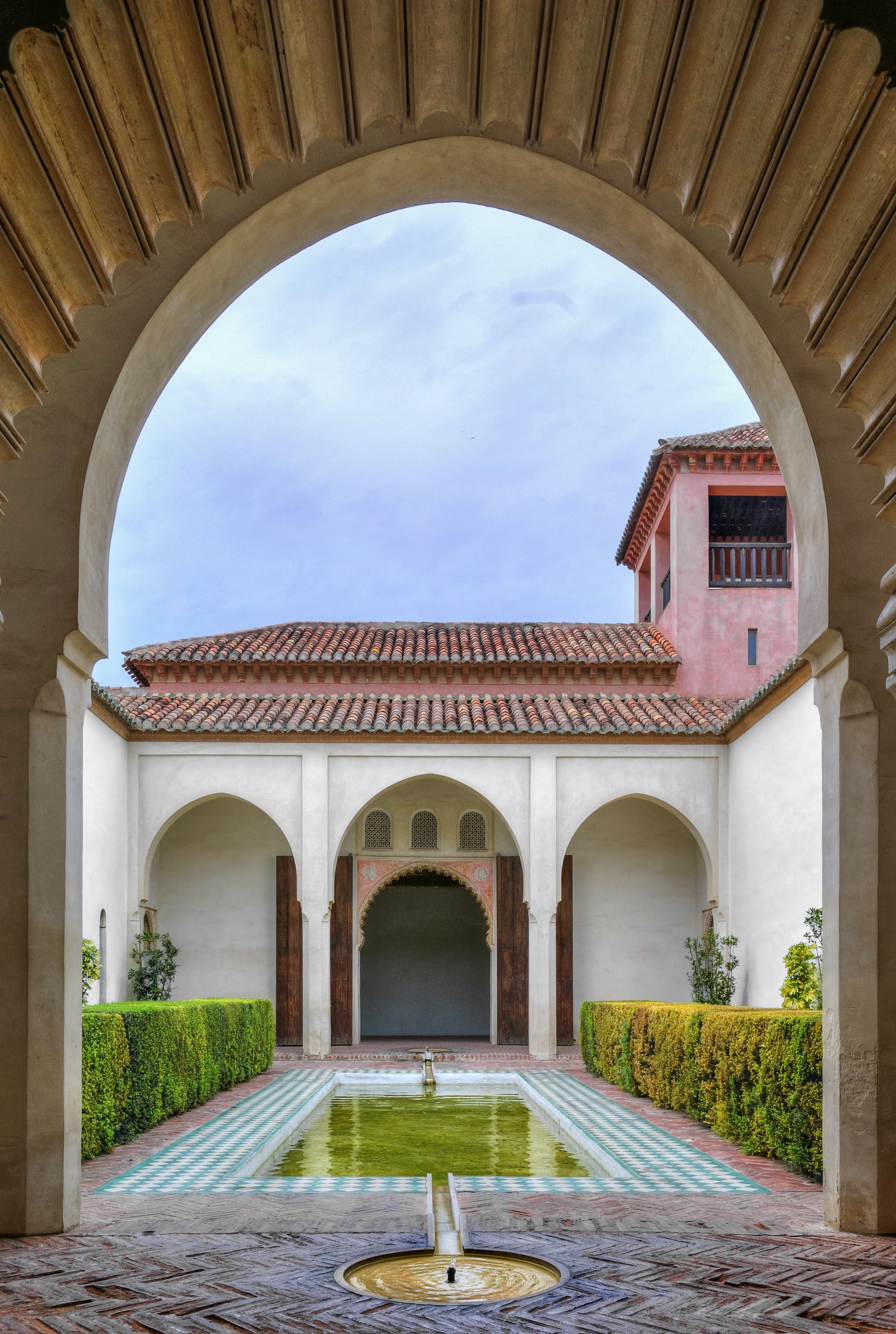
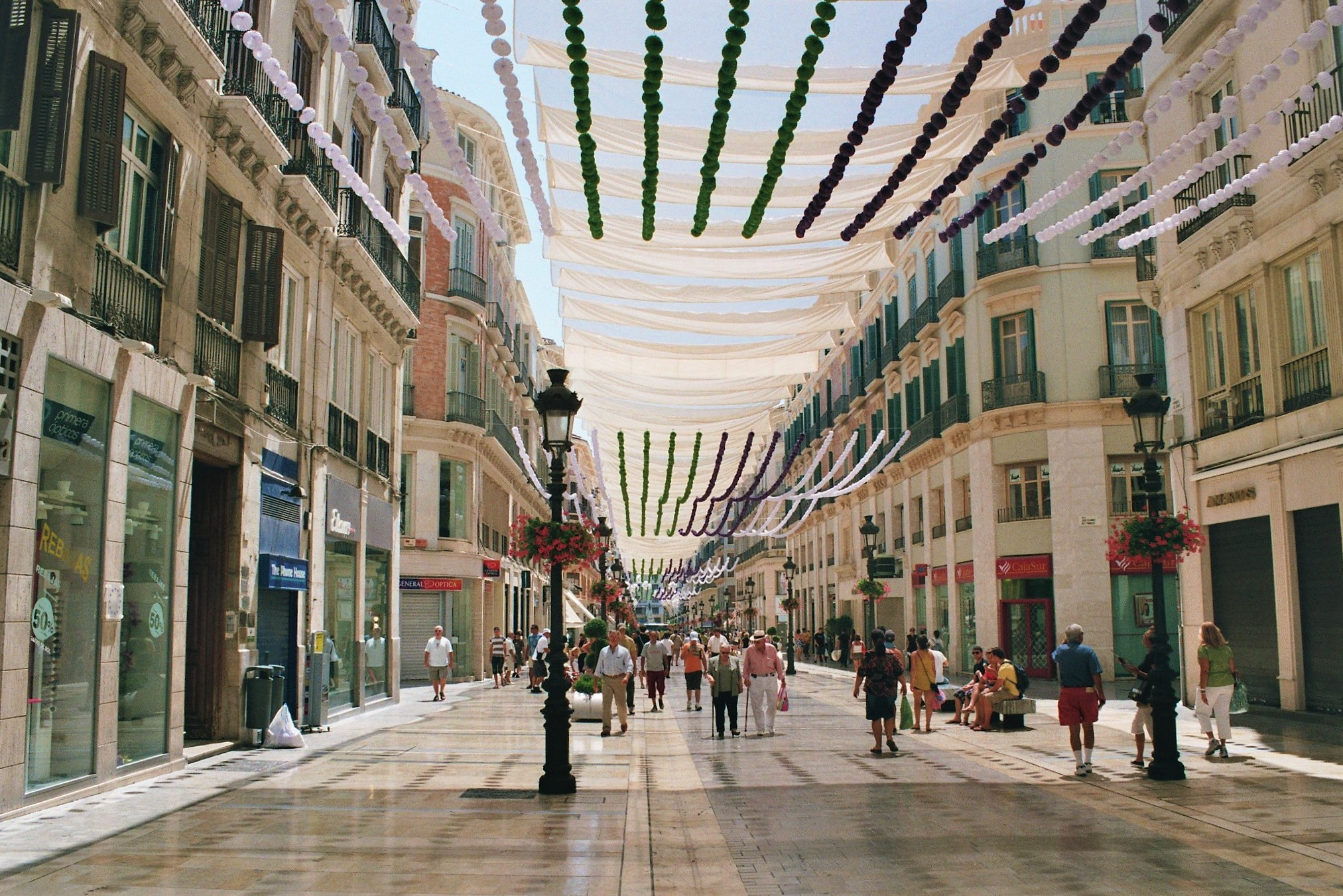
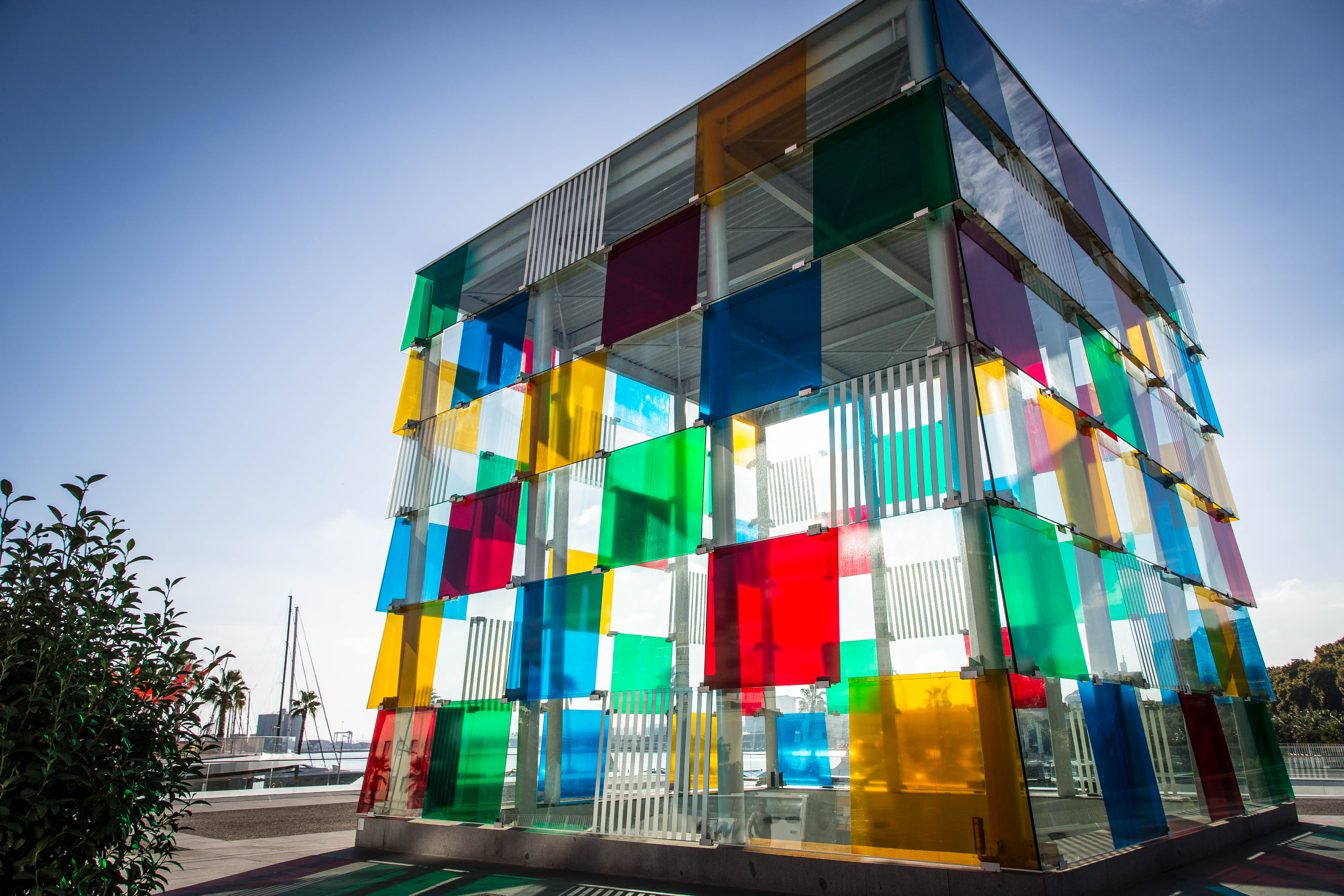
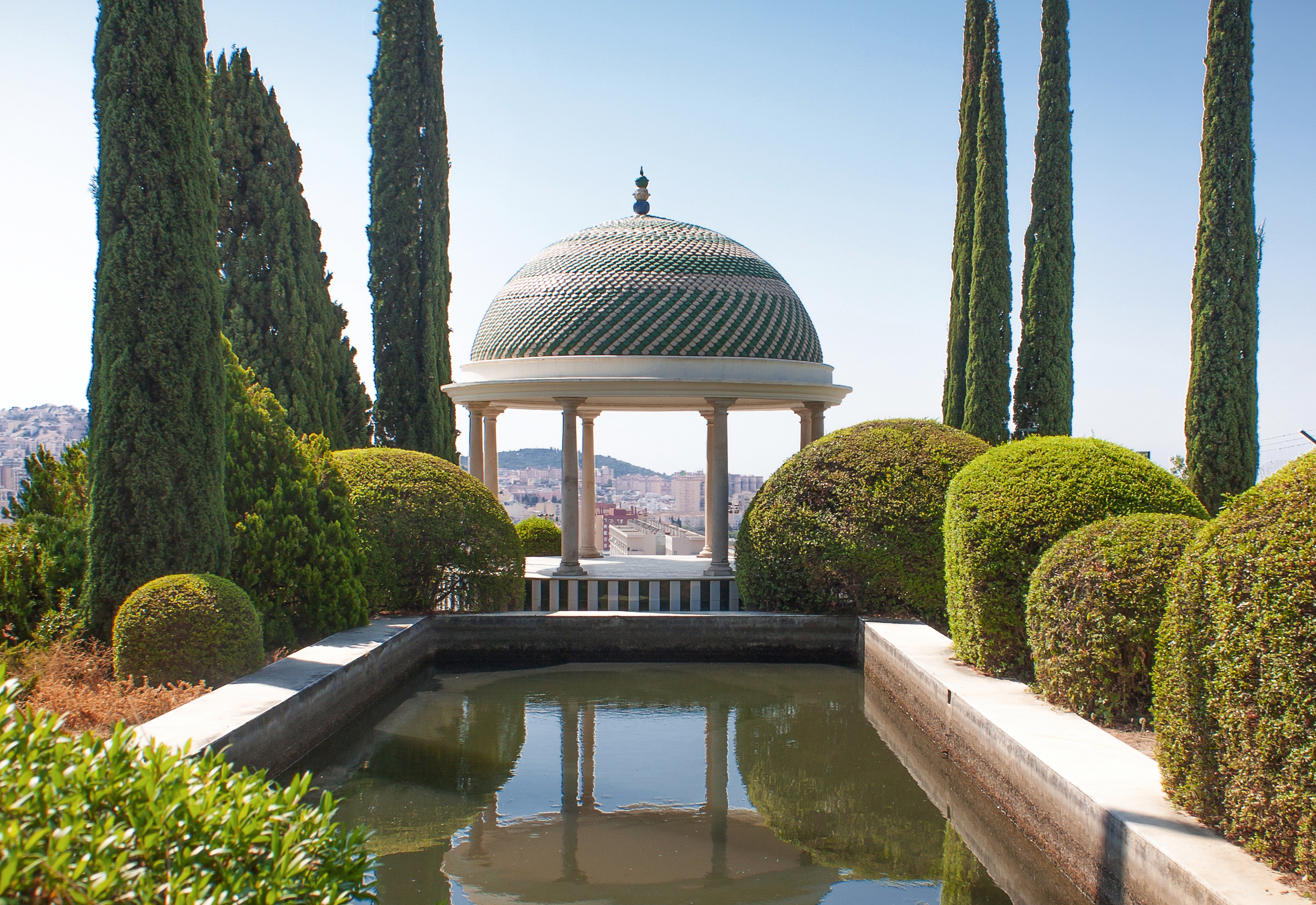
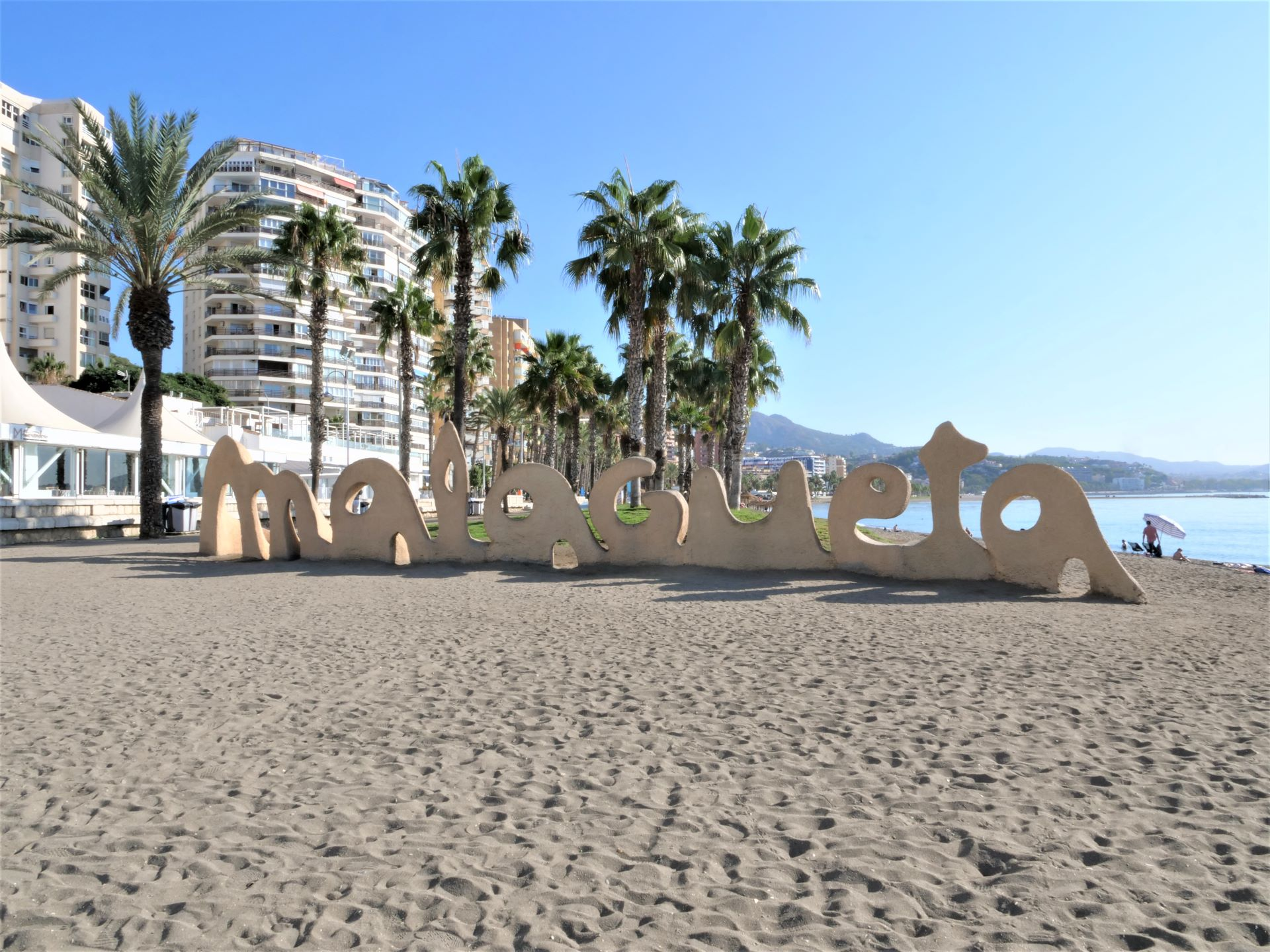
- View from Gibralfaro Cathedral of the Incarnation El Cenachero Alcazaba Calle Marqués de Larios Centre Pompidou Botanical Garden La Malagueta Beach

- Flag Coat of arms
- Location of Málaga
- Coordinates: 36°43′10″N 4°25′12″W
- Country: Spain
- Autonomous community: Andalusia
- Province: Málaga
- Founded: 8th century BC

Government
  - Type: Ayuntamiento
  - Body: City Council of Málaga
  - Mayor: Francisco de la Torre Prados (PP)

Area
  - Municipality: 395.55 km^{2} (152.72 sq mi)
  - Urban: 827 km^{2} (319 sq mi)
- Elevation: 11 m (36 ft)
- Highest elevation (Pico Reina): 1,031 m (3,383 ft)
- Lowest elevation (Mediterranean Sea): 0 m (0 ft)

Population (2025)
  - Municipality: 597,173
  - Rank: 6th in Spain
  - Density: 1,509.7/km^{2} (3,910.2/sq mi)
  - Urban: 855,609
  - Urban density: 1,030/km^{2} (2,680/sq mi)
  - Metro: 1,100,000
  - Seat/Locality: 551,480

GDP
  - Metro: €28.244 billion (2020)
- Time zone: UTC+1 (CET)
  - Summer (DST): UTC+2 (CEST)
- Postcode: 29001-29018
- Calling code: +34 (Spain) 95 (Málaga)
- Website: www.malaga.eu

Málaga (/ˈmæləɡə/; Spanish: [ˈmalaɣa]) is a municipality of Spain and the capital of the province of Málaga, in the autonomous community of Andalusia. With a population of 597,173 in 2025, it is the 2nd-largest city in Andalusia and the 6th-largest in the country. It lies in Southern Iberia on the Costa del Sol ('Coast of the Sun') of the Mediterranean, primarily on the left bank of the Guadalhorce. The urban core originally developed in the space between the Gibralfaro Hill and the Guadalmedina.

Málaga's history spans about 2,800 years, making it one of the oldest continuously inhabited cities in Western Europe. According to most scholars, it was founded about 770 BC by the Phoenicians from Tyre as Malaka. From the 6th century BC the city was under the hegemony of Ancient Carthage, and from 218 BC, it was under Roman rule, economically prospering owing to garum production. In the 8th century, after a period of Visigothic and Byzantine rule, it was placed under Islamic rule. In 1487, the Crown of Castile gained control in the midst of the Granada War. In the 19th century, the city underwent a period of industrialisation followed by a decay in all socioeconomic parameters in the last third of the century.

The most important business sectors in Málaga are tourism, construction and technology services, but other sectors such as transportation and logistics are beginning to expand. Málaga has consolidated as a tech hub, with companies mainly concentrated in the Málaga TechPark (Technology Park of Andalusia). It hosts the headquarters of the region's largest bank, Unicaja, and it is the fourth-ranking city in Spain in terms of economic activity. Regarding transportation, Málaga is served by the Málaga–Costa del Sol Airport and the Port of Málaga, and the city was connected to the high-speed railway network in 2007.

== History ==
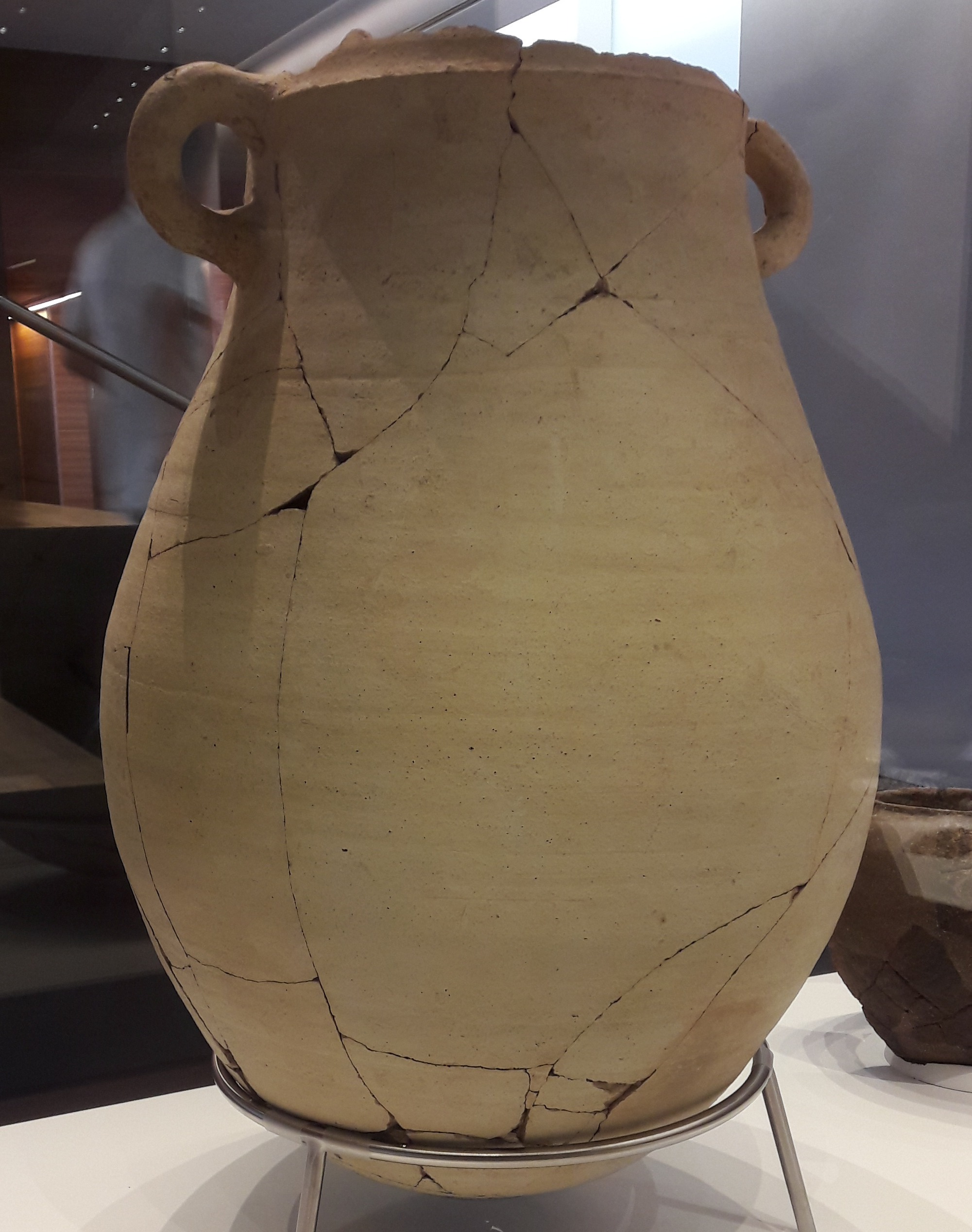
Clay amphora from the Cerro del Villar site, near the mouth of the Guadalhorce (6th century BC).

Phoenicians from Tyre founded a colony named Malake about 770 BC (Punic: 𐤌𐤋𐤊𐤀, mlkʾ). The town controlled access to the Guadalmedina and served as a waypoint on trade routes between Phoenicia and the Strait of Gibraltar. Like other Phoenician colonies, it fell under Carthaginian rule during the 6th or 5th century BC. The Phoenician and Later Roman urban core developed around an area running from the Gibralfaro Hill to the mouth of the Malaca flumen (Guadalmedina).

After the Punic Wars, the Roman Republic took control of the town known to them as Malaca. By the 1st century BC, Strabo alluded to its Phoenician profile, in contrast to the hellenised characteristics of the neighbouring settlement of Mainake.

Transformed into a confederated city, it was under a special law, the Lex Flavia Malacitana. A Roman theatre was built at this time. After the fall of the Western Roman Empire, it was ruled first by the Visigoths. The city was taken c. 552 by the Byzantine Empire; either Malaca or Carthago Nova possibly then becoming the capital of the province of Spania. The Byzantines restored and expanded the docks, thus consolidating the fishing and trading tradition the city already enjoyed. The city was retaken by the Visigoth King Sisebut in 615. The Islamic conquest of Málaga (rendered as مالقة—Mālaqah—in Arab sources) by Arab and Berber forces took place in 711 or perhaps 713. Following a period of diminished importance during the early stages of the emiral period already in force since before the conquest, Málaga was fully Islamised by the end of the aforementioned period in the wake of Muhammad I's attributed intervention in the urban configuration as a medina.

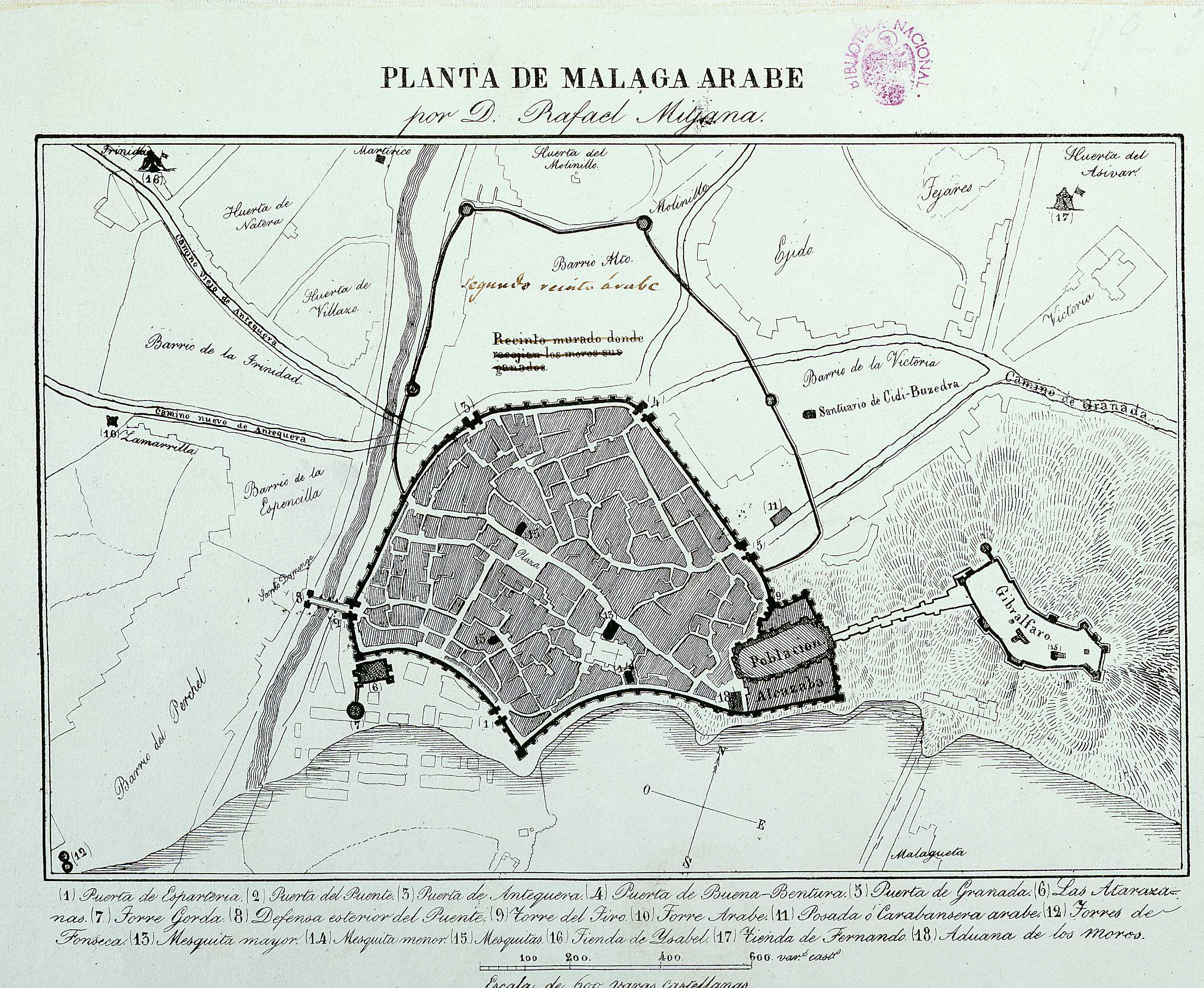
A 19th-century reconstruction of Islamic Malaqah

The consolidation of the city's importance after 930 (under the Caliphate of Córdoba) ran parallel to the diminishing fortune of Archidona, the latter of which Málaga replaced as the capital of the corresponding kura of Rayya. The early 10th-century chronicle of Aḥmad al-Rāzī mentions the vineyards of Málaga, extolling the unparalleled quality of its raisins. In the 11th century, following the unravelling of Umayyad authority across the caliphate, Málaga became a centre of power of the Hammudids, who established a petty kingdom (nominally also a caliphate) in the city, the taifa of Málaga, complemented by the also Hammudid sister dominion in Ceuta across the Strait of Gibraltar. The city was seized away from the Hammudids by the Granadan Zirids in 1056 or 1057, and also underwent an ephemeral spell under the Sevillian Abbadids by 1066 before returning to the former. By the late 11th century, the Zirids lost the city to the North African Almoravids.

The traveller Ibn Battuta, who passed through around 1325, characterised it as "one of the largest and most beautiful towns of Andalusia [uniting] the conveniences of both sea and land, and... abundantly supplied with foodstuffs and fruits". He praised its grapes, figs, and almonds; "its ruby-coloured Murcian pomegranates have no equal in the world." Another exported product was its "excellent gilded pottery". The town's mosque was large, with "exceptionally tall orange trees" in its courtyard.

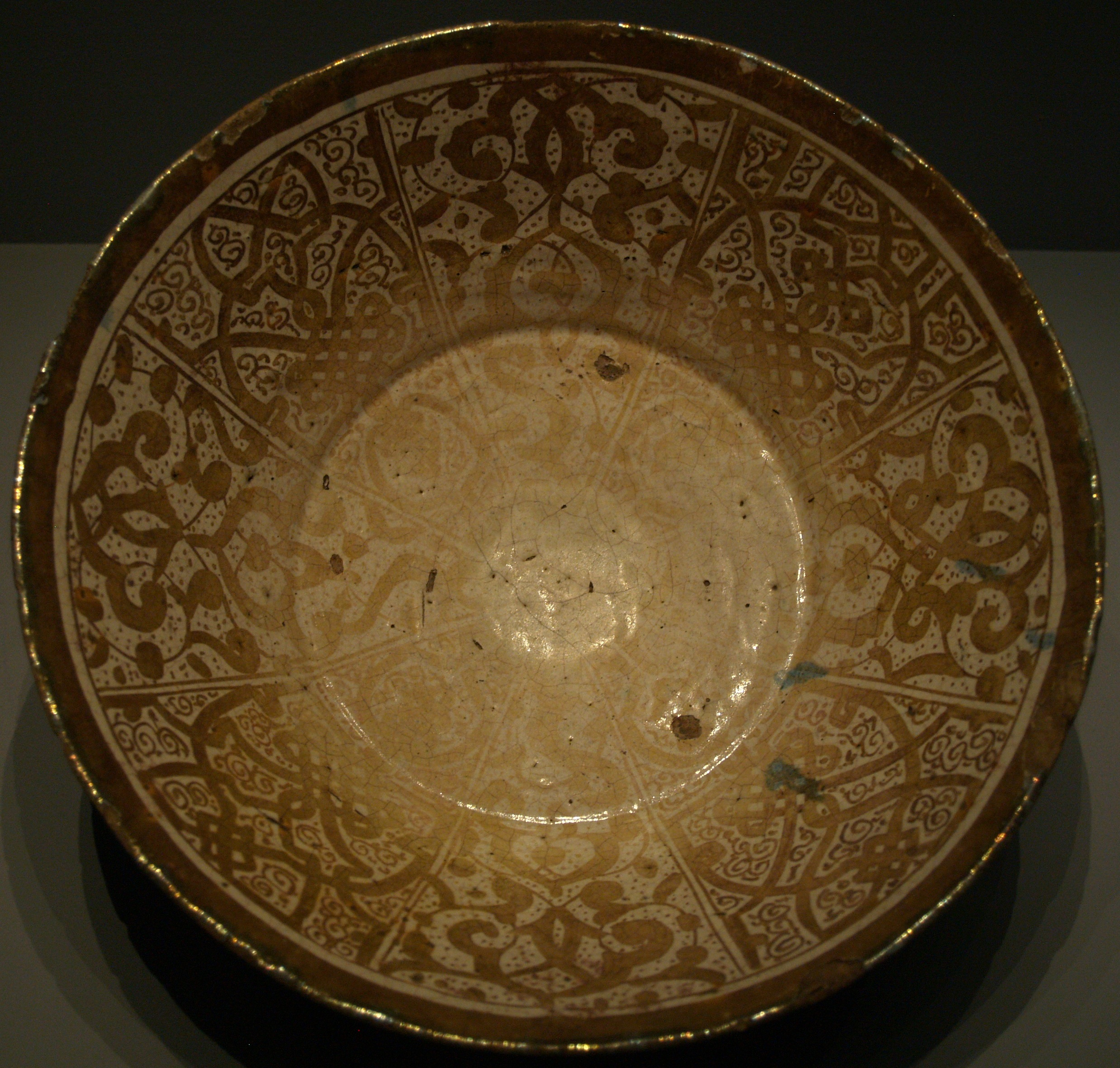
Ceramic plate from Málaga (14th century)

After the formation of the Nasrid Kingdom of Granada in the 13th century, Málaga became a part of it. The export-oriented harbour traded silk fabrics, dry nuts (raisins, almonds and the famous Rayya figs, reportedly exported to as far as China), wine, cutlery, leather and the famous regional lustreware.

In the 15th century, Málaga was the main Nasrid port (followed by Almería), featuring a notable presence of Genoese merchants. It played a role both as stopover of the Atlantic international trade (as part of the routes connecting the Central Mediterranean to the North Atlantic) and as regional trading cog of the Kingdom of Granada. By the last rales of Nasrid rule, the city had a population of about 15,000.

Málaga was seized by Christian forces on 18 August 1487, after a 3-month 11 days siege, in what was the most violent episode of the Granada War. The Muslim inhabitants resisted assaults and artillery bombardments before hunger forced them to surrender; practically the entire remaining population (around 11,000 people) became war captives and were sold into slavery in other Andalusian cities as well as Valencia and Barcelona. The Jewish population was also taken prisoner and held in Carmona, and a ransom was imposed on them, partly covered by their own assets and partly collected through emissaries. Only a minority of around 50 people led by merchant Alí Dordux were allowed to remain in the city.

The city was swiftly repopulated by Christian settlers coming from different locations of the Iberian Peninsula. Málaga became an exporting centre for Andalusia via the link of the city with Antequera and Córdoba, maintaining its trading character despite the nearly complete replacement of the population. The city did not escape a series of typhus fever outbreaks following its annexation to the Crown of Castile.

Following the death of regent Ferdinand the city rose in revolt in 1516 on the occasion of the installment of a new court controlled by the Admiral of Castile. It was only on 2 December 1530 when Málaga was freed from the influence of the Admiralty for good, confirming the privileges granted in the past by the Catholic Monarchs.

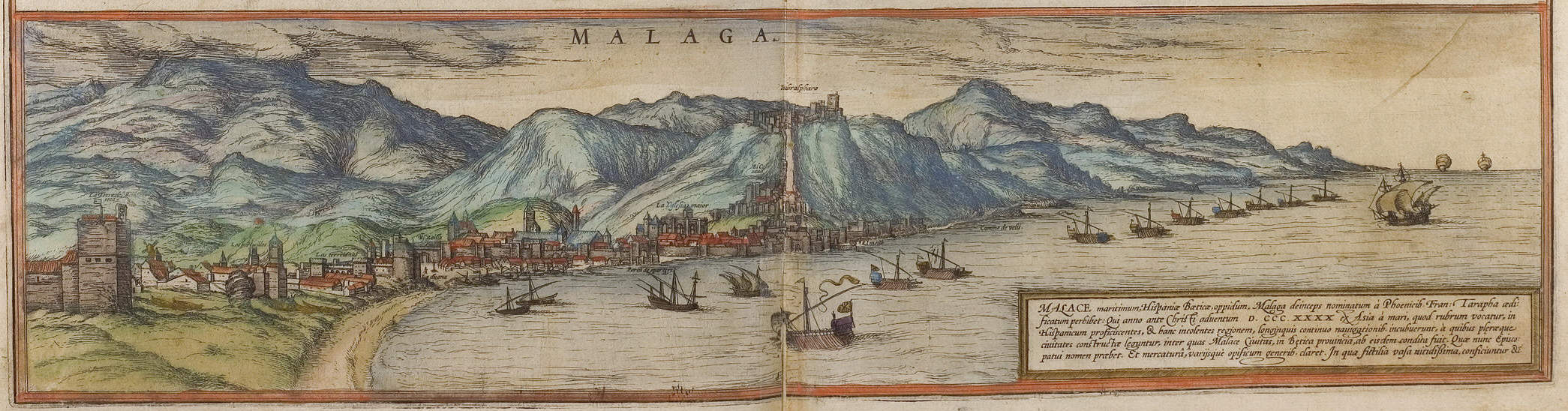
Málaga in 1572: Castle of Gibralfaro (center)

As of 1625, Málaga may have had a population of around 36,000.

On 24 August 1704 the indecisive Battle of Málaga, the largest naval battle in the War of the Spanish Succession, took place in the sea south of Málaga.

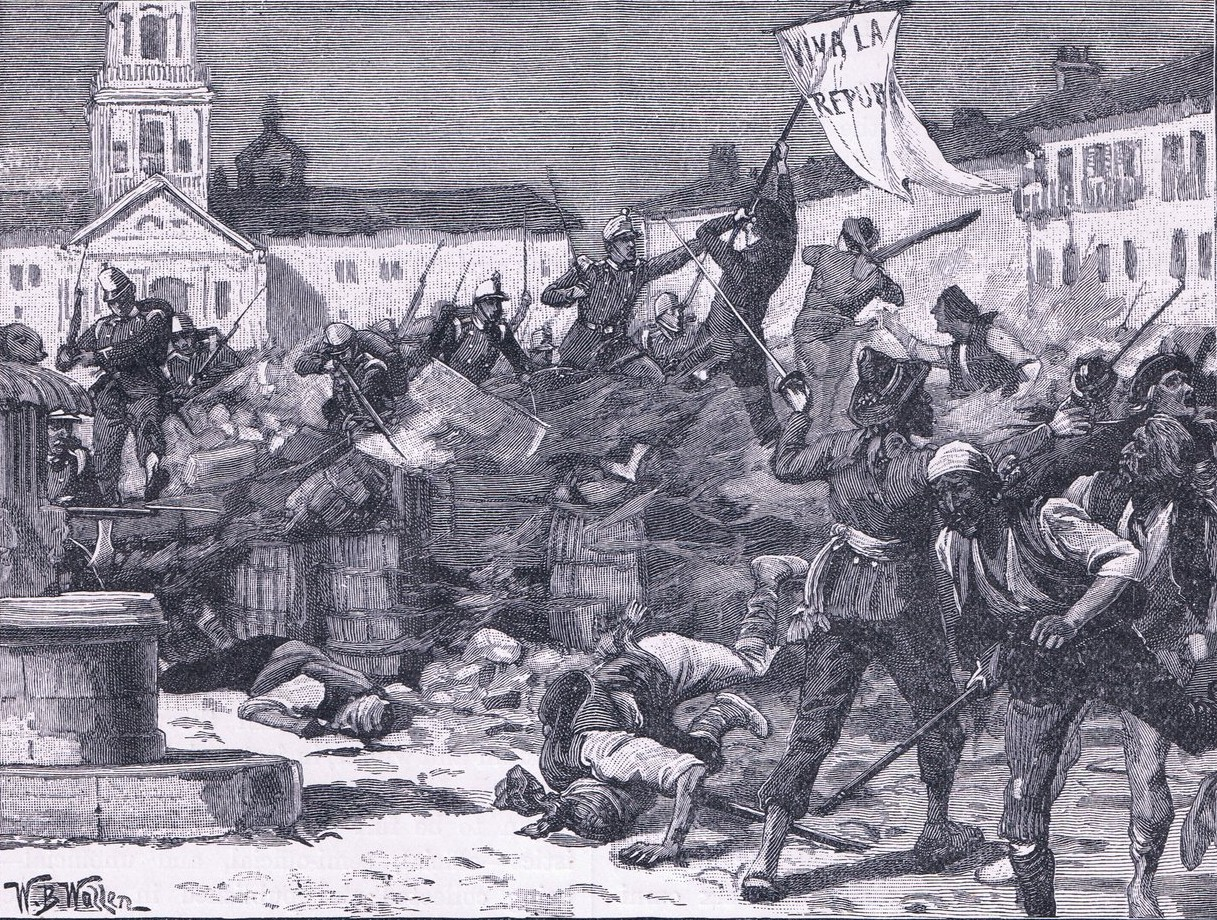
Street fighting in Málaga during the Glorious Revolution in 1868

The city's economy profited from an early industrialisation in the first third of the 19th century and the population steadily increased until the last years of the century, when the population decreased between 1887 and 1897 due to the economic crisis induced by the Phylloxera grapevine pest. The century saw the accumulation of capital in an enriched bourgeoisie class, that invested in the incipient industrial development.

The municipality of Málaga annexed the coastal town of Torremolinos in 1924.

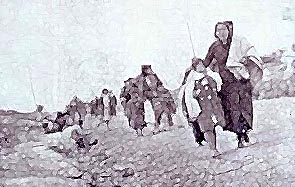
Republican refugees fleeing Málaga during the Desbandá (8 February 1937).

After the coup of July 1936 the government of the Second Republic retained control of Málaga. Its harbour was a base of the Republican navy at the beginning of the Spanish Civil War. It suffered heavy bombing by Italian warships which took part in breaking the Republican navy's blockade of Nationalist-held Spanish Morocco and took part in naval bombardment of Republican-held Málaga. After the Battle of Málaga and the Francoist takeover in February 1937, over seven thousand people were killed, as they were trying to flee the city through the road to Almería. (Note: The well-known British journalist and writer Arthur Koestler was captured by the Nationalist forces on their entry into Málaga, which formed the material for his book Spanish Testament. The first chapters of the book include an eye-witness account of the 1937 fall of Málaga to Francisco Franco's armies during the Spanish Civil War.)

Torremolinos—originally a small coastal town—greatly developed in the late 1950s and early 1960s, becoming an international tourist centre. The first gay bar in Spain was opened in Torremolinos in 1962 (and the first lesbian club in 1968), and the place acquired a lively LGBT life, to the point of being described as "the most 'cosmopolitan' and gay-friendly place in all of Spain". Nearly a decade after, in 1971, a police crackdown seeking to curb "offences against public morality and decency" largely put an end to the appeal of the place, only regaining its status as hub of LGBT leisure and tourism after the death of the dictator.

Torremolinos became independent from the municipality of Málaga in September 1988.

== Geography ==
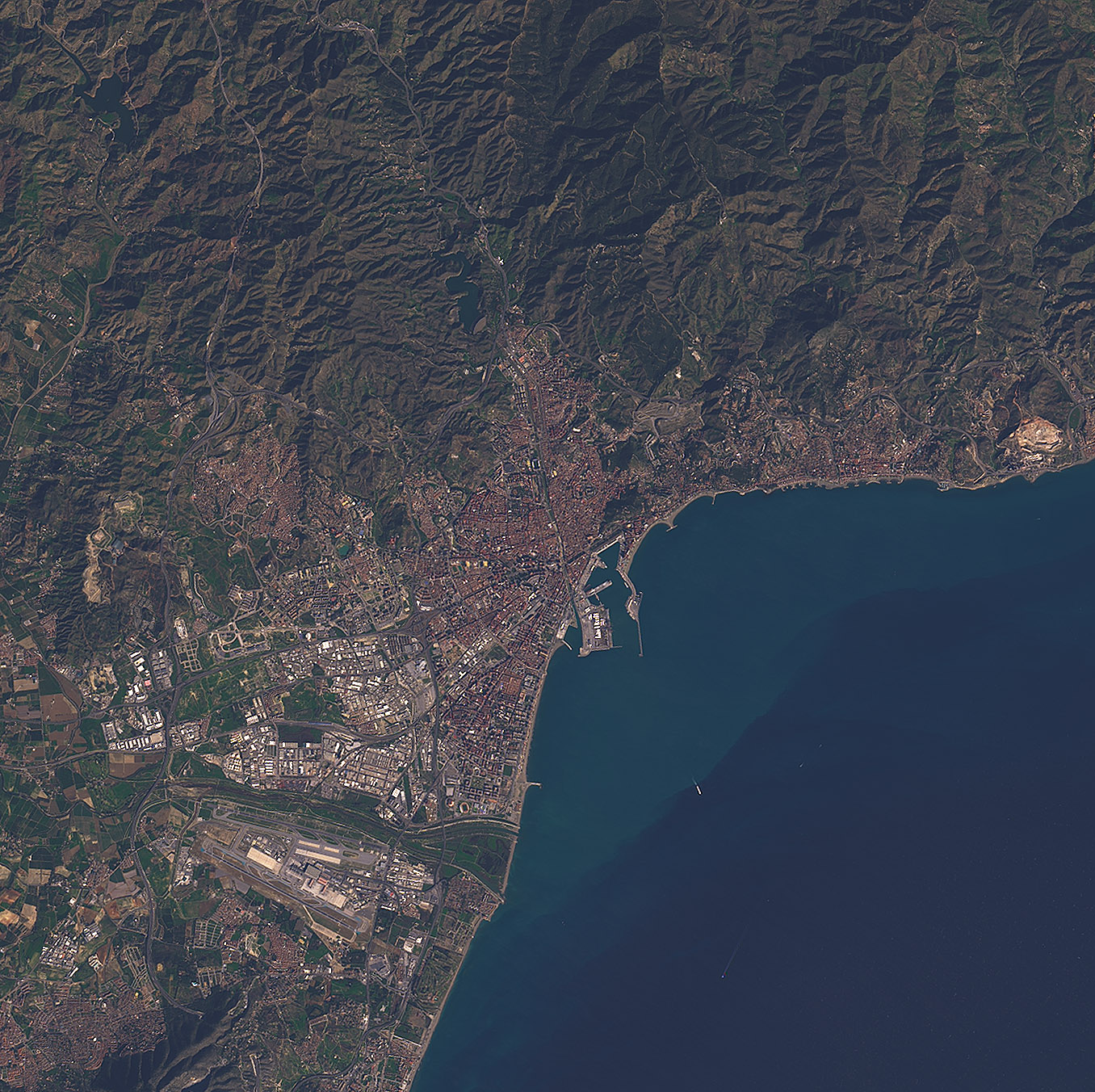
Satellite view centered on Málaga

Málaga is located in the south of the Iberian Peninsula, on the Costa del Sol (Coast of the Sun) on the northern side of the Alboran Sea (the westernmost portion of the Mediterranean Sea). It lies about 100 kilometres (62 miles) east of the Strait of Gibraltar and about 130 kilometres (81 miles) east of Tarifa (the southernmost point of continental Europe) and about 130 km (81 miles) to the north of Africa.

The Montes de Málaga mountain range (part of the Penibaetic System) is located in the northeast of the municipality. The highest point in the range (and in the municipality) is the Pico Reina, rising up to 1,031 m (3,383 ft) above sea level.

The city centre is located around the mouth of the Guadalmedina and close to the Guadalhorce's mouth (where the airport is located). The Totalán Creek constitutes the eastern boundary of Málaga with the municipality of Rincón de la Victoria.

The Gibralfaro is a 130 m (427 ft) high foothill from which the Gibralfaro Castle and the Alcazaba fortress overlook the city.

=== Climate ===
Málaga's climate is a Mediterranean climate (Köppen climate classification Csa, Trewartha: Csal) with mild winters, during which most of the year's rainfall occurs, and hot summers with very little rainfall. Summer to early-autumn tends to be moderately humid, due to the evaporation of warm water off the adjacent Mediterranean Sea being blown on shore by a sea breeze. This humidity is most pronounced at this time of year as the sea water is at its warmest in relation to the rest of the year. On particularly humid days, which occasionally occurs, the apparent temperature feels higher than the actual temperature would suggest, especially when the wind is light. When the wind is stronger, this effect is lessened somewhat, and the heat feels more manageable. Málaga enjoys plenty of sunshine throughout the year, with an average of about 300 days of sunshine and only about 40–45 with precipitation annually.

Málaga experiences the warmest winters of any European city with a population over 500,000. The average maximum temperature during the day in the period from December to February is 17–18 °C (63–64 °F). During the winter, the Málaga Mountains (Montes de Málaga) block the passage of cold winds from the north. Its average annual temperature is 23.6 °C (74.5 °F) during the day and 14.2 °C (57.6 °F) at night. In the coldest month, January, the temperature ranges from 14 to 20 °C (57 to 68 °F) during the day, 5 to 10 °C (41 to 50 °F) at night and the average sea temperature is 16 °C (61 °F). In the warmest month, August, the temperature ranges from 26 to 34 °C (79 to 93 °F) during the day, above 20 °C (68 °F) at night and the average sea temperature is 23 °C (73 °F).

Large fluctuations in temperature are rare. The highest temperature ever recorded at the airport was 44.2 °C (111.6 °F) on 18 July 1978, equalled on 19 July 2023. In August 1881, the average reported daytime maximum temperature was a record 34.8 °C (94.6 °F). The lowest temperature ever recorded was −3.8 °C (25.2 °F) on 4 February 1954. The highest wind speed ever recorded was on 16 July 1980, measuring 119 km/h (73.94 mph). Snowfall is virtually unknown; since the beginning of the 20th century, Málaga city has only recorded snow on one day, on 2 February 1954.

Annual average relative humidity is 65%, ranging from 58% in June to 72% in December. Yearly sunshine hours average between 2,800 and 3,000 per year, from 5–6 hours of sunshine per day in December to average 11 hours of sunshine per day in July.

At Málaga Airport weather station, annual wind speeds average from 14 km/h (8.70 mph) in December, January and February, to 10 km/h (6.21 mph) in September and October. Atmospheric pressure averages from 1015 mbar in July and August to 1023 mbar in January. Visibility averages either 11 or 12 km in all months. The strongest gust of wind recorded at this station was 130 km/h (80.78 mph) on 27 January 1948 at 02:30. On 12 December 2023, Málaga broke Spain's and Europe's all-time December temperature record, setting a new record of 29.9 °C (85.8 °F) at the AEMET station of Málaga and 29.6 °C (85.3 °F) at the airport of Málaga.

Climate data for Málaga Airport (AGP), Churriana coordinates 36°39′58″N 04°28′56″W; elevation: 6 m (20 ft); (1991–2020, extremes 1942–present)
Month	Jan	Feb	Mar	Apr	May	Jun	Jul	Aug	Sep	Oct	Nov	Dec	Year
Record high °C (°F)	26.8 (80.2)	30.0 (86.0)	31.4 (88.5)	34.3 (93.7)	35.6 (96.1)	41.0 (105.8)	44.2 (111.6)	44.0 (111.2)	40.0 (104.0)	36.3 (97.3)	30.4 (86.7)	29.9 (85.8)	44.2 (111.6)
Mean maximum °C (°F)	22.0 (71.6)	23.3 (73.9)	26.2 (79.2)	28.3 (82.9)	31.6 (88.9)	35.6 (96.1)	38.7 (101.7)	39.2 (102.6)	35.0 (95.0)	30.3 (86.5)	25.4 (77.7)	22.4 (72.3)	40.1 (104.2)
Mean daily maximum °C (°F)	17.2 (63.0)	17.9 (64.2)	19.7 (67.5)	21.8 (71.2)	24.7 (76.5)	28.5 (83.3)	31.0 (87.8)	31.5 (88.7)	28.4 (83.1)	24.3 (75.7)	20.2 (68.4)	17.8 (64.0)	23.6 (74.5)
Daily mean °C (°F)	12.5 (54.5)	13.2 (55.8)	14.9 (58.8)	16.8 (62.2)	19.8 (67.6)	23.6 (74.5)	26.1 (79.0)	26.7 (80.1)	23.8 (74.8)	19.9 (67.8)	15.8 (60.4)	13.4 (56.1)	18.9 (66.0)
Mean daily minimum °C (°F)	7.9 (46.2)	8.4 (47.1)	10.1 (50.2)	11.9 (53.4)	14.9 (58.8)	18.6 (65.5)	21.2 (70.2)	22.0 (71.6)	19.2 (66.6)	15.4 (59.7)	11.4 (52.5)	9.1 (48.4)	14.2 (57.5)
Mean minimum °C (°F)	2.8 (37.0)	3.4 (38.1)	5.2 (41.4)	7.9 (46.2)	10.5 (50.9)	14.9 (58.8)	18.0 (64.4)	18.4 (65.1)	14.8 (58.6)	10.7 (51.3)	6.0 (42.8)	3.7 (38.7)	1.8 (35.2)
Record low °C (°F)	−2.6 (27.3)	−3.8 (25.2)	−1.2 (29.8)	2.8 (37.0)	5.0 (41.0)	9.8 (49.6)	10.0 (50.0)	12.2 (54.0)	10.2 (50.4)	5.6 (42.1)	1.4 (34.5)	−0.8 (30.6)	−3.8 (25.2)
Average precipitation mm (inches)	62.1 (2.44)	56.1 (2.21)	66.0 (2.60)	41.3 (1.63)	23.1 (0.91)	4.4 (0.17)	0.1 (0.00)	2.7 (0.11)	25.2 (0.99)	60.6 (2.39)	77.1 (3.04)	87.7 (3.45)	506.4 (19.94)
Average precipitation days (≥ 1 mm)	5.4	4.6	5.1	4.4	3.2	0.6	0.0	0.4	2.3	4.5	5.4	5.6	41.5
Average relative humidity (%)	67	66	65	62	58	56	57	59	63	70	69	71	64
Mean monthly sunshine hours	183	189	223	249	301	336	353	322	261	220	177	161	2,975
Percentage possible sunshine	58.6	61.8	60.0	63.3	68.4	76.9	79.5	77.0	69.7	63.0	57.1	53.6	65.7
Source: Agencia Estatal de Meteorología

Climate data for Málaga
Month	Jan	Feb	Mar	Apr	May	Jun	Jul	Aug	Sep	Oct	Nov	Dec	Year
Average sea temperature °C (°F)	15.9 (60.7)	15.6 (60.0)	15.6 (60.0)	16.8 (62.2)	18.4 (65.2)	21.0 (69.7)	22.9 (73.2)	23.5 (74.3)	21.9 (71.3)	20.5 (68.8)	18.1 (64.5)	16.5 (61.8)	18.9 (66.0)
Mean daily daylight hours	10.0	11.0	12.0	13.0	14.0	15.0	14.0	14.0	12.0	11.0	10.0	10.0	12.2
Average Ultraviolet index	2	4	5	7	8	10	10	9	7	5	3	2	6
Source: Weather Atlas

== Demographics ==
Historical population
Year	Pop.	±%
1842	70,725	—
1857	97,777	+38.2%
1877	120,044	+22.8%
1887	137,321	+14.4%
1900	134,849	−1.8%
1910	136,165	+1.0%
1920	151,071	+10.9%
1930	181,001	+19.8%
1940	236,067	+30.4%
1950	274,847	+16.4%
1960	296,432	+7.9%
1970	361,282	+21.9%
1981	502,232	+39.0%
1991	522,108	+4.0%
2001	524,414	+0.4%
2011	561,435	+7.1%
2021	578,063	+3.0%
Population size may be affected by changes in territorial boundaries. Source: INE

As of 2025, the population is 597,173, of which 48.0% are males, and 52.0% are females. Minors make up 16.5% of the population, and seniors make up 19.4%.

=== Immigration ===
As of 2025, immigrants make up 16.8% of the population. The 5 largest foreign countries of birth are Morocco, Argentina, Colombia, Paraguay, and Venezuela.

The number of resident foreign nationals has risen significantly in Málaga since the 1970s.

Foreign population by country of birth (2025)
Country of birth	Population
Morocco	18,105
Argentina	10,385
Colombia	7,701
Paraguay	6,998
Venezuela	6,377
Ukraine	6,333
China	2,904
France	2,701
Brazil	2,100
Italy	2,068
Russia	2,064
Germany	2,033
Cuba	1,856
Romania	1,800
United Kingdom	1,679

Metropolitan area

Population density map of the Province of Málaga.

The urban area, stretching mostly along a narrow strip of coastline, has a population of 1,066,532 on 827.33 square kilometres (319.43 sq mi) (density 1,289 inhabitants/km^{2} – 2012 data). It is formed by Málaga proper together with the following adjacent towns and municipalities: Rincón de la Victoria, Torremolinos, Benalmádena, Fuengirola, Alhaurín de la Torre, Mijas, Marbella and San Pedro Alcántara. The Málaga metropolitan area includes additional municipalities located mostly in the mountains area north of the coast and also some on the coast: Cártama, Pizarra, Coín, Monda, Ojén, Alhaurín el Grande and Estepona on west; Casabermeja on north; Totalán, Algarrobo, Torrox and Vélez-Málaga eastward from Málaga; centered Málaga urban area (Málaga, Rincón de la Victoria, Torremolinos, Benalmádena, Fuengirola, Marbella, Mijas) and Alhaurín de la Torre.

Together about 1.3 million (max. 1.6 million) people live in the Málaga metropolitan area and the number grows every year as all the municipalities and cities of the area record an annual increase in population.

== Administration ==
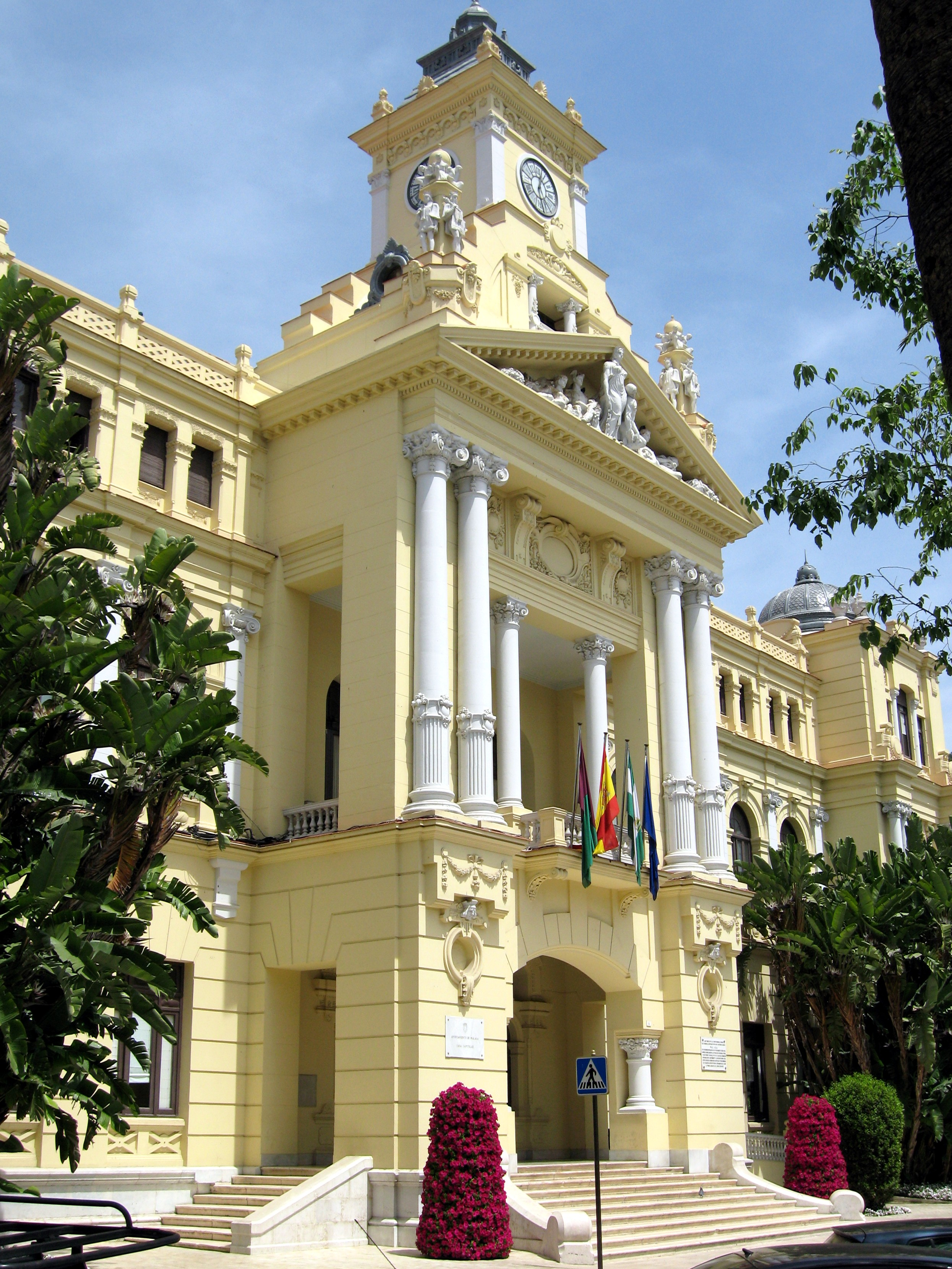
Málaga City Hall

Málaga is a municipality, the basic local administrative division in Spain. The Ayuntamiento is the body charged with the municipal government and administration. The Plenary of the ayuntamiento is formed by 31 elected municipal councillors, who in turn invest the mayor. The last municipal election took place on 26 May 2019. The current mayor is Francisco de la Torre (People's Party), who has won several mandates since becoming mayor in 2000. The city hall is located at the Casona del Parque, a Neo-Baroque building inaugurated in 1919.

=== Administrative divisions ===
Málaga is divided into 11 municipal districts.

Nº	District	Nº	District	Location
1	Centro	7	Carretera de Cádiz	
2	Este	8	Churriana	
3	Ciudad Jardín	9	Campanillas	
4	Bailén-Miraflores	10	Puerto de la Torre	
5	Palma-Palmilla	11	Teatinos-Universidad	
6	Cruz de Humilladero			

== Sights ==
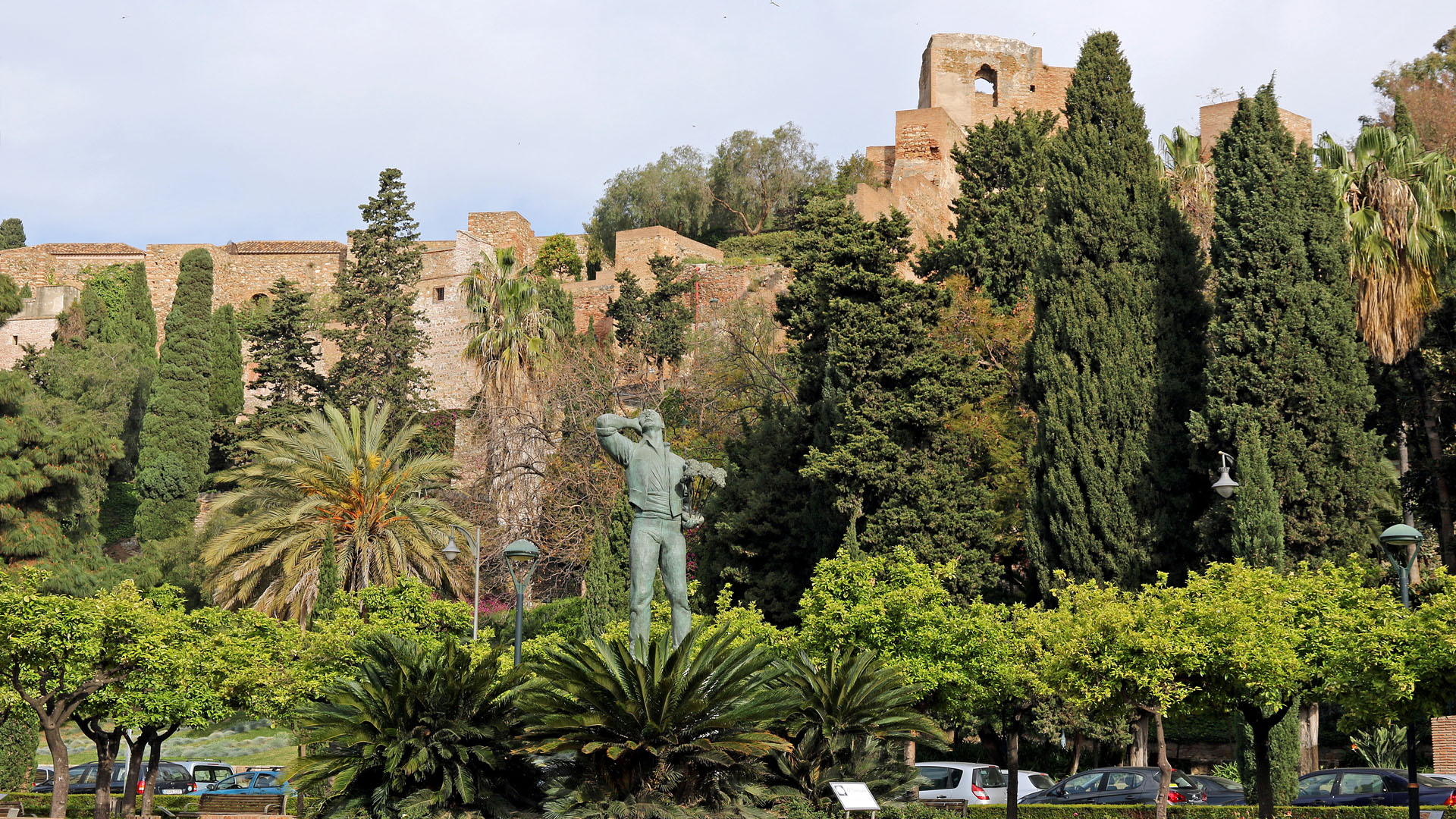
View of the old Alcazaba of Málaga

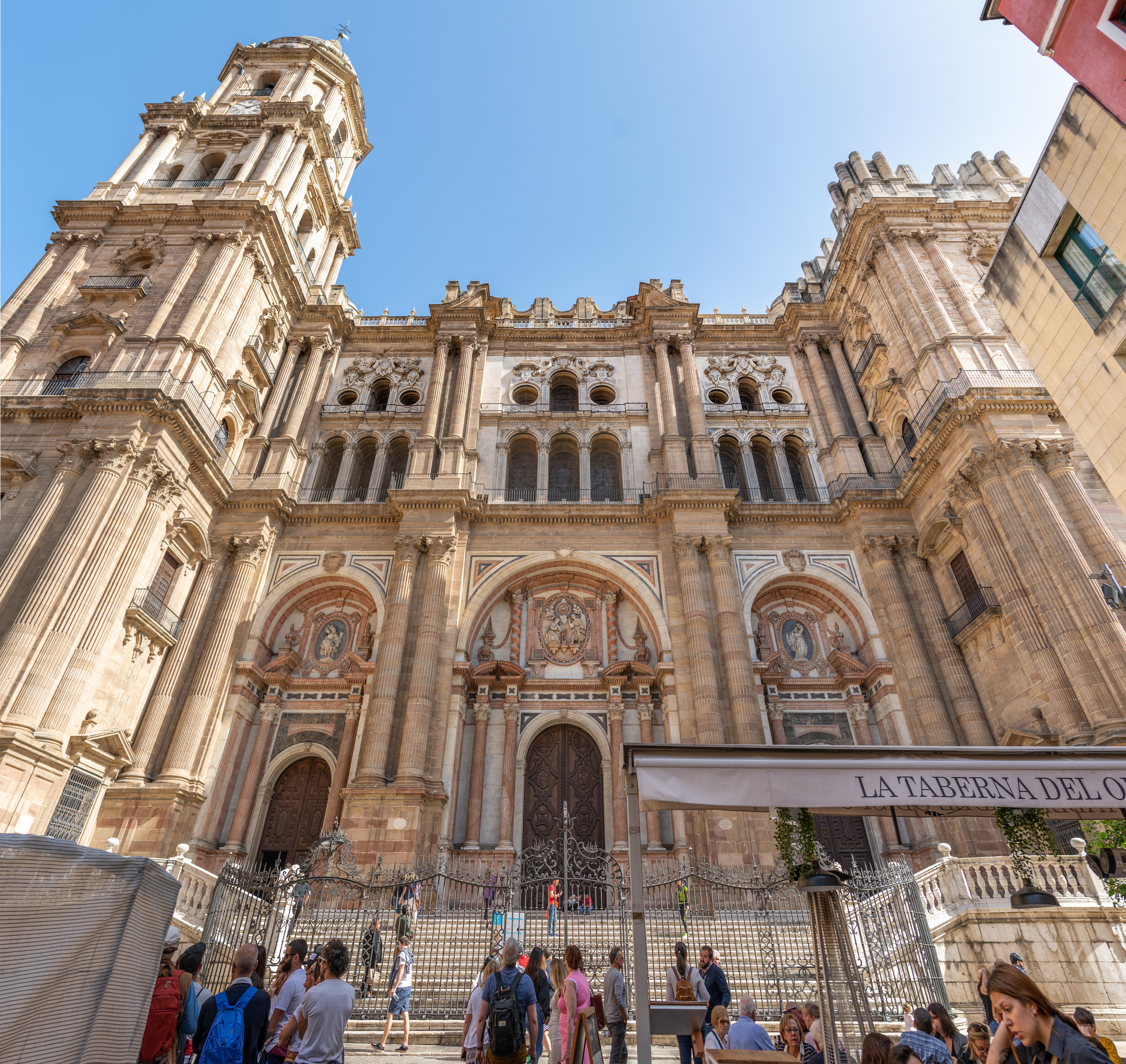
The Cathedral of the Incarnation

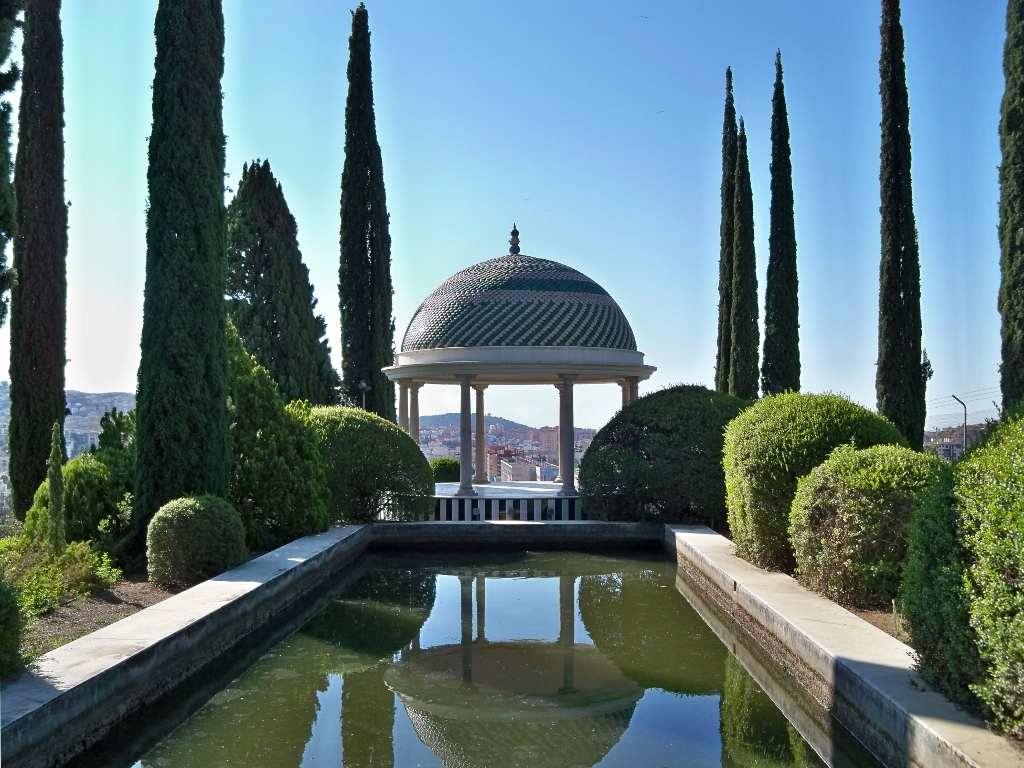
The Concepción viewpoint

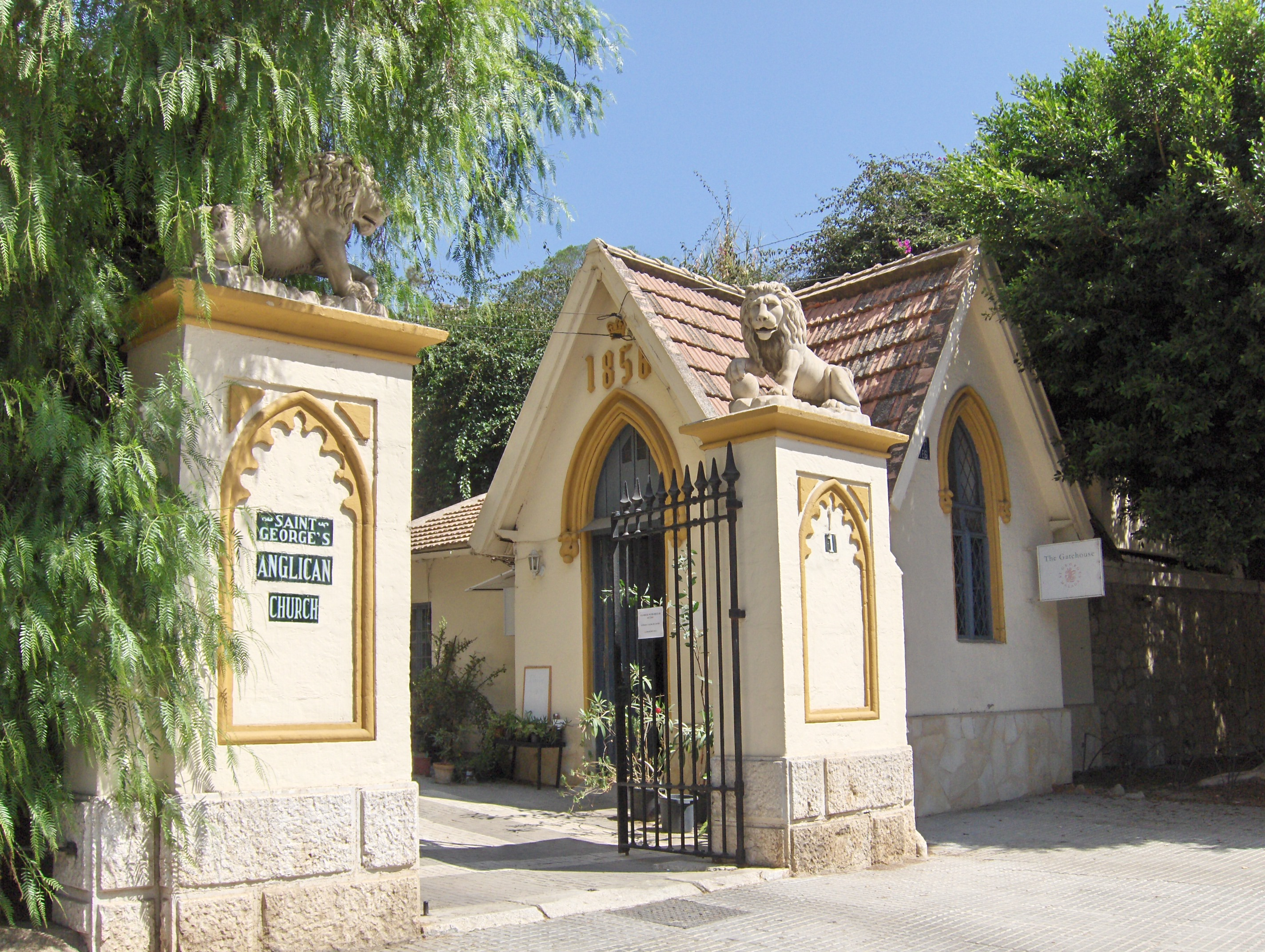
The historic Anglican Cemetery of St. George is the oldest non-Roman Catholic Christian cemetery established on mainland Spain (in 1831).

The old historic centre of Málaga reaches the harbour to the south. In the north it is surrounded by mountains, the Montes de Málaga (part of the Baetic Cordillera) lying in the southern base of the Axarquía hills, and two rivers, the Guadalmedina – the historic center is located on its left bank – and the Guadalhorce, which flows west of the city into the Mediterranean, in the Churriana district.

The oldest architectural remains in the city are the walls of the Phoenician city, which are visible in the cellar of the Museo Picasso Málaga.

The Roman theatre of Málaga, which dates from the 1st century BC, was rediscovered in 1951.

The Moors left posterity the dominating presence of the Castle of Gibralfaro, which is connected to the Alcazaba, the lower fortress and royal residence. Both were built during the Taifa period (11th century) and extended during the Nasrid period (13th and 14th centuries). The Alcazaba stands on a hill within the city. Originally, it defended the city from the incursions of pirates. Later, in the 11th century, it was completely rebuilt by the Hammudid dynasty. Occupying the eastern hillside that rises from the sea and overlooks the city, the Alcazaba was surrounded by palms and pine trees.

Like many of the military fortifications that were constructed in Islamic Spain, the Alcazaba of Málaga featured a quadrangular plan. It was protected by an outer and inner wall, both supported by rectangular towers, between which a covered walkway led up the slope to the Gibralfaro (this was the only exchange between the two sites). Due to its rough and awkward hillside topography, corridors throughout the site provided a means of communications for administrative and defensive operations, also affording privacy to the palatial residential quarters.

The entrance of the complex featured a grand tower that led into a sophisticated double bent entrance. After passing through several gates, open yards with gardens of pine and eucalyptus trees, and the inner wall through the Puerta de Granada, one finds the 11th- and 14th-century Governor's palace. It was organised around a central rectangular courtyard with a triple-arched gateway and some of the rooms have been preserved to this day. An open 11th-century mirador (belvedere) to the south of this area affords views of the gardens and sea below. Measuring 2.5 square metres (27 square feet), this small structure highlighted scalloped, five-lobed arches. To the north of this area were a waterwheel and a Cyclopean well (penetrating forty metres or 130 feet below ground), a hammam, workshops and the monumental Puerta de la Torre del Homenaje, the northernmost point of the inner walls. Directly beyond was the passage to the Gibralfaro above.

The Church of Santiago (Saint James) is an example of Gothic vernacular Mudéjar, the hybrid style that evolved after the Reconquista incorporating elements from both Christian and Islamic tradition. Also from the period is the Iglesia del Sagrario, which was built on the site of the old mosque immediately after the city fell to Christian troops. It boasts a richly ornamented portal in the Isabeline-Gothic style, unique in the city.

The Cathedral and the Episcopal Palace were planned with Renaissance architectural ideals but there was a shortfall of building funds and they were finished in Baroque style.

The Basílica y Real Santuario de Santa María de la Victoria, built in the late 17th century, has a chapel in which the vertical volume is filled with elaborate Baroque plasterwork.

Other sights include:

- Walls. Phoenician, Roman, Byzantine, Arab and Spanish remains of the defensive compounds of the city.
- Church of the Sacred Heart.
- San Felipe Neri Church.
- Church of the Holy Martyrs.
- La Concepción, botanical and historical garden.
- Atarazanas Market.
- Anglican Cemetery of St. George.
- Palm grove and Muelle Uno. Port of Málaga.
- San Miguel Cemetery.
- La Malagueta bullring.
- Pedregalejo, old fishing district.
- Calle Marques de Larios, the main shopping street of the city.

== Culture ==
=== Feasts and festivals ===
Holy Week

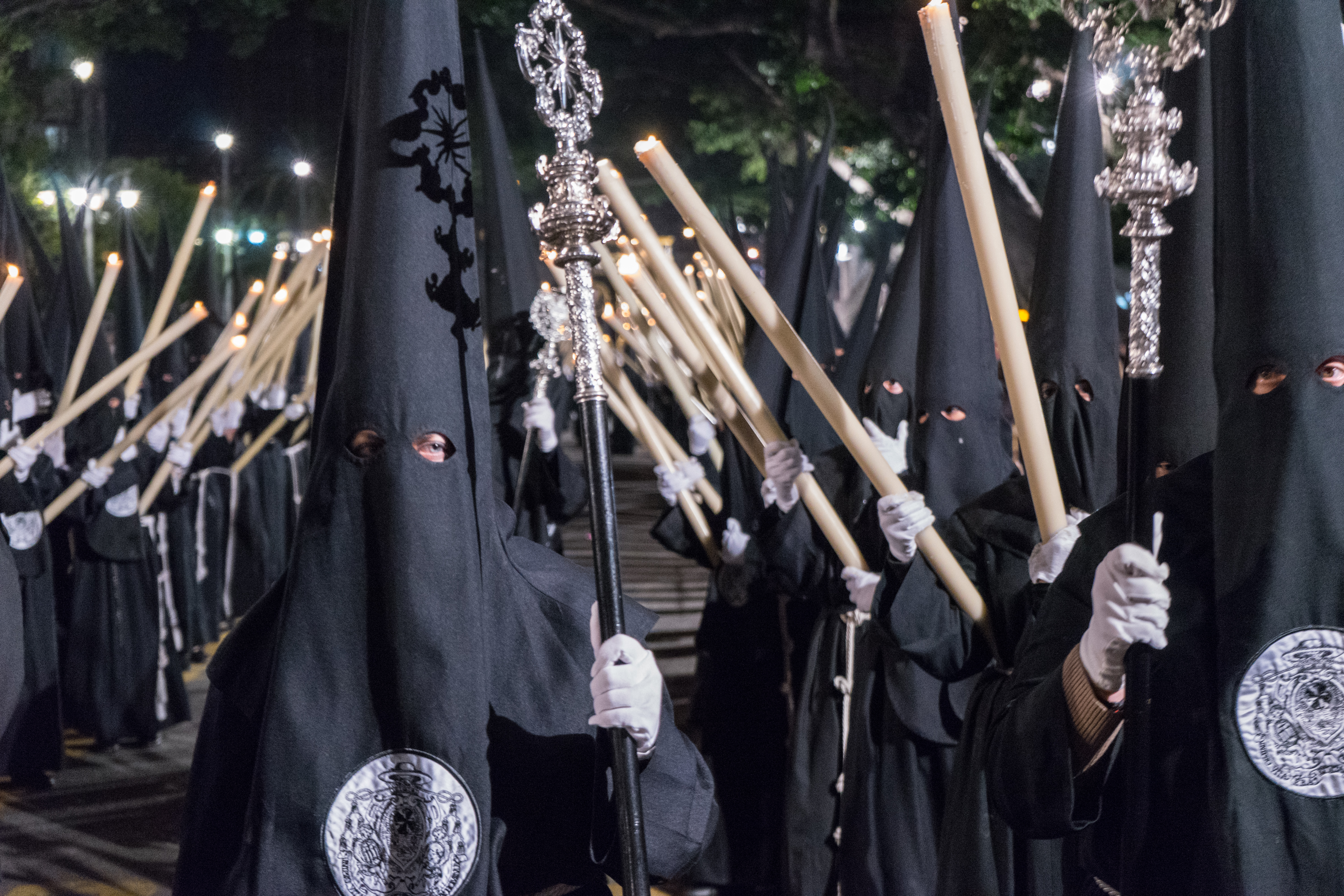
Nazarenos during the 2016 Holy week in Málaga.

Holy Week has been observed for five centuries in Málaga. Processions start on Palm Sunday and continue until Easter Sunday. Images depicting scenes from the Passion are displayed on huge ornate tronos (floats or thrones), some weighing more than 5,000 kilograms (11,000 pounds). Famous is the royal archbrotherhood of Our-Lady of Hope Nuestra Señora de la Esperanza. They have more than 5,000 members and 600 nazarenos. These tronos highlight the processions that go through the streets led by penitents dressed in long robes, with capirote, followed by women in black carrying candles. Drums and trumpets play music and occasionally someone spontaneously sings a mournful saeta dedicated to the floats as they make their way slowly round the streets. Some Holy Week tronos are so huge that they must be housed in places outside the churches, as they are taller than the entrance doors. Famous is the military procession of "la legion" (Royal congregation of Mena) playing marches and singing their anthem (El Novio de la Muerte) during procession.

Feria de Agosto

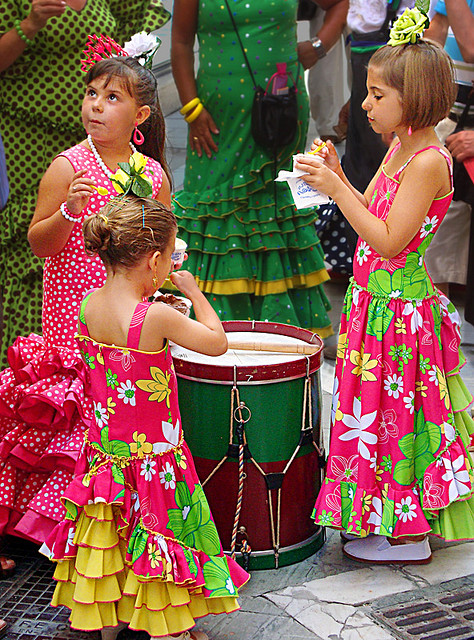
Children during the Feria de Agosto.

During the celebration of the Feria de Málaga in August, the streets are transformed into traditional symbols of Spanish culture and history, with sweet wine, tapas, and live flamenco shows. The day events consist of dancing, live music (such as flamenco or verdiales, traditional music from Málaga) and bullfights at La Malagueta, while the night fair is moved to the Recinto Ferial, consisting of restaurants, clubs, and an entire fair ground with rides and games.

Málaga Film Festival

The Málaga Film Festival (Festival de Málaga Cine Español; FMCE), dedicated exclusively to films produced in Spain, is one of the most important film festivals in the country. It is held annually during a week in March or April.

Other

The Fiesta Mayor de Verdiales takes place every year on 28 December during which Spain's April Fools' Day is celebrated.

The Fiestas de Carnaval, in which people dress in all types of costumes, takes place prior to the holy 40 days of Lent every February. A contest is held in the Teatro Cervantes between groups of singers, quartets and choirs who compete in the singing of ironic songs about social and political issues. The Carnival takes to the streets of Málaga on the week before Ash Wednesday, ending on Malagueta beach with the burial of the anchovy (entierro de la sardina).

=== Gastronomy ===
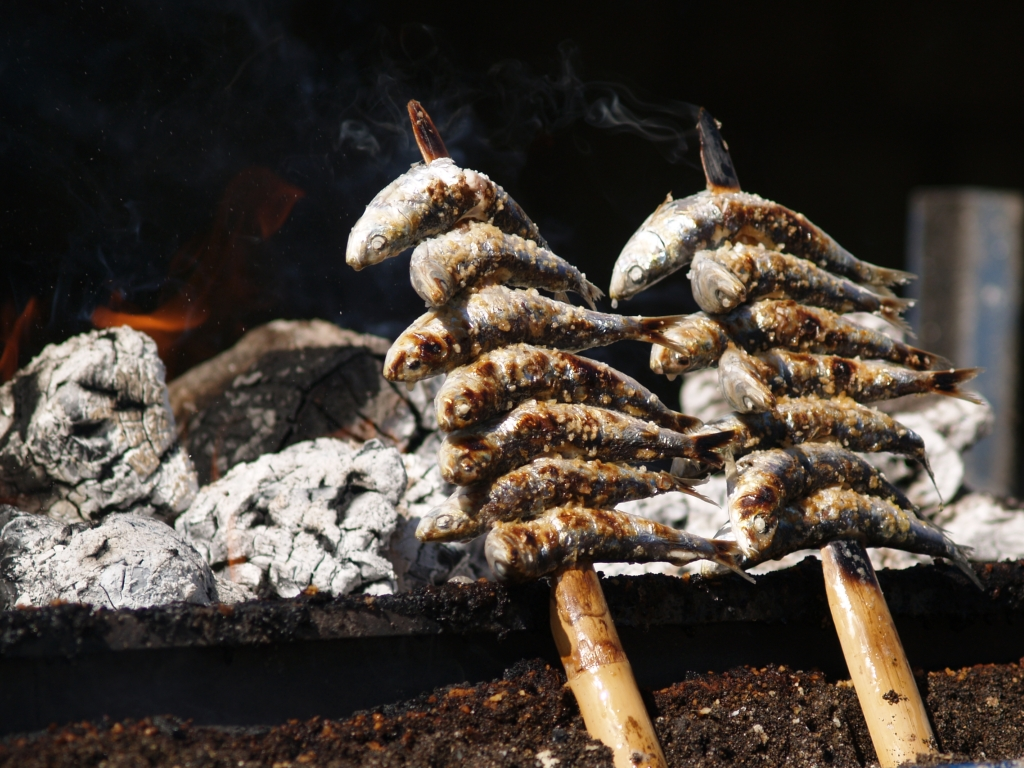
Espetos

The cuisine of Málaga and the wider Costa del Sol is known for its espetos, fish (most often sardines) grilled over open fires in the chiringuitos located near the beaches. The espeto has been proposed as a candidate for designation by UNESCO as an intangible cultural heritage.

=== Religion ===
Most of the population of Málaga professes Roman Catholicism as its religion, although not many are practising Catholics. Protestants also have a presence in Málaga: one of seven congregations of the Reformed Churches in Spain is based in the city and is the only one that permits paedocommunion.

Islam is represented by a growing number of immigrants and a mosque, while the Jewish community (primarily Sephardi) is represented by its synagogue and the Jewish Association.

=== Sports ===
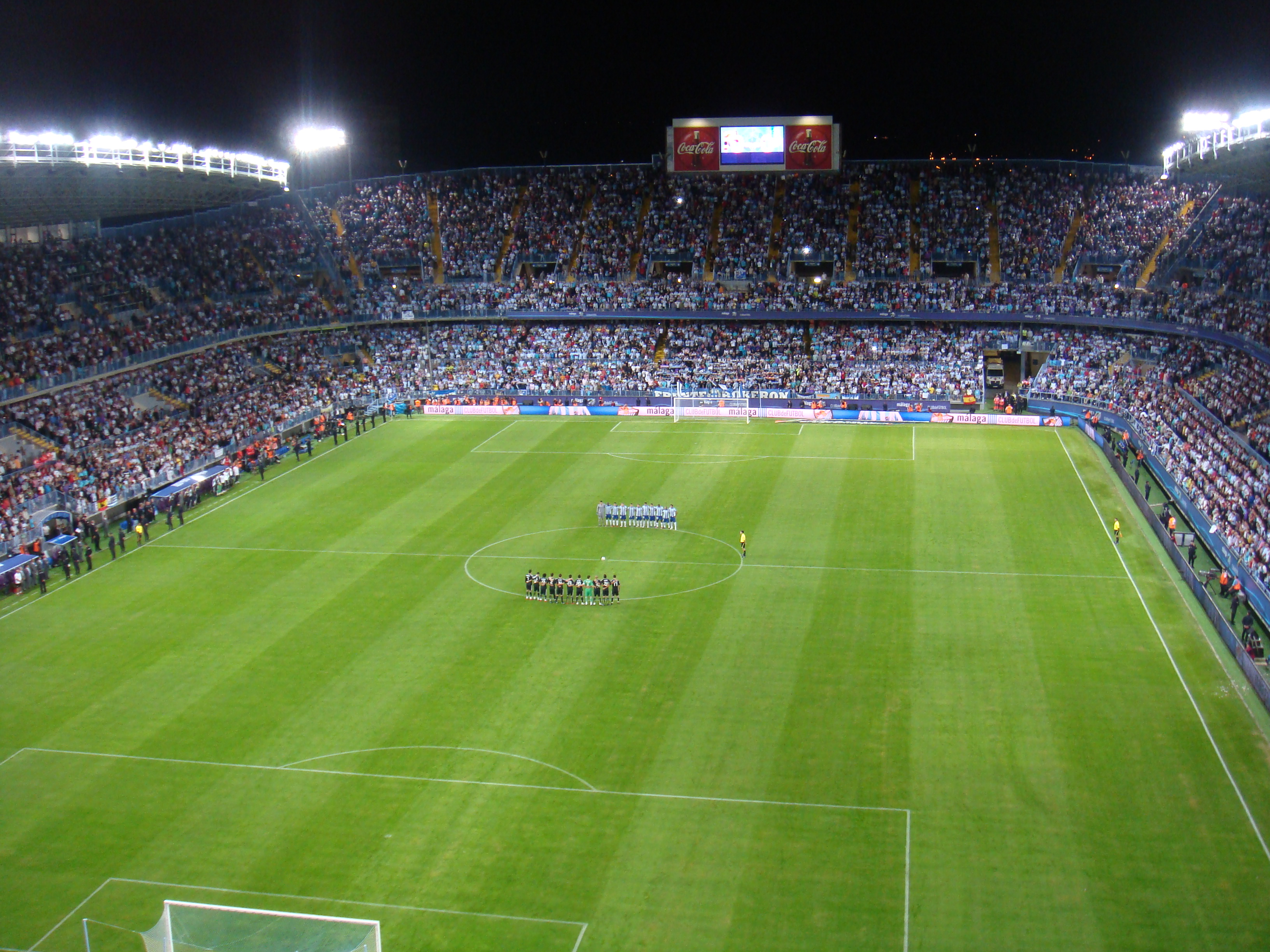
A Málaga CF vs. Real Madrid C.F. fixture in October 2010 at La Rosaleda

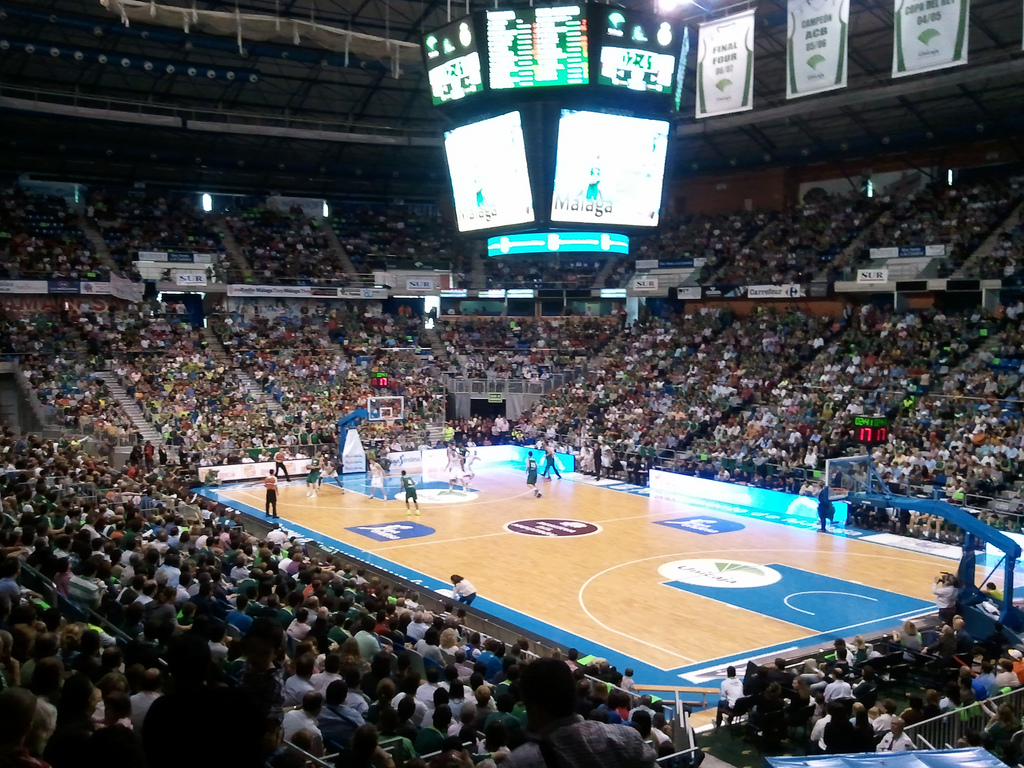
A Unicaja Málaga vs. Real Madrid fixture in November 2011 at the Martín Carpena

Málaga is home to three major professional sports teams. These include:

- Málaga CF – football club plays in Segunda División. Honours: UEFA Intertoto Cup: 2002, UEFA Cup: 2003 (quarter-finals), UEFA Champions League: 2013 (quarter-finals).
- CB Málaga – basketball club plays in ACB League. Honours: Spanish Championship: 2006, runner-up: 1995, 2002; Spanish Cup: 2005, 2023, 2025, runner-up: 2009, 2020; Spanish Super-Cup: 2024, runner-up: 2006, 2015, 2023; Korać Cup: 2001, runner-up: 2000; Euroleague: third place: 2007; EuroCup: 2017
- CD El Palo – football club plays in third level of Spanish football: Segunda Division B
- Club Atlético Málaga – women's football club plays in Superliga Femenina, Honours: Spain Cup: 1998, runner-up: 1997; Spain Supercup: 1999

The city has four large sports facilities:

- La Rosaleda Stadium – football stadium, with a capacity of 30,044. One of the arenas of Segunda División (for Málaga CF) and 1982 FIFA World Cup. Final of UEFA Intertoto Cup 2002.
- Palacio de Deportes José María Martín Carpena – sports arena, with a maximum capacity of 14,000. It is home of CB Málaga and arena of Spanish Cup 2001, 2007, 2014; Spanish Super-Cup 2004, 2006, 2015; NBA Europe Live Tour 2007;
- Estadio Ciudad de Málaga – athletics stadium with a capacity of 7,500. Place where the European Cup 2006 was celebrated; 2006 Vuelta a España; Spain Athletics Championships 2005 and 2011;
- Centro Acuático de Málaga (Málaga Aquatic Centre) – water arena, with a capacity of 17,000. Arena of European Water Polo Championship 2008.

In the city, people can engage in many sports, for example: surfing, windsurfing, kitesurfing, swimming, diving, skydiving, paragliding, running, cycling, rowing, tennis and golf.

The city hosted the 21st World Transplant Games from 25 June to 2 July 2017.

Málaga is the 2020 EU Sports Capital.

=== Museums ===
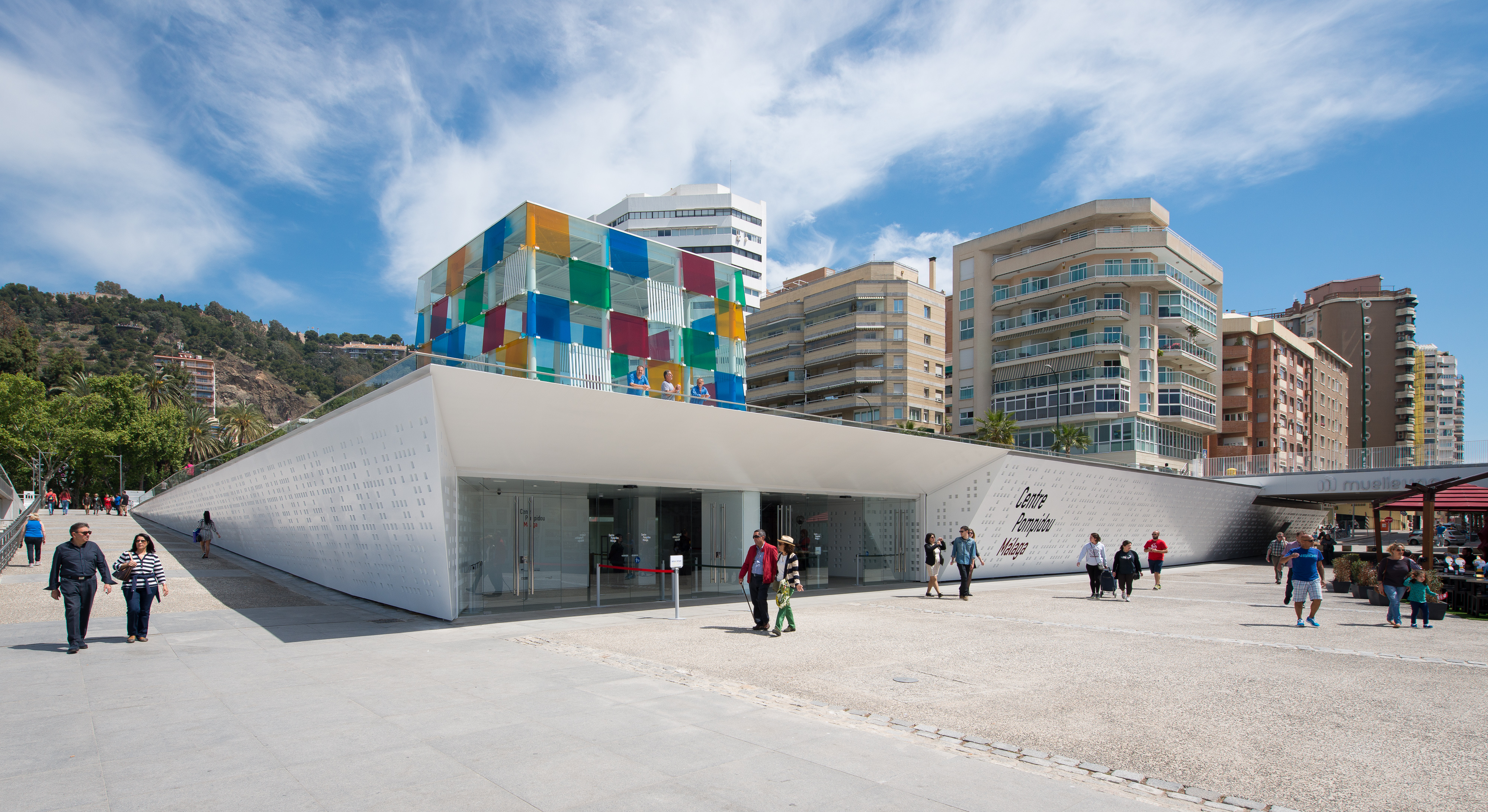
Málaga's Centre Pompidou

In the early part of the 21st century, the city of Málaga invested heavily (more than 100 million euros in 10 years) in the arts to draw tourists and establish itself as a cultural Andalucia destination with 28 museums. Some notable and recently opened museums include the Museo Municipal de Málaga, the Museo de Málaga (Fine Arts and Archeology museum) at the Palacio de la Aduana, Carmen Thyssen Museum, opened in 2011, located at Palacio de Villalón, the Museo Picasso Málaga (opened in 2003, at the Palacio de los Condes de Buenavista) near the cathedral, (Note: From 2015 to 2017 it was the most visited museum in all Málaga.) the Centre Pompidou Málaga (opened in 2015, located in El Cubo), the Fundación Picasso and Picasso Birthplace Museum, the Colección del Museo Ruso (Collection of the Russian Museum) Saint Petersburg/Málaga, (opened in 2015, located in the Tabacalera building), the Museum Jorge Rando (opened in 2015), the Museo de Artes y Costumbres Populares (Museum of Arts and Popular Traditions), and the Centro de Arte Contemporáneo de Málaga (CAC Málaga; opened 2003 and closed for renovation, without a planned reopening date, on 8 September 2024, located near the Alameda train station).

== Economy ==
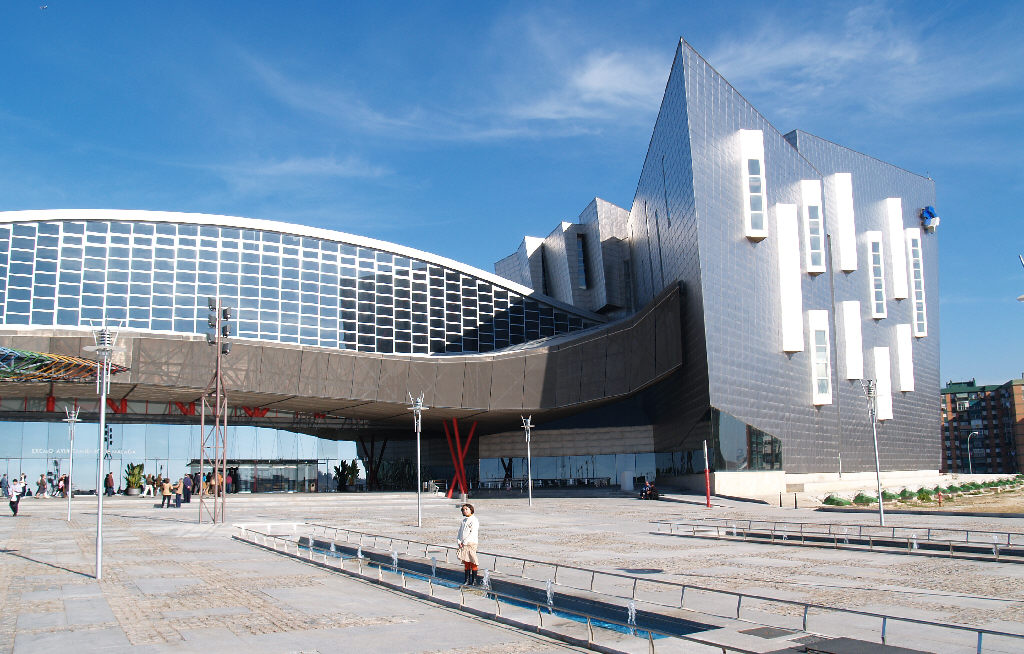
Trade Fair and Congress in Málaga (Palacio de Ferias y Congresos de Málaga)

Málaga is the fourth-ranking city in economic activity in Spain behind Madrid, Barcelona and Valencia.

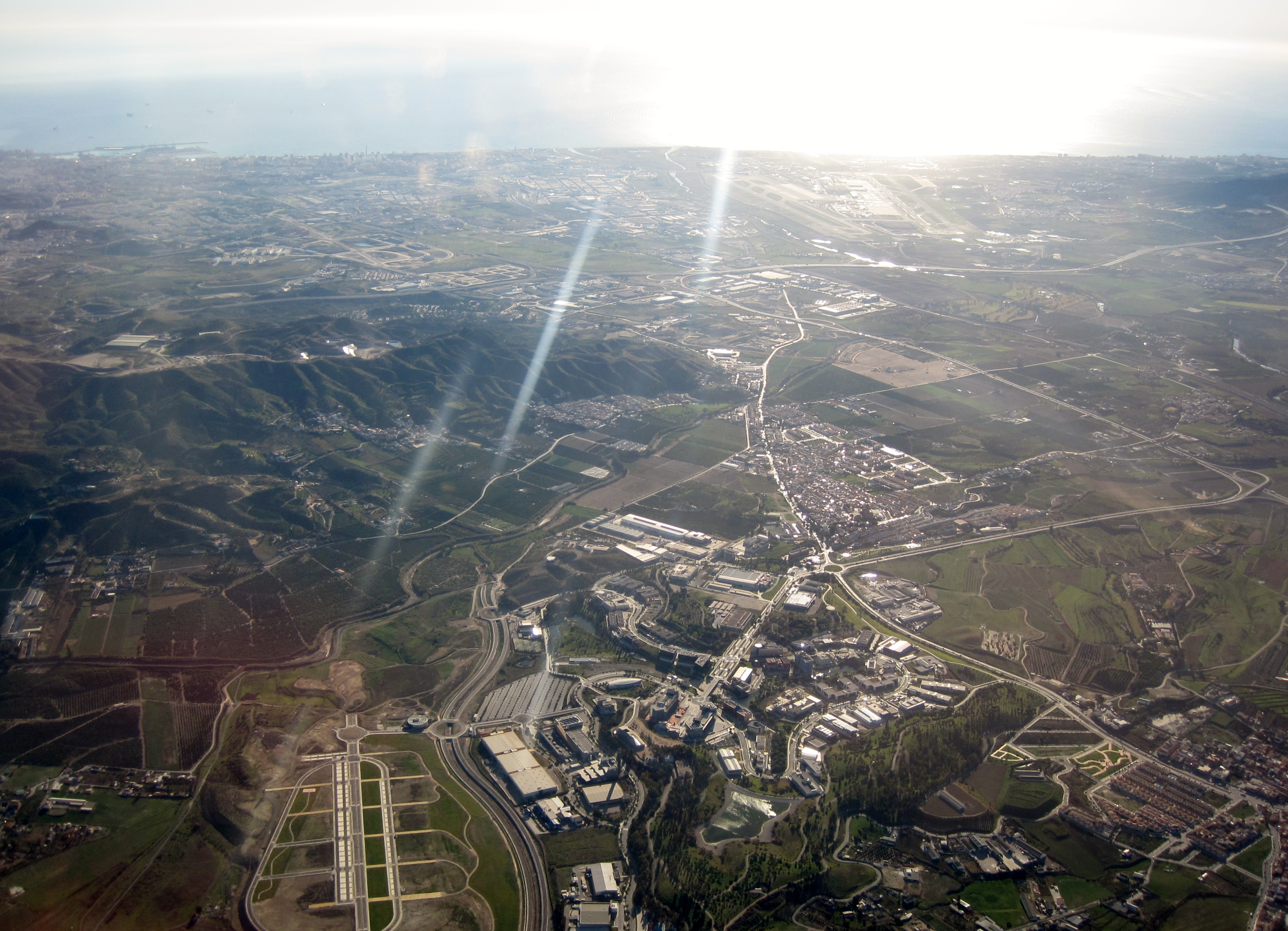
Aerial view of the Andalusia Technology Park.

The most important business sectors in Málaga are tourism, construction and technology services, but other sectors such as transportation and logistics are beginning to expand. The Andalusia Technology Park (PTA) (In Spanish, "Parque Tecnológico de Andalucía"), located in Málaga, has enjoyed significant growth since its inauguration in 1992 by the King of Spain. Málaga TechPark closed 2025 with 29,018 employees, an increase of 3.89% from the previous year, while companies and institutions based in the park recorded combined revenue of €4.896 billion.

In line with the city's strategic plan, the campaign "Málaga: Open for Business" is directed towards the international promotion of the city on all levels but fundamentally on a business level. The campaign places a special emphasis on new technologies as well as innovation and research in order to promote the city as a reference and focal point for many global business initiatives and projects.

Málaga is a city of commerce and tourism has been a growing source of revenue, driven by the presence of a major airport, the improvement of communications, and new infrastructure such as the AVE and the maritime station, and new cultural facilities such as the Picasso Museum, the Contemporary Art Centre and Trade Fair and Congress, which have drawn more tourists.

The city hosts the International Association of Science and Technology Parks (IASP) (Asociación Internacional de Parques Tecnológicos), and a group of IT company executives and business leaders has launched an information sector initiative, Málaga Valley e-27, which seeks to make Málaga the Silicon Valley of Europe. Málaga has had strong growth in new technology industries, mainly located in the Technological Park of Andalusia, and in the construction sector. The city is home to the largest bank in Andalusia, Unicaja, and such local companies as Mayoral, Charanga, Sando, Vera, Ubago, Isofoton, Tedial, Novasoft, Grupo Vértice and Almeida viajes, and other multinationals such as Fujitsu Spain, Pernod Ricard Spain, Accenture, Epcos, Oracle Corporation, Huawei and San Miguel. In February 2021, Google decided to install a centre of excellence in cybersecurity in the city, slated for a 2023 opening. Also in 2021, Vodafone chose Málaga for the installment of a research, development and innovation centre.

Distribution by sector industrial enterprises:
Industrial sector	Companies
Energy and water	24
Chemical and mining	231
Mechanical engineering industry	833
Manufacturing	1,485
Total	2,573
Industrial activity index	771
Construction-related companies	3,143

== Education ==
=== Bilingual education in schools ===
Since the launch of the 'Plan de Fomento del Plurilingüismo' in 2005, 169 schools in Málaga have included bilingual education in their programmes. Although English is the most usual second language, many other primary and secondary schools in Málaga offer the choice of French, German, Arabic, Portuguese or Chinese. This first action has been followed by a second project run by the Junta de Andalucia. The so-called "Plan Estratégico de Desarrollo de las Lenguas en Andalucía" intends to provide pupils with a basic level (B1) of at least one foreign language.

=== Artistic training ===
Dance, music, theater, visual arts, architecture, and handicrafts also have a place in the public education system of Málaga. Some of the most relevant artistic schools are:

- Escuela de Arte San Telmo: Arts and Crafts, vocational and high-school education.
- Conservatorio Profesional de Musica Manuel Carra: music, vocational training.
- Conservatorio Profesional de Danza de Málaga: dance, vocational training.
- Conservatorio Superior de Música de Málaga: Bachelor and Master level.
- Escuela Superior de Artes Escénicas de Málaga (Bachelor and Master level).
- Colegio de arquitectos Málaga (Bachelor and Master level).

=== Spanish as a foreign language ===
Málaga has become one of the leading destinations for Spanish courses. In 2017, 16,692 students visited Málaga to enroll in Spanish courses, 17.6% more than 2016.

=== Universities in Málaga ===
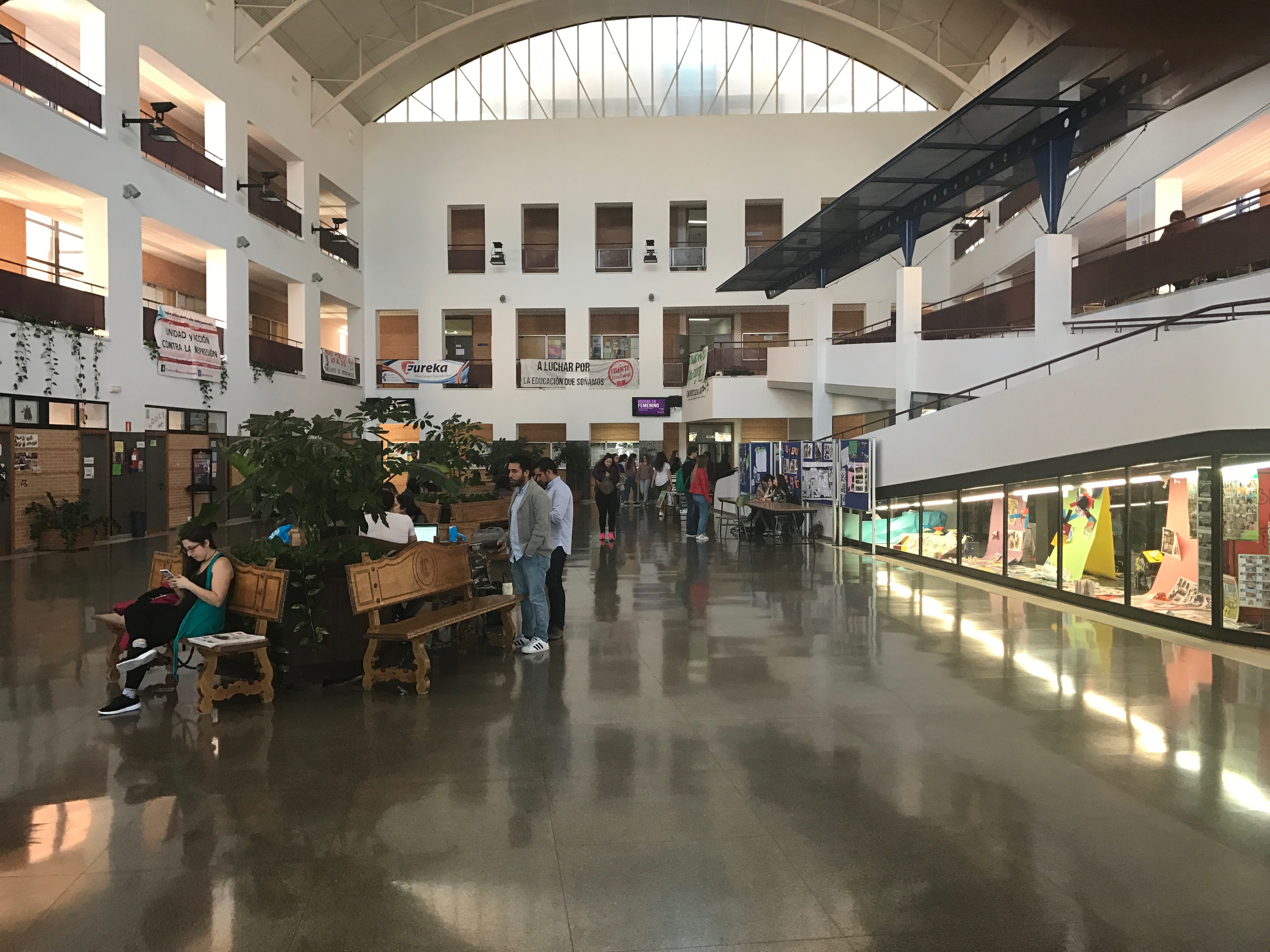
Interior of the Faculty of Education

The public University of Málaga (UMA) was created in 1972. Further, in 1963, a branch of the University of Granada (a Faculty of Economic and Business Sciences) opened.

The campus of the UMA is located in the Western neighbourhood of Teatinos.

=== International schools in Málaga city ===
- British School, Málaga (British school)
- Lycée Français de Málaga (French school)
- Swedish School in Málaga

== Tourism ==
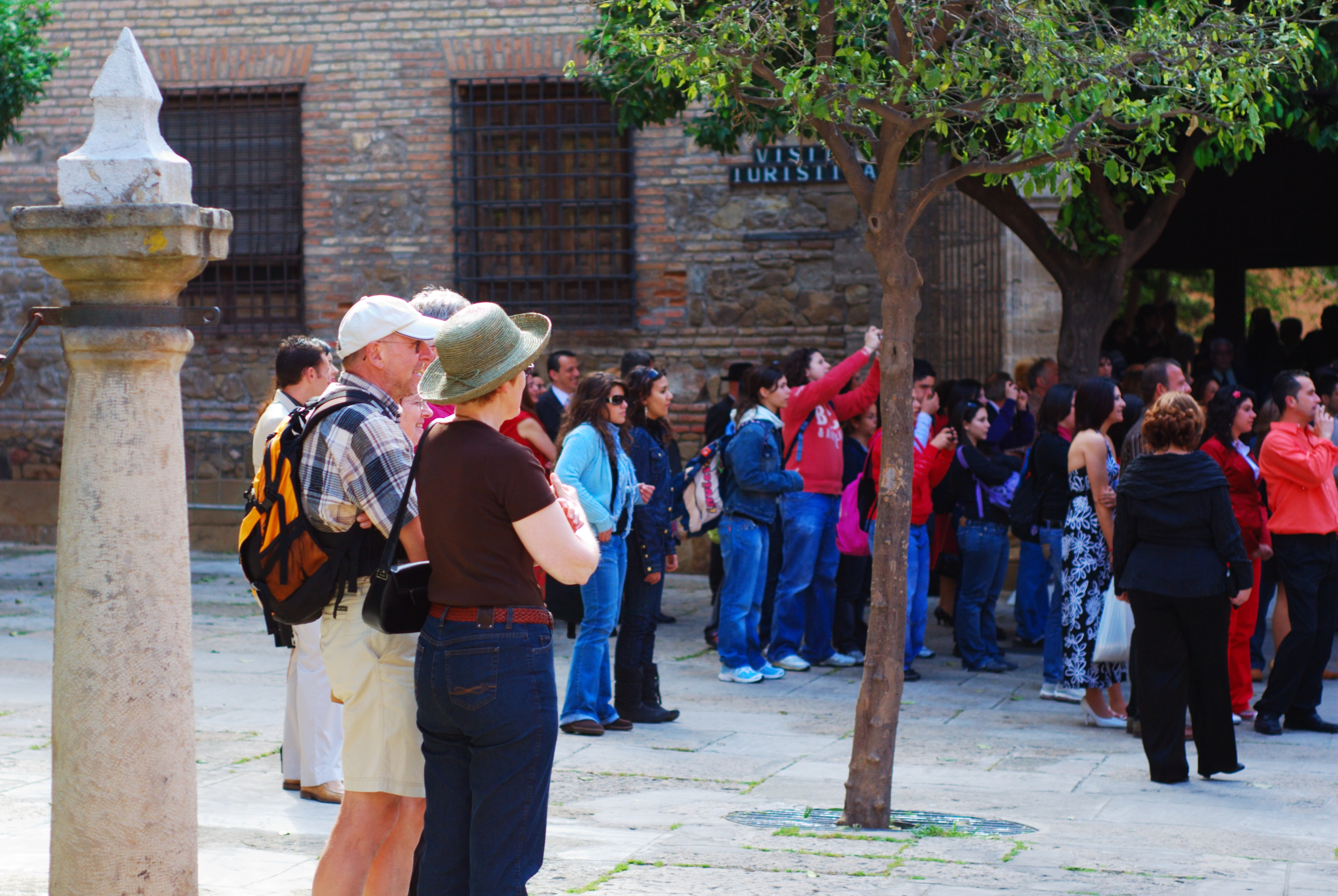
Tourists near the Sagrario Church.

The city is an important tourist destination, known as "the capital of the Costa del Sol". An estimated 6 million tourists visit the city each year. Tourists usually visit the birthplace of Pablo Picasso and the Museo Picasso Málaga, the Carmen Thyssen Museum, the old town or the beaches. The Málaga harbour is also the second busiest cruise port of the Iberian Peninsula.

A popular walk leads up the hill to the Gibralfaro castle (a Parador), offering panoramic views over the city. The castle is next to the Alcazaba, the old Muslim palace, which in turn is next to the inner city of Málaga. Other nearby attractions are the Roman Theatre, the old Jewish quarter (or judería), the cathedral, and the Church of Santiago in mudéjar style. A popular walk follows the Paseo del Parque (a promenade that runs alongside a grand park with many palm trees and statues) to the harbour, ending in Calle Larios, the main commercial street of the city. There is also a curious museum, the Museum of the Holy Week (Museo de Arte Cofrade), which includes an impressive display of Baroque ecclesiastical items.

== Transport ==
=== Airport ===
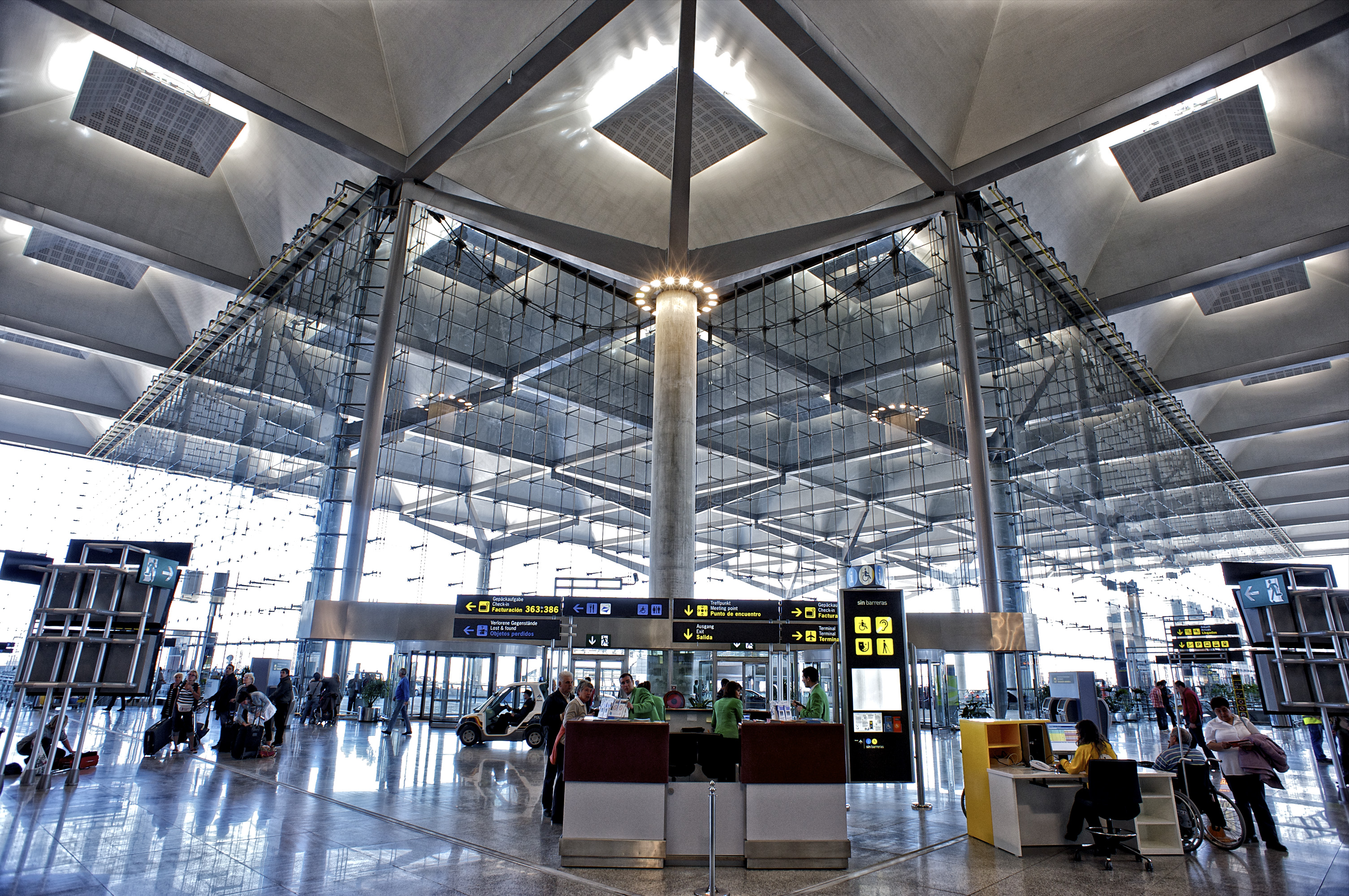
Málaga Airport

The city is served by Málaga–Costa del Sol Airport, located approximately 8 kilometres (5.0 mi) from the city centre. In 2025, the airport handled 26,760,549 passengers and 186,990 aircraft movements, both record annual totals, making it the fourth-busiest airport in Spain by passenger traffic. It is the international airport of Andalusia, accounting for 85 percent of its international traffic. The airport, connected to the Costa del Sol, has a daily link with twenty cities in Spain and over a hundred cities in Europe (mainly in the United Kingdom, Central Europe and the Nordic countries but also the main cities of Eastern Europe: Bucharest, Budapest, Sofia and Warsaw), North Africa, Middle East (Riyadh, Jeddah and Kuwait) and North America (New York City, Toronto and Montreal).

The airport is connected to the city centre and surrounding areas through a transport hub, which includes the bus system and suburban trains and car parks.

=== Seaport ===
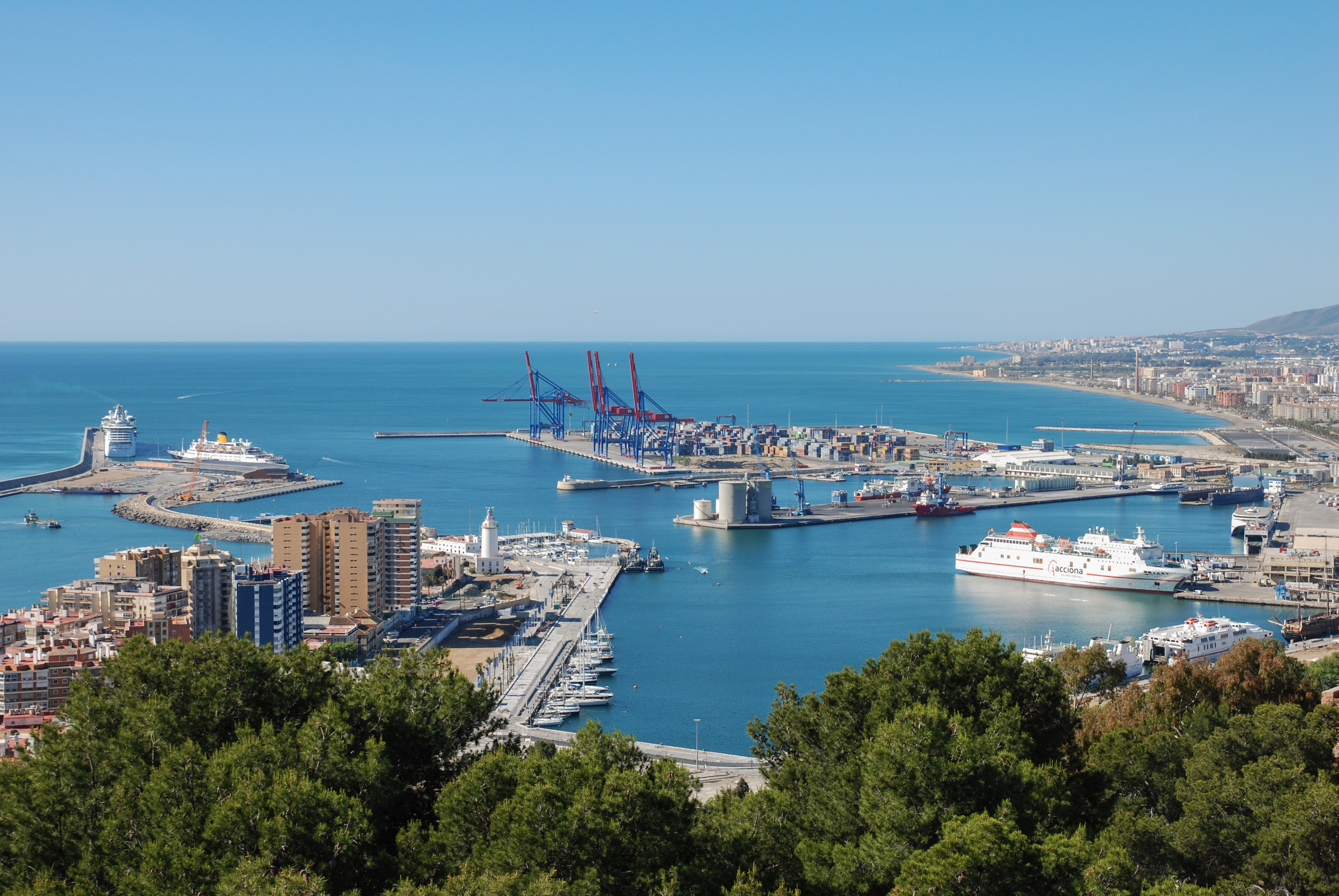
Port of Málaga

The Port of Málaga is the city's seaport, operating continuously at least since 600 BC. In 2025, the Port of Málaga handled 5.6 million tonnes of total traffic, an increase of 24.3% from 2024 and a record for the port. The Málaga–Melilla regular passenger route carried 365,503 passengers, while cruise traffic reached 570,481 passengers on 331 ship calls.

The port has a ferry connection to the Port of Melilla, playing a role in the so-called Operación paso del estrecho ("Operation Pass of the Strait"), the planned seasonal transit of passengers during the summer months from Europe to North-Africa (and back to Europe).

=== High-speed train ===
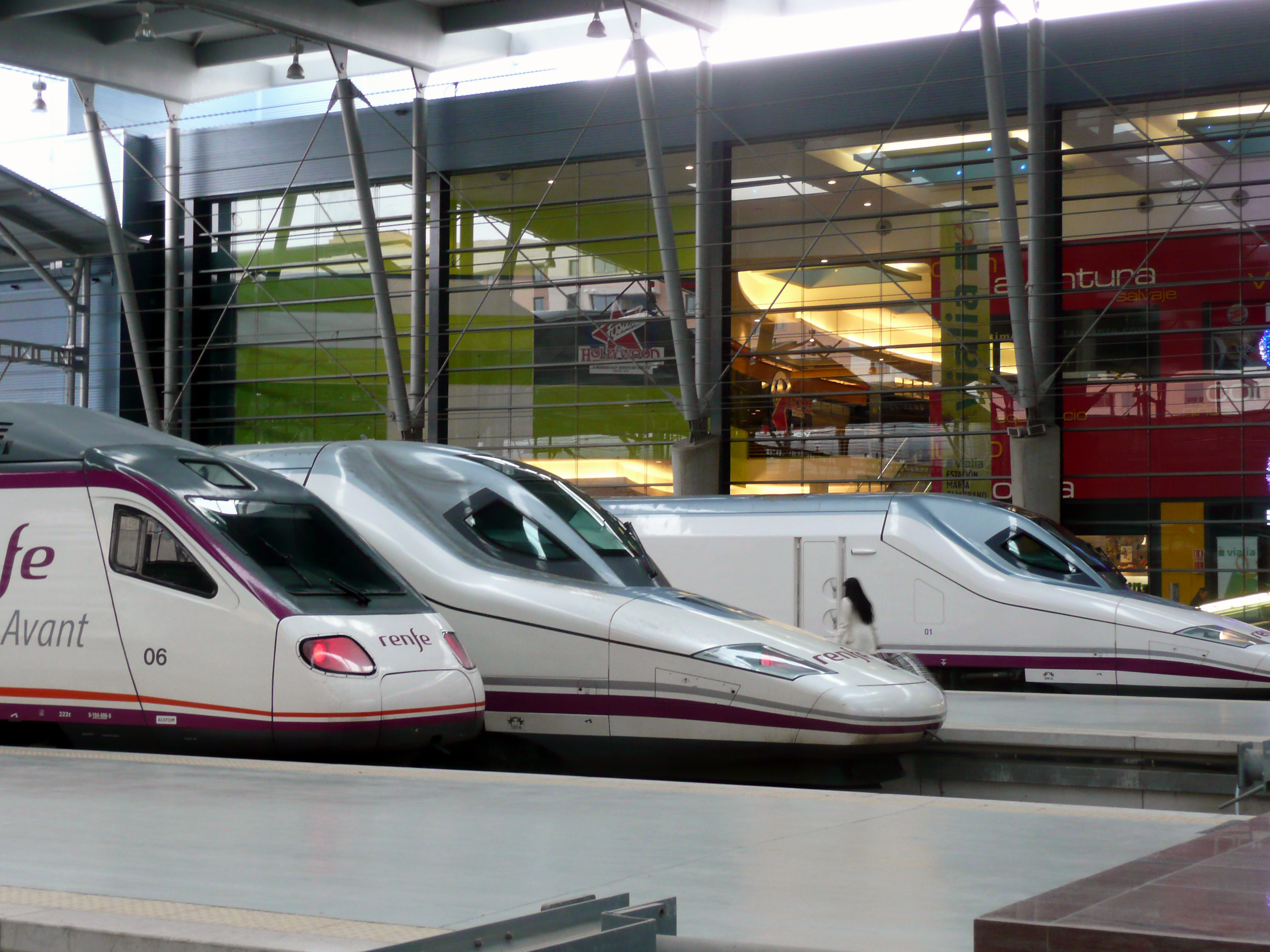
High speed trains AVE S-112 nicknamed "Pato" ("Duck") in Málaga-Maria Zambrano Station.

The Málaga María Zambrano railway station is served by the AVE high-speed rail system, and is operated by the state-owned rail company Renfe and the private company Iryo.

=== Roads and highways ===
The A45 road leads north to Antequera and Córdoba. The Autovía A-7 parallels the N-340 road, both leading to Cádiz to the west through the Costa del Sol Occidental and Barcelona to the east through the Costa del Sol Oriental.

=== Public transportation ===
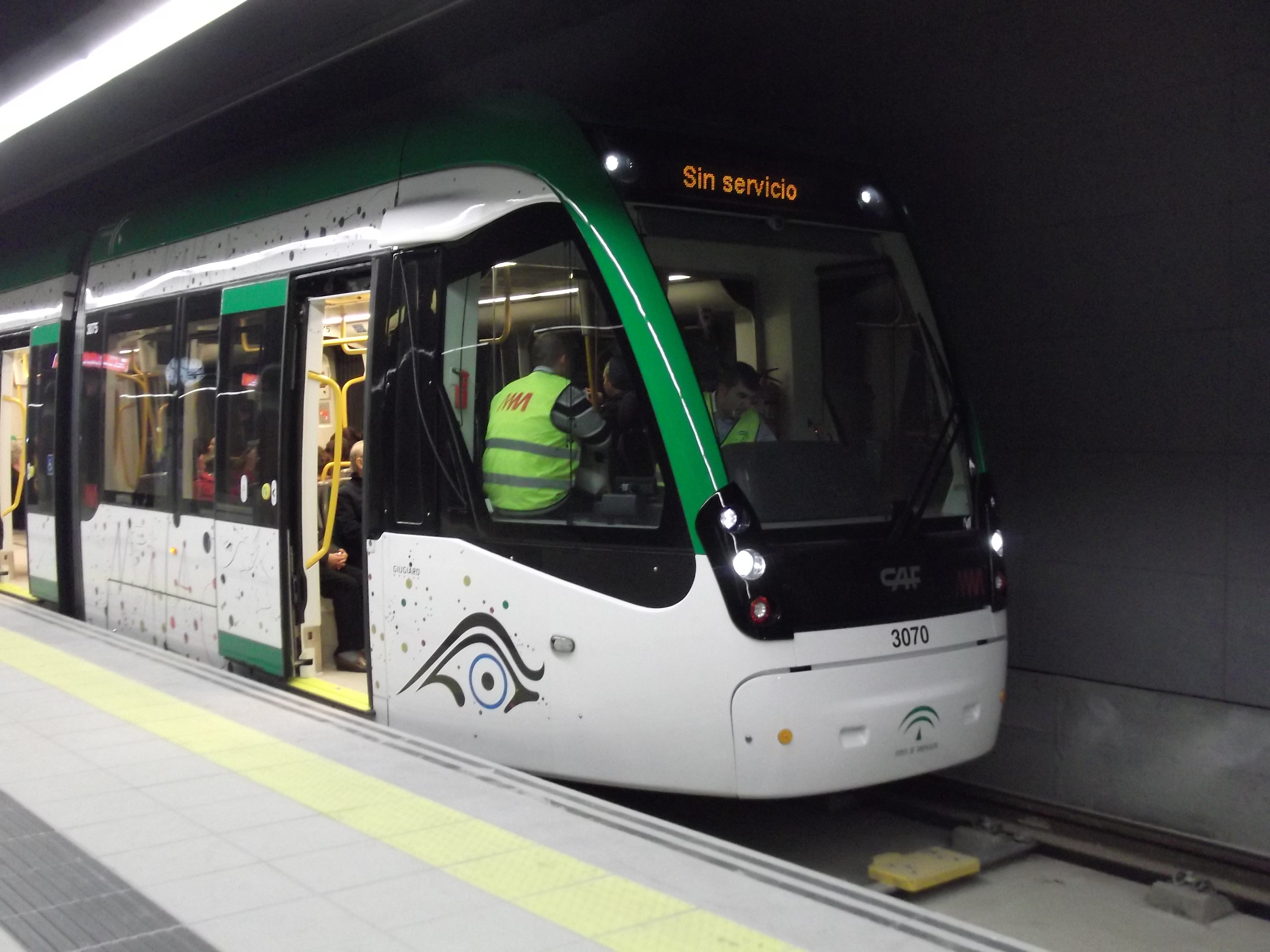
Málaga Metro

Urban bus

Empresa Malagueña de Transportes buses are the main form of transport around the city. Málaga's bus station is connected with the city by the bus line number 4, although it is only ten minutes' walk to the Alameda from there. In 2025, EMT buses carried 53,058,202 passengers, the highest annual total in the operator's history and a 4.83% increase from 2024.

Metropolitan bus

The buses of the Málaga Metropolitan Transport Consortium (Consorcio de Transporte Metropolitano del Área de Málaga) are the main means of transportation around the city of Málaga and the surrounding municipalities.

Mass transit

The city has two commuter train lines Cercanías departing from the Centro-Alameda station and the Málaga Metro, a light rail system. The city is served by two Cercanías Málaga commuter rail lines and the Málaga Metro, whose two lines extend 13.6 kilometres (8.5 mi) and serve 19 stations and stops. The Metro carried 19,222,912 passengers in 2025, a 5.3% increase from 2024. The Cercanías Málaga network carried 15,542,731 passengers in 2025.

== Notable people ==
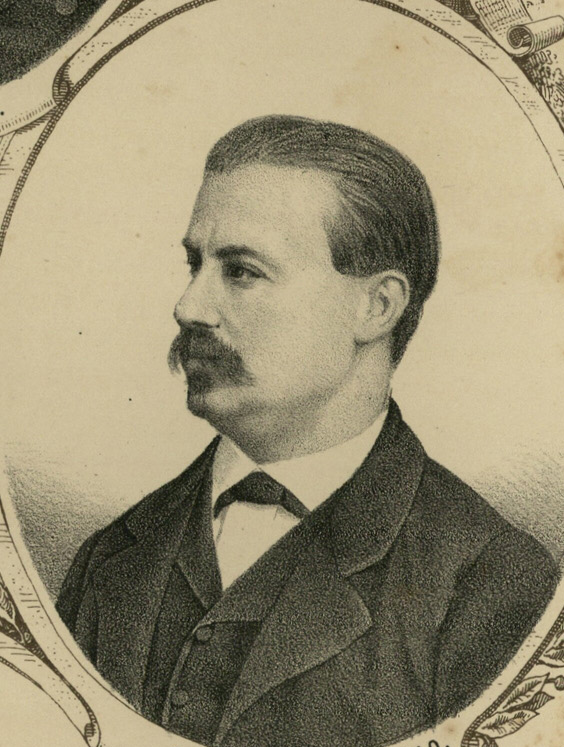
Antonio Cánovas del Castillo, 1869

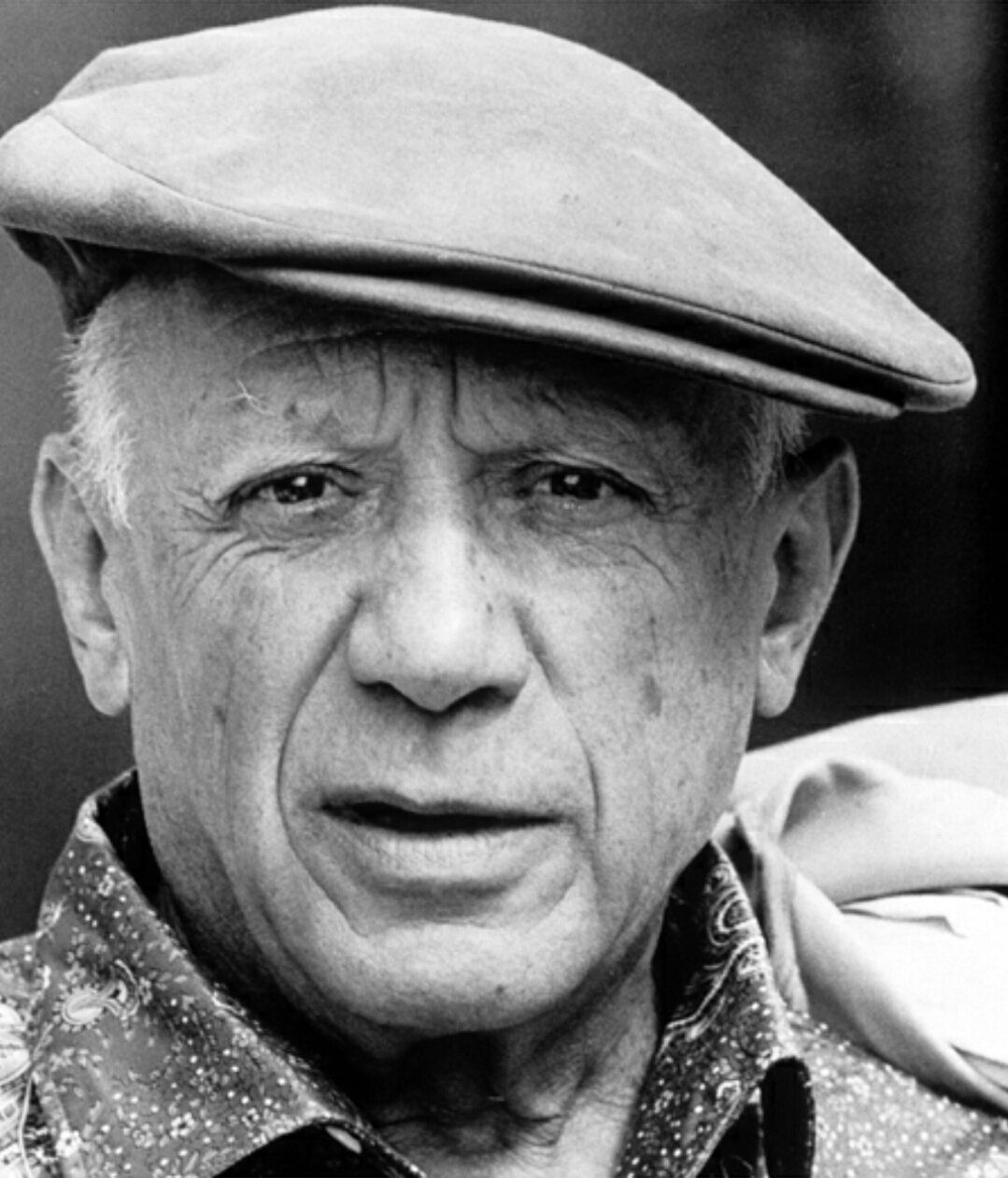
Pablo Picasso, 1962

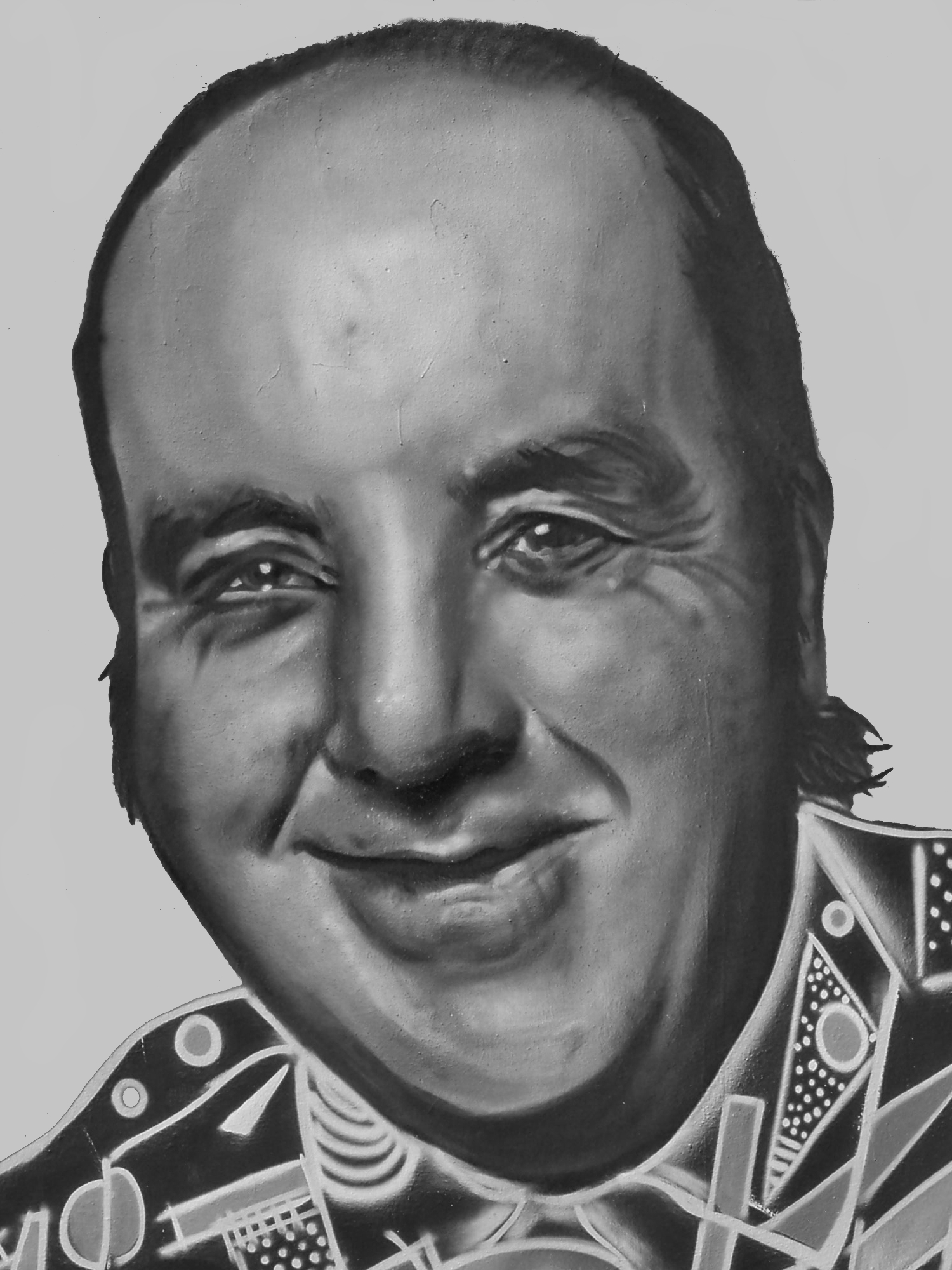
Chiquito de la Calzada, 2020

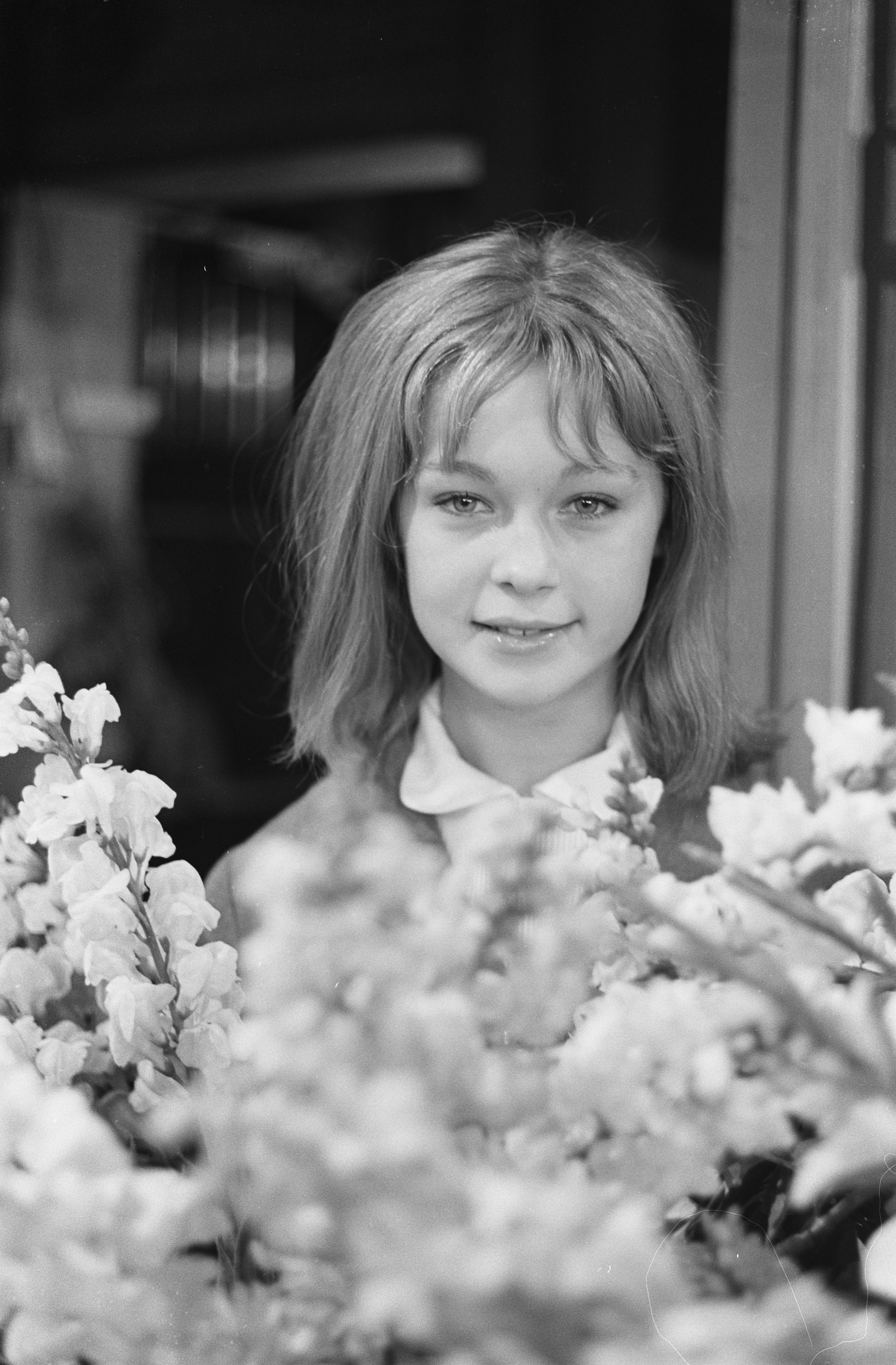
Marisol or Pepa Flores, 1962

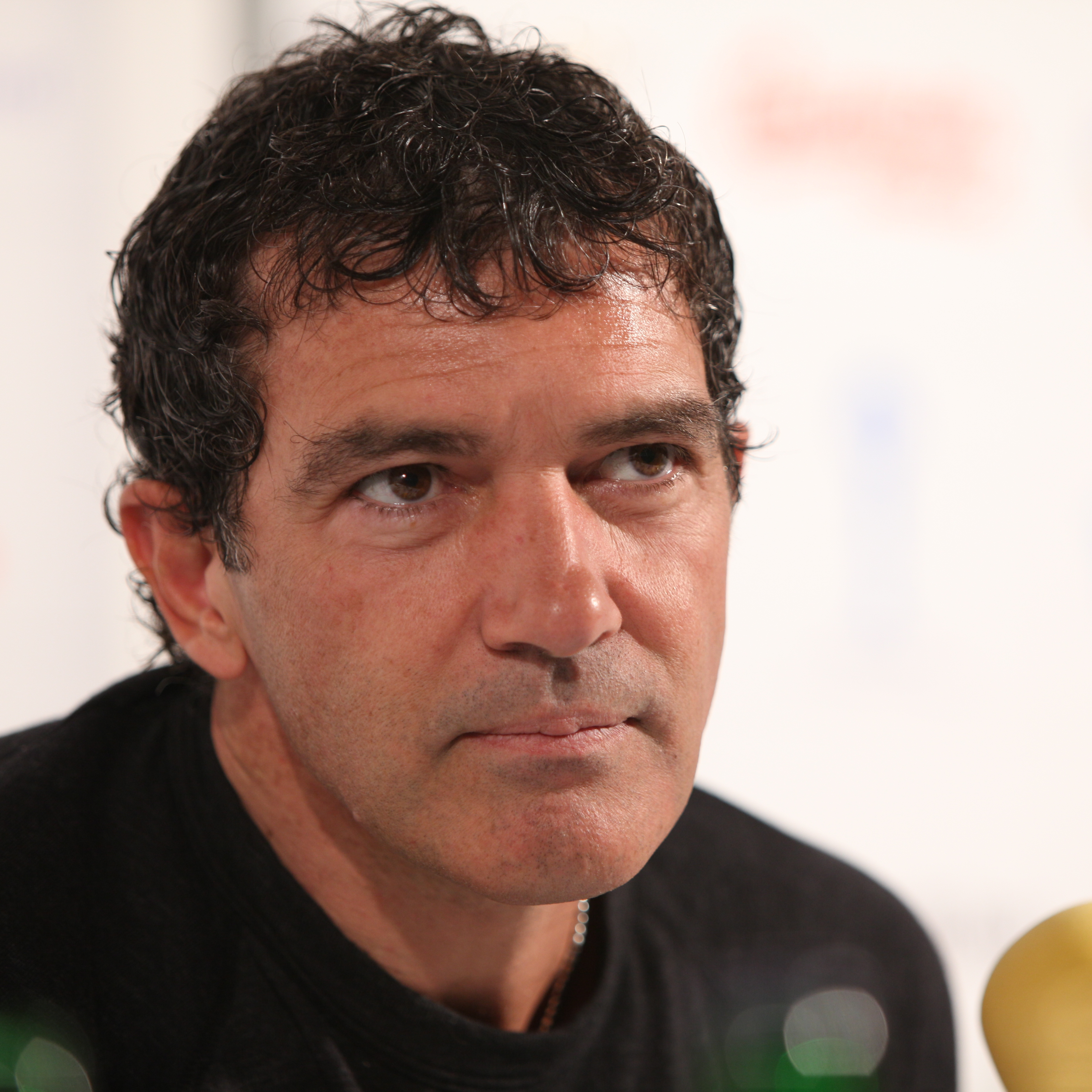
Antonio Banderas, 2009

- Solomon ibn Gabirol (1021–1058), Jewish philosopher and poet
- Ibn al-Baytar (1188–1248), botanist and pharmacist
- Ruy López de Villalobos (1500–1544), explorer
- Diego de Montemayor (1530–1611), founder of Monterrey, Mexico and governor of Nuevo León
- Francisco de Leiva (1630–1676), playwright
- Luis de Unzaga (1721–1790), politician
- Bernardo de Gálvez (1746–1786), Count of Gálvez and Viscount of Galveston, military and colonial administrator
- María Manuela Kirkpatrick de Grevignée (1794–1879), aristocrat
- José de Salamanca (1811–1883), Marquis of Salamanca and Count of Los Llanos, businessman and politician
- Antonio Cánovas del Castillo (1828–1897), Prime Minister of Alfonso XII
- Manuel de la Cámara y Livermoore (1836–1920), Spanish Navy admiral
- José Denis Belgrano (1844–1917), painter
- José Moreno Carbonero (1858–1942), painter
- Pablo Picasso (1881–1973), artist, born in Málaga
- José Moreno Villa (1887–1955), painter and writer
- Bernardo Giner de los Ríos (1888–1970), architect and politician
- Victoria Kent (1898–1987), lawyer and politician
- Luis Bolín (1894–1969), lawyer and journalist
- Emilio Prados (1899–1962), poet
- Manuel Altolaguirre (1905–1959), poet
- Antonio Molina (1928–1992), singer
- Jesús Franco (1930–2013), film director and musician
- Chiquito de la Calzada (1932–2017), comedian
- Antonio Luque (1941–), engineer and photovoltaics pioneer
- Jorge Rando (1941–), artist
- Juan Madrid (1943–), writer and journalist
- Pepe Romero (1944–), classical and flamenco guitarist
- Marisol or Pepa Flores (1948–), singer and actress
- Amparo Muñoz (1954–2011), Miss Universe Spain 1974, Miss Universe 1974
- Antonio Soler (1956-), novelist
- Antonio Banderas (1960–), actor
- Miguel Ángel Jiménez (1964–), professional golfer
- Carlos Álvarez (1966–), baritone
- Antonio de la Torre (1968–), actor
- María del Mar Rodríguez Carnero, La Mari (1975–), singer
- Miguel de Miguel (1975–), actor
- Dani Rovira (1980–), comedian and actor
- Juan García Postigo (1981–), Mister World 2007
- Pablo López (1984–), singer
- Azahara Muñoz (1987–), professional golfer
- Ana López Rodríguez, Anni B Sweet (1987–), singer
- Pablo Alborán (1989–), singer
- Vanesa Martín (1980–), singer
- Joe Atlan (1989–), musician
- María Dávila (1990–), painter
- Isco Alarcón (1992–), footballer
- Miguel Herrán (1996–), actor
- Pilar Medina (1956–), Miss International 1977
- Zaccharie Risacher (2005–), NBA basketball player
- Julia López Ramírez (2003–), LPGA professional golfer
- David Alcaide (1978-), professional pool player
- Celia Villalobos (1949–), politician, former mayor of Málaga and Minister of Health.
- Diana Navarro (1978–), singer and composer.
- Brahim Díaz (1999–), professional footballer.

== International relations ==
=== Twin towns – sister cities ===
Málaga is twinned with:

- Mobile, United States; since 23 February 1965.
- Popayán, Colombia; since October 1979.
- Passau, Germany; since September 1987.
- Tyre, Lebanon; since 2016.
- Zacatecas, Mexico; since 17 June 1988.

== See also ==
- Malaga (wine)
- List of municipalities in Málaga
