= History of Málaga =

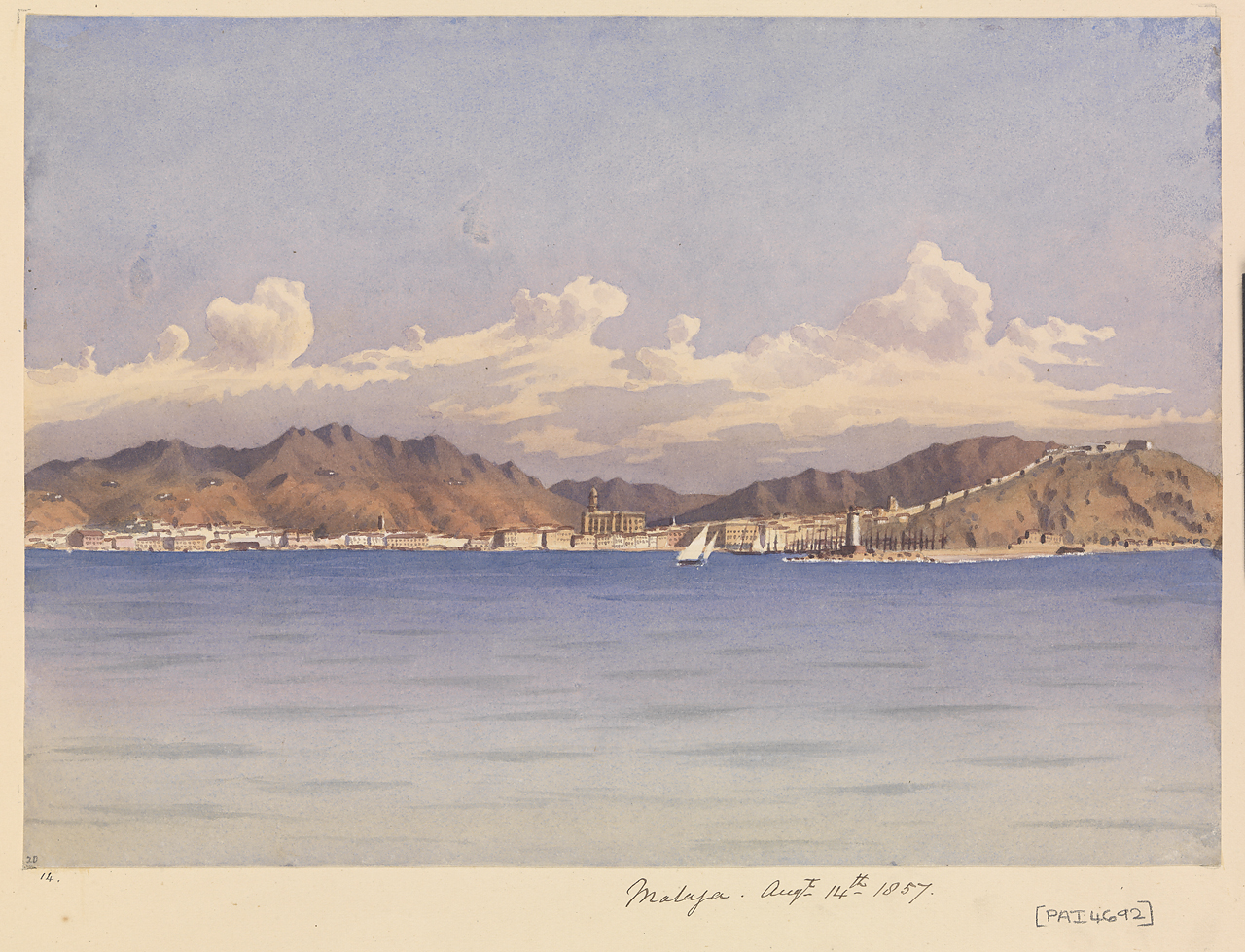
Málaga, by Edward Gennys Fanshawe, 1857

The history of Málaga, shaped by the city's location in southern Spain on the western shore of the Mediterranean Sea, spans about 2,800 years, making it one of the oldest cities in the world. The first inhabitants to settle the site may have been the Bastetani, an ancient Iberian tribe. The Phoenicians founded their colony of Malaka (Punic: 𐤌𐤋𐤊𐤀 mlkʾ) (Ancient Greek: Μάλακα, Málaka) about 770 BC. From the 6th century BC, it was under the hegemony of Carthage in present-day Tunisia. From 218 BC, Malaca was ruled by the Roman Republic; it was federated with the Roman Empire at the end of the 1st century during the reign of Domitian. Thereafter it was governed under its own municipal code, the Lex Flavia Malacitana, which granted free-born persons the privileges of Roman citizenship.

The decline of the Roman imperial power in the 5th century led to invasions of Hispania Baetica by Germanic peoples, who were opposed by the Byzantine Empire. In Visigothic Spain, the Byzantines took Malaca and other cities on the southeastern coast and founded the new province of Spania in 552. Malaca became one of the principal cities of the short-lived Byzantine Provincia Spaniae, which lasted until 624, when the Byzantines were expelled from the Iberian Peninsula. After the Muslim conquest of Spain (711–718), the city, then known as Mālaqah (Arabic: مالقة), was encircled by walls, next to which Genoese and Jewish merchants settled in their own quarters. In 1026 it became the capital of the Taifa of Málaga, an independent Muslim kingdom ruled by the Hammudid dynasty in the Caliphate of Córdoba, which existed for four distinct time-periods: from 1026 to 1057, from 1073 to 1090, from 1145 to 1153 and from 1229 to 1239, when it was finally conquered by the Nasrid Kingdom of Granada.

The siege of Mālaqa by Isabella and Ferdinand in 1487 was one of the longest of the Reconquista. The Muslim population was punished for its resistance by enslavement or death. Under Castilian domination, churches and convents were built outside the walls to unite the Christians and encourage the formation of new neighborhoods. In the 16th century, the city entered a period of slow decline, exacerbated by epidemics of disease, several successive poor food crops, floods, and earthquakes.

With the advent of the 18th century the city began to recover some of its former prosperity. For much of the 19th century, Málaga was one of the most rebellious cities of the country, contributing decisively to the triumph of Spanish liberalism. Although this was a time of general political, economic and social crisis in Málaga, the city was a pioneer of the Industrial Revolution on the Iberian Peninsula, becoming the first industrialised city in Spain. This began the ascendancy of powerful Málagan bourgeois families, some of them gaining influence in national politics. In the last third of the century, during the short regime of the First Spanish Republic, the social upheavals of the Cantonal Revolution of 1873 culminated in the proclamation of the Canton of Málaga on 22 July 1873. Málaga political life then was characterised by a radical and extremist tone. The federal republican (republicanismo federal) movement gained strong support among the working classes and encouraged insurrection, producing great alarm among the affluent.

A new decline of the city began in 1880. The economic crisis of 1893 forced the closing of the La Constancia iron foundry and was accompanied by the collapse of the sugar industry and the spread of the phylloxera blight, which devastated the vineyards surrounding Málaga. The early 20th century was a period of economic readjustment that produced a progressive industrial dismantling and fluctuating development of commerce. Economic depression, social unrest and political repression made it possible for petite bourgeois republicanism and the labor movement to consolidate their positions.

In 1933, during the Second Spanish Republic, Málaga elected the first deputy of the Communist Party of Spain, or Partido Comunista de España (PCE). In February 1937 the nationalist army, with the help of Italian volunteers, launched an offensive against the city under the orders of General Queipo de Llano, occupying it on 7 February. Local repression by the Francoist military dictatorship was perhaps the harshest of the civil war, with an estimated 17,000–20,000 citizens shot and buried in mass graves at the cemetery of San Rafael.

During the military dictatorship, the city experienced the rapid expansion of tourism from abroad on the Costa del Sol, igniting an economic boom in the city beginning in the 1960s. After the end of the Francoist military dictatorship, the first candidate for mayor on the ticket of the Spanish Socialist Workers Party or Partido Socialista Obrero Español (PSOE) was elected, and remained in office until 1995, when the conservative Popular Party or Partido Popular (PP) won the municipal elections and have governed since.

== Prehistory and antiquity ==
The territory now occupied by the Province of Málaga has been inhabited since prehistoric times, as evidenced by the cave paintings of the Cueva de la Pileta (Cave of the Pool) in Benaoján, artefacts found at sites such as the Dolmen of Menga near Antequera and the Cueva del Tesoro (Treasure Cave) near Rincón de la Victoria, as well as the pottery, tools and skeletons found in Nerja. Paintings of seals from the Paleolithic and post-Paleolithic eras found in the Nerja Caves and attributed to Neanderthals may be about 42,000 years old and could be the first known works of art, according to José Luis Sanchidrián of the University of Córdoba.

=== Phoenician Malake ===
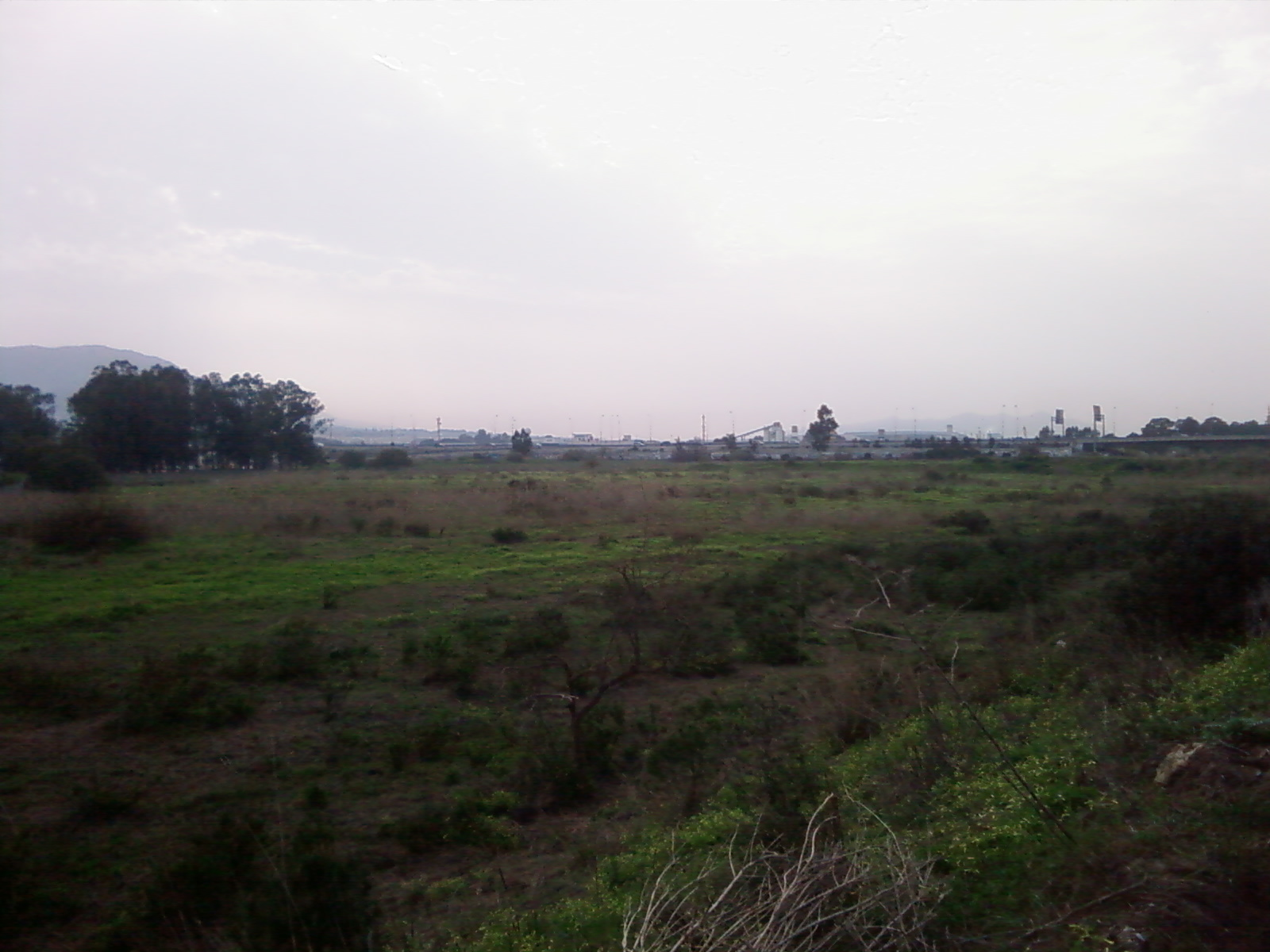
Archaeological site of Cerro del Villar

The first colonial settlement in the area, dating from around 770 BC, was made by seafaring Phoenicians from Tyre, on an islet in the estuary of the River Guadalhorce at Cerro del Villar (the coastline of Málaga has changed considerably since that time, as river silting and changes in river levels have filled the ancient estuary and moved the site inland).

Although the island was ill-suited for habitation, it is likely the Tyrians chose to settle it because of its strategic location, the possibilities for trade, and the excellent natural harbor. Sailboats heading towards the Strait of Gibraltar would have found protection there from powerful sea-currents and strong westerly winds. From Cerro del Villar, the Phoenicians began trading with coastal indigenous villages and the small community at present-day San Pablo near the mouth of the river Guadalmedina. Gradually the center of commerce was moved to the mainland and the new trading colony of Malake was founded, which was from the 8th century BC a vibrant commercial center.

The Phoenician colonial period lasted approximately from 770 to 550 BC. Economic development in the colony at Cerro del Villar, later to become Malaka, included industries for the production of sea salt and of purple dye. The Phoenicians had discovered in the waters off the coast murex sea snails, the source of the famed Tyrian purple. As in other Phoenician colonies, Malaka's urban development was associated with religious devotion, demonstrated by the centrality accorded the religious emporium or temple before Malaka's urban core was laid out in this section of the city.

Phoenician trade routes

The dominance of the Phoenicians as a Mediterranean trading power waned after Babylonian king Nebuchadnezzar finally took the city of Tyre, sometime around 572 BC, after a lengthy series of campaigns. According to the Cyropaedia, Xenophon's mostly fictitious biography of Cyrus the Great, the founder of the Achaemenid Empire conquered Phoenicia in 539 BC, but many scholars believe this information is dubious. While the influence of the Phoenicians declined, it did not disappear entirely in the western Mediterranean, however, as their place was taken by the Carthaginians, whose capital city of Carthage had been founded as a Phoenician trading outpost in 814 BC. It is likely that much of the Phoenician population migrated to Carthage and other colonies following the Persian conquest. Having gained independence around 650 BC, Carthage soon developed its own considerable mercantile presence in the Mediterranean.

=== Greek Mainake ===
The Phoenician settlements were more densely concentrated on the coastline east of Gibraltar than they were further up the coast. Market rivalry had attracted the Greeks to Iberia, who established their own trading colonies along the northeastern coast before venturing into the Phoenician corridor. They were encouraged by the Tartessians, who may have desired to end the Phoenician economic monopoly. Herodotus mentions that around 630 BC, the Phocaeans established relations with King Arganthonios (670–550 BC) of Tartessos, who gave them money to build walls around their city. Later they founded Mainake (Ancient Greek: Μαινάκη, Mainákē) on the Málaga coast (Strabo. 3.4.2).

=== Dominion of Carthage ===
Nebuchadnezzar II had recaptured mainland Tyre and Sidon from Amasis II sometime between 572 and 562 BC, with the intention of appropriating the rich Tyrian trade. After his successful siege of Tyre, and with the transition to Carthaginian domination of the western Mediterranean, Malaka became in 573 BC a colony of the Punic empire of Carthage, which sent its own settlers. The mercantile nature of the city, which developed during Phoenician rule, had taken hold, as well as such idiosyncratic cultural features as the religious cults devoted to the gods Melqart and Tanit.

The second half of the sixth century BC marks the transition between the Phoenician and the Punic periods of Málaga.

When the Phoenician city-states of the eastern Mediterranean were assimilated into the Persian empire in the 6th century BC, Carthage took advantage of their diminishing control over maritime trade. For two hundred years the Phoenician settlements had maintained close relationships with the "mother cities" on the coast of Syria and Lebanon, but from the mid-6th century, these connections shifted to the north African city of Carthage as it expanded its hegemony. With the arrival of the Magonid dynasty around 550 BC, Carthaginian foreign policy seems to have changed dramatically. Carthage now took the lead, establishing itself as the dominant Phoenician military power in the western Mediterranean. Although a Punic-Etruscan fleet of 120 ships was defeated by a Greek force of Phocaean ships in the naval Battle of Alalia between 540 BC and 535 BC, and Carthage lost two more major naval battles with Massalia, it still managed to close the Strait of Gibraltar to Greek shipping and thus contained the Greek expansion in Spain by 480 BC.

Carthage proceeded to destroy Tartessos and to drive the Greeks from southern Iberia. It defended its trade monopoly in the western Mediterranean vigilantly, attacking the merchant ships of its rivals. During the 3rd century BC, Carthage made Iberia the new base for its empire and its campaigns against the Roman Republic. Although they had little influence in the hinterland behind the coastal mountains, the Carthaginians occupied most of Andalusia, expanding along the northern Mediterranean coast and establishing a new capital at Cartagena.

The Romans conquered the city as well as the other regions under the rule of Carthage after the Punic Wars in 218 BC.

=== Roman Malaca ===
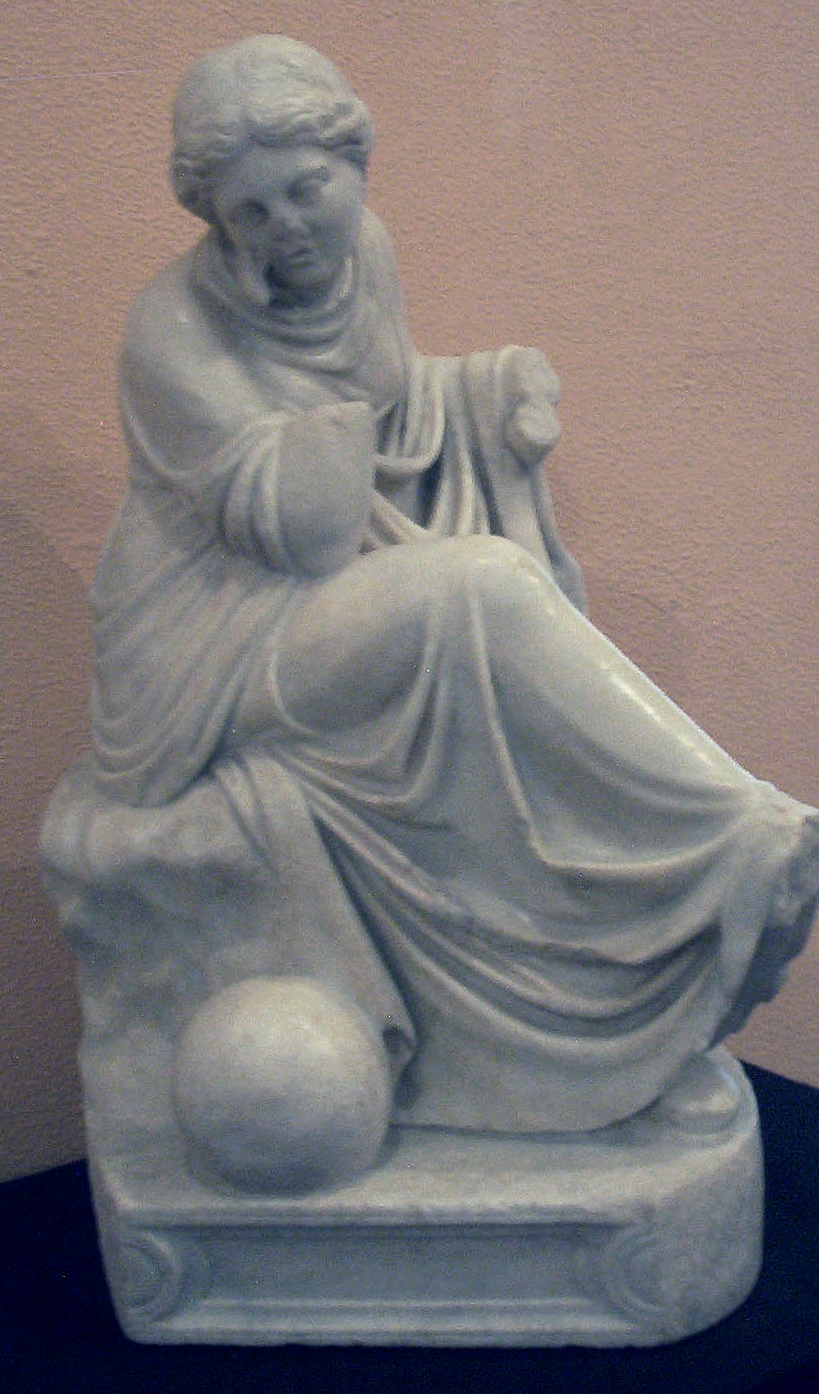
Roman statue of Urania, the muse of Astronomy. It decorated the peristyle of a villa near Malaca.

The romanisation of Málaga was, as in most of southern Hispania Ulterior, effected peacefully through a foedus aequum, a treaty recognising both parties as equals, obligated to assist each other in defensive wars or when otherwise summoned. The Romans unified the people of the coast and interior under a common power; Roman settlers in Malaca exploited the local natural resources and introduced Latin as the language of the ruling classes, establishing new manners and customs that gradually changed the culture of the native people. Malaca was integrated into the Roman Republic as part of Hispania Ulterior, but Romanisation seems to have progressed slowly, as indicated by the discovery of inscriptions dating to the 1st century AD written in the Phoenician alphabet. During this period the Municipium Malacitanum became a transit point on the Via Herculea, which revitalised the city both economically and culturally by connecting it with other developed enclaves in the interior of Hispania and with other ports of the Mediterranean Sea.

With the fall of the Republic and the advent of the Roman Empire, the territory of Malaca, which had already been occupied for two centuries by the Romans, was framed administratively as one of four legal convents into which the province of Baetica, newly created by order of Caesar Augustus, was divided. Baetica by this time was rich and completely Romanised; the emperor Vespasian rewarded the province by granting it the ius latii, which extended the rights of Roman citizenship (latinitas) to its inhabitants, an honor that secured the loyalty of the Baetian elite and the middle class.

According to the Greek geographer Strabo, the city had an irregular plan, in the manner of the Phoenician cities. The Romans began the construction of important public works: the Flavian dynasty improved the port and Augustus built the Roman theater. Thereafter the emperor Titus of the Flavian family granted Malaca its privileges as a municipality.

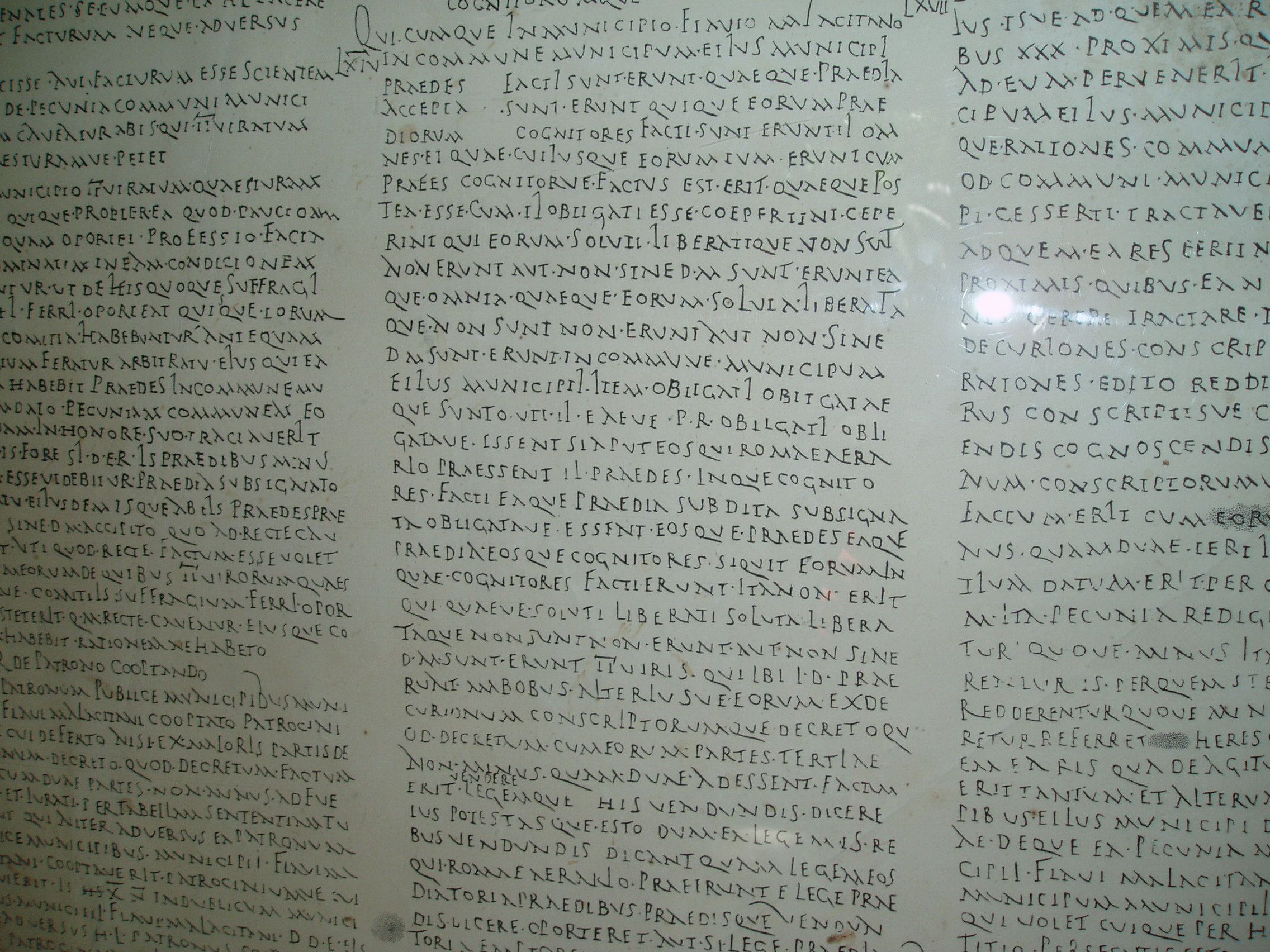
Reproduction of the Lex Flavia Malacitana, Loringiano Museum

Malaca reached a high cultural and civic development in this period, having been converted into a federated city of the empire, and was governed by its own code of laws, the Lex Flavia Malacitana. The presence of an educated populace and their patronage of the arts had a significant bearing on this. The great Roman baths, remains of which have been found in the subsoil of the Pintor Nogales and the Cistercian Abbey, also belong to this period, as well as numerous sculptures now preserved in the Museo de Málaga.

The Roman Roman theater, which dates from the 1st century BC, was rediscovered by accident in 1951. The theater is well preserved but has not been completely excavated. The Augustan character of the inscriptions found there date it from this period. The theater appears to have been abandoned in the 3rd century, as it was covered with a dump rich in small finds of the 3rd–4th centuries. The upper part of the stage was not covered, and its material was reused by the Arabs in the Alcazaba.

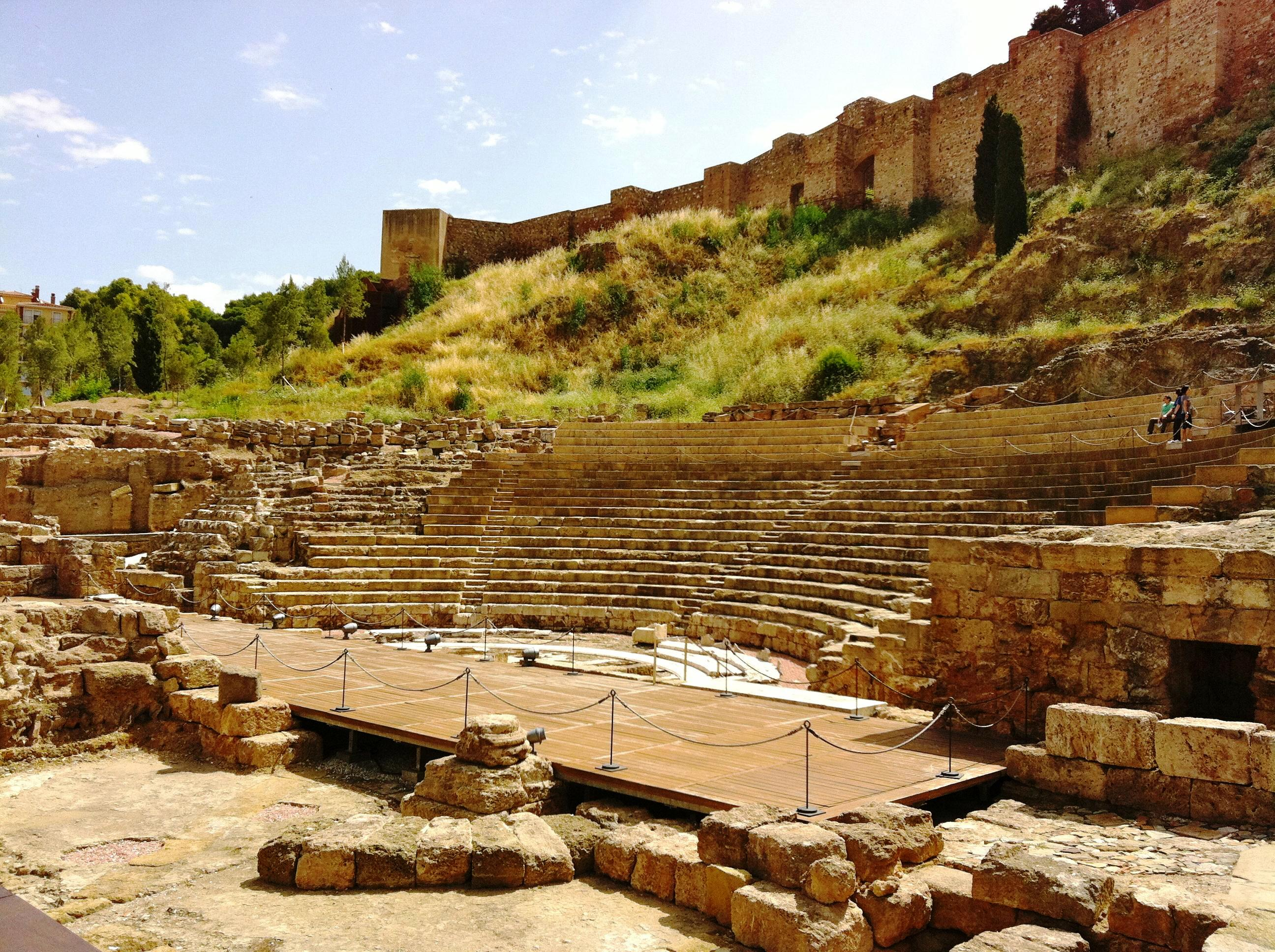
Roman amphitheatre

The economy and the wealth of the territory were dependent mainly on agriculture in the inland areas, the abundance of the fishery in the waters off the coast, and the productions of local artisanal works. Among noteworthy Malacan products for export were wine, olive oil and the garum malacitano, a fermented fish sauce famed throughout the empire and in demand as a luxury item in Rome. Regarding the social aspects of religious practice in Malaca, it can be said that each ethnic group adhered to its own cult, as did imported slaves who clung to their native religions. In 325, the year of the Council of Nicaea, Malaca figured as one of the few Roman enclaves in Hispania where Christianity was strongly rooted. Previously, there had been frequent uprisings of an anti-Roman character catalyzed by the opposition to paganism of those Hispano-Romans affiliated with Christianity.

Spain's present languages, its religion, and the basis of its laws originate from the Roman period. The centuries of uninterrupted Roman rule and settlement left a deep and enduring imprint upon the culture of what is now Málaga.

=== Germanic invasions and Visigothic rule ===
In the 5th century, Germanic peoples, including the Franks, Suevi, Vandals, and Visigoths, as well as the Alans of Sarmatian descent, crossed the Pyrenees mountain range into the Iberian peninsula. The Visigoths eventually emerged as the dominant power, and in about 511, they moved onto the Malaca coast. However, Hispania remained relatively Romanised under their rule—it did not see a decline in the perpetuation of classical culture comparable to that in Britain, Gaul, Lombardy and Germany. The Visigoths adopted Roman culture and language, and maintained more of the old Roman institutions. They had a respect for the legal codes that resulted in continuous frameworks and historical records for most of the period between 415, when Visigothic rule in parts of Spain began, and 711, when it is traditionally said to end. The Catholic bishops were the rivals of Visigothic power and culture until the end of the 6th and beginning of the 7th century—the period of transition from Arianism to Catholicism in the Visigothic kingdom—excepting a brief incursion of Byzantine power.

Under Visigothic rule, Malaca became an episcopal see. The earliest known bishop was Patricius, consecrated about 290, and present at the Council of Eliberis (Elvira).

After the division of the Roman Empire and its final crisis in 476, Malaca was one of the areas of the peninsula affected by further migrations of the Germanic tribes, especially the Silingi Vandals, who during the 5th century introduced the Arian heresy to western Europe. The province lost much of the wealth and infrastructure achieved under Roman rule, but maintained a certain prosperity, even as it suffered the destruction of some of its most important towns, as at Acinipo, Nescania, and Singilia Barba, which were not rebuilt.

=== Byzantine Malaca ===
Visigothic Hispania and the Byzantine province of Spania circa 560 AD

The Byzantine Emperor Justinian I (482–565) conceived a military and foreign policy, the renovatio imperii, to recover the territories which had formerly comprised the Western Roman Empire and were under the rule of the barbarians. It was led by his brilliant general, Belisarius, and succeeded in regaining North Africa, southern Iberia and most of Italy. Malaca and the surrounding territory were conquered in 552; Malaca then became one of the most important cities of the Byzantine province of Spania.

The city was conquered and sacked again by the Visigoths under King Sisebut in 615. In 625, during the reigns of the Visigothic king Suintila (or Swinthil) and the Byzantine Emperor Heraclius, the Byzantines definitively abandoned their last settlements in the narrow area they still held.

It is known that Sisebut devastated much of the city, and although it remained an episcopal see and the site of a mint built by Sisenand, its population was drastically reduced and its prosperous economy ruined. There is clear documentary evidence of the violent destruction of at least one commercial district. Such was the devastation that the first Islamic invaders of the old Visigothic county of Malacitana initially had to locate their capital in the interior, at Archidona.

== Eight centuries of Muslim rule ==
The Chronicle of 754, covering the years 610 to 754, indicates the Arabs began disorganised raids and only undertook to conquer the peninsula with the fortuitous deaths of Roderic and much of the Visigothic nobility. They were probably killed at the Battle of Guadalete against an invading force of Muslim Arabs and Berbers under the command of Ṭāriq ibn Ziyad. Roderic was the last king of the Visigoths, but his disputed succession to the throne and the resulting internal conflict may have contributed to the collapse of the Visigoth kingdom before the advance of the Moorish invaders. The Visigoths elected their kings outright rather than making the throne hereditary by right of succession, but Roderic had apparently led a coup and usurped the throne in 711. Hearing of Tariq's landing, Roderic had gathered his followers and engaged the Arab-Berber invaders, making several expeditions against them before he was deserted by his troops and killed in battle in 712. After Roderic's defeat, the Muslim armies, reinforced by more troops from Africa, faced little opposition as they moved north. By 714, the Muslims were in control of all of Hispania, except for a narrow strip along the north coast. Malacitana was settled by Arabs and Berbers, while much of the indigenous population fled into the mountains. The Muslims called the city Mālaqa (Arabic: مالقة), designating it as part of the region of al-Andalus. The military and political leader Abd al-Aziz ibn Musa became governor of the city, but his tenure did not last long. For forty years following his assassination in 716, al-Andalus was filled with chaos and turmoil as the Hispano-Romano residents rebelled against Muslim rule, until in 743 Málaga came decisively under Arab domination.

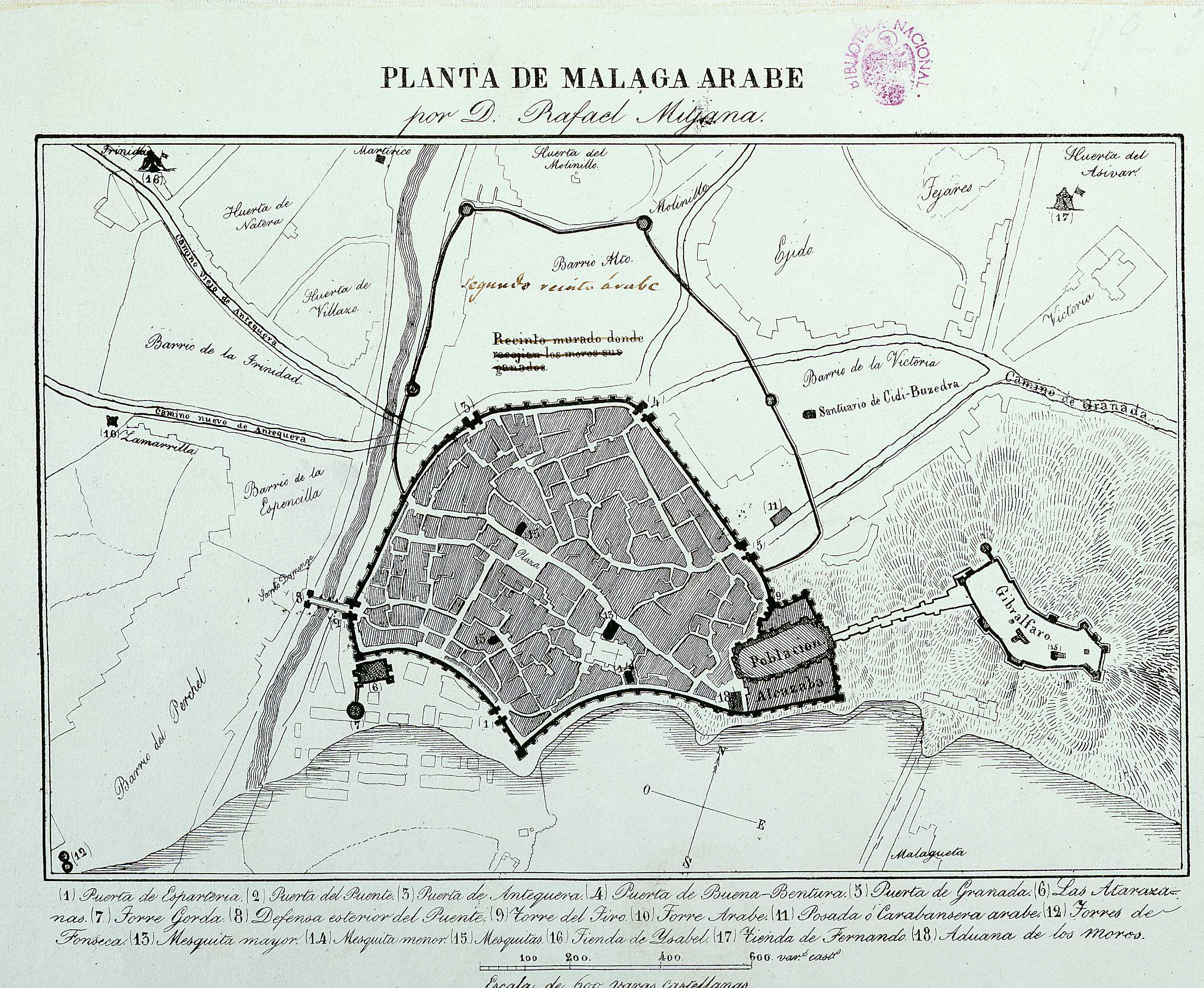
A 19th-century reconstruction of Moorish Malaqah

The invading forces were mostly Berber tribesmen from the Maghreb (the northwest of Africa), under Arab leadership. They and the other Muslim soldiers fighting with them were united by their religion. After the battle of Guadalete the city passed into the hands of the Arabs, and the bishopric was suppressed. Málaga then became for a time a possession of the Caliphate of Cordova. After the fall of the Umayyad dynasty, it became the capital of a distinct kingdom (taifa), dependent on Granada.

The Muladi or Muwallads, were in almost constant revolt against the Arab and Berber immigrants who had carved out large estates for themselves, which were farmed by Christian serfs or slaves. The most famous of these revolts was led by a rebel named Umar ibn Hafsun in the region of Málaga and the Ronda mountains. Ibn Hafsun ruled over several mountain valleys for nearly forty years, having the castle Bobastro (Arabic: بُبَشْتَر) as his residence. He rallied disaffected muwallads and mozárabs to his cause, and eventually renounced Islam in 889 with his sons and became a Christian. He took the name Samuel and proclaimed himself not only the leader of the Christian nationalist movement, but also the champion at the same time of a regular crusade against Islam. However, his conversion soon cost him the support of most of his Muwallad supporters who had no intention of ever becoming Christians, and led to the gradual erosion of his power.

When Hafs, son of Umar ibn Hafsun, finally laid down his arms in 928 and surrendered the town of Bobastro, Abd-al-Rahman III imposed the Islamic system of civil organisation in Mālaqa province. This allowed a new population distribution that encouraged urban development and the proliferation of farms in rural areas, as opposed to the pattern of feudalism dominant in the rest of Europe. The farmers practiced intensive irrigation-based agriculture, while artisanry and trade flourished in the cities—leading to prosperity and an era of peace in the province.

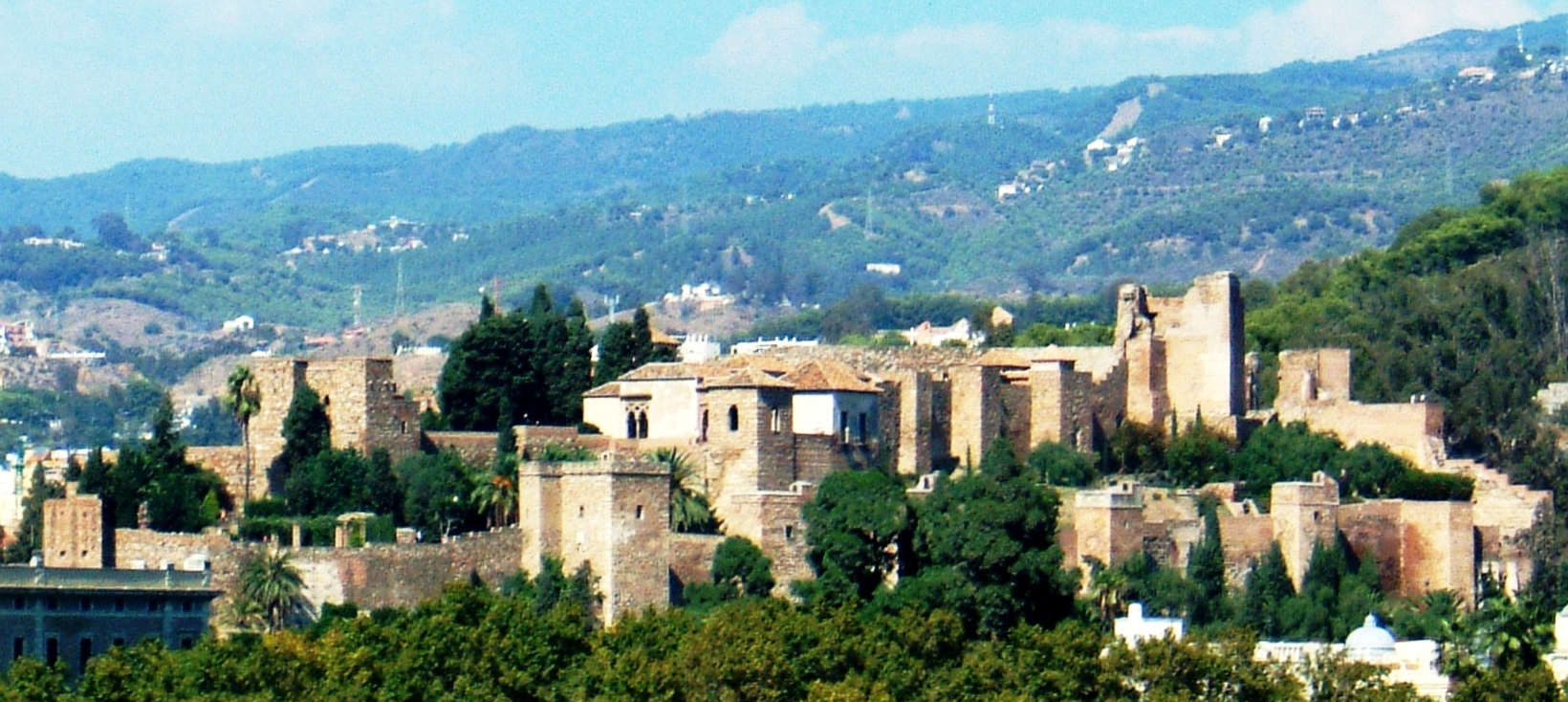
Alcazaba of Málaga

Surrounded by a walled enclosure with five large gates, Mālaqa city itself thrived; the Alcazaba, a Moorish citadel, was built in the mid-11th century on Mount Gibralfaro, a hill in the center of the city overlooking the port. The fortress comprised two walled enclosures situated to conform to the steep terrain. The Alcazaba was fortified with three walls towards the sea, and two facing the town. Antonio de Nebrija counted, in the circumference of the castle, 110 large towers, and a great number of turrets, the largest of which were those that surrounded the Atarazanas. New suburbs formed as the city expanded, including walled neighborhoods, within which evolved the adarves characteristic of medieval Islamic cities; these were streets leading to private homes, with a gate at the beginning. The banks of the Wad-al-Medina (Guadalmedina river) were lined with orchards, and crossed from east to west by a route that connected the harbor and the fortress inside the city walls. Near the enclosure rose neighborhoods settled by Genoese and Jewish merchants, independent of the rest of the city. The Jewish quarter of the medina produced one of Mālaqa's most illustrious sons: the Jewish philosopher and poet, Solomon Ibn Gabirol, who would be the first to use the term "Paradise City" to refer to his hometown.

Besides the splendid Alcazaba, the marble gate of the Nasrid shipyards (atarazanas), and part of the Jewish quarter, other vestiges of Moorish Mālaqa remain today: a section of the monumental cemetery of Yabal Faruh, considered the largest in Andalusian Spain, has been excavated on the slopes of Mount Gibralfaro. Two burial mosques, part of a mausoleum, and the remains of a pantheon (a temple dedicated to all the gods) have been preserved as well on Calle Agua. The mosques date from the 12th and 13th centuries and were built on a quadrangular plan with single naves and mihrabs.

=== Taifa of Mālaqa ===
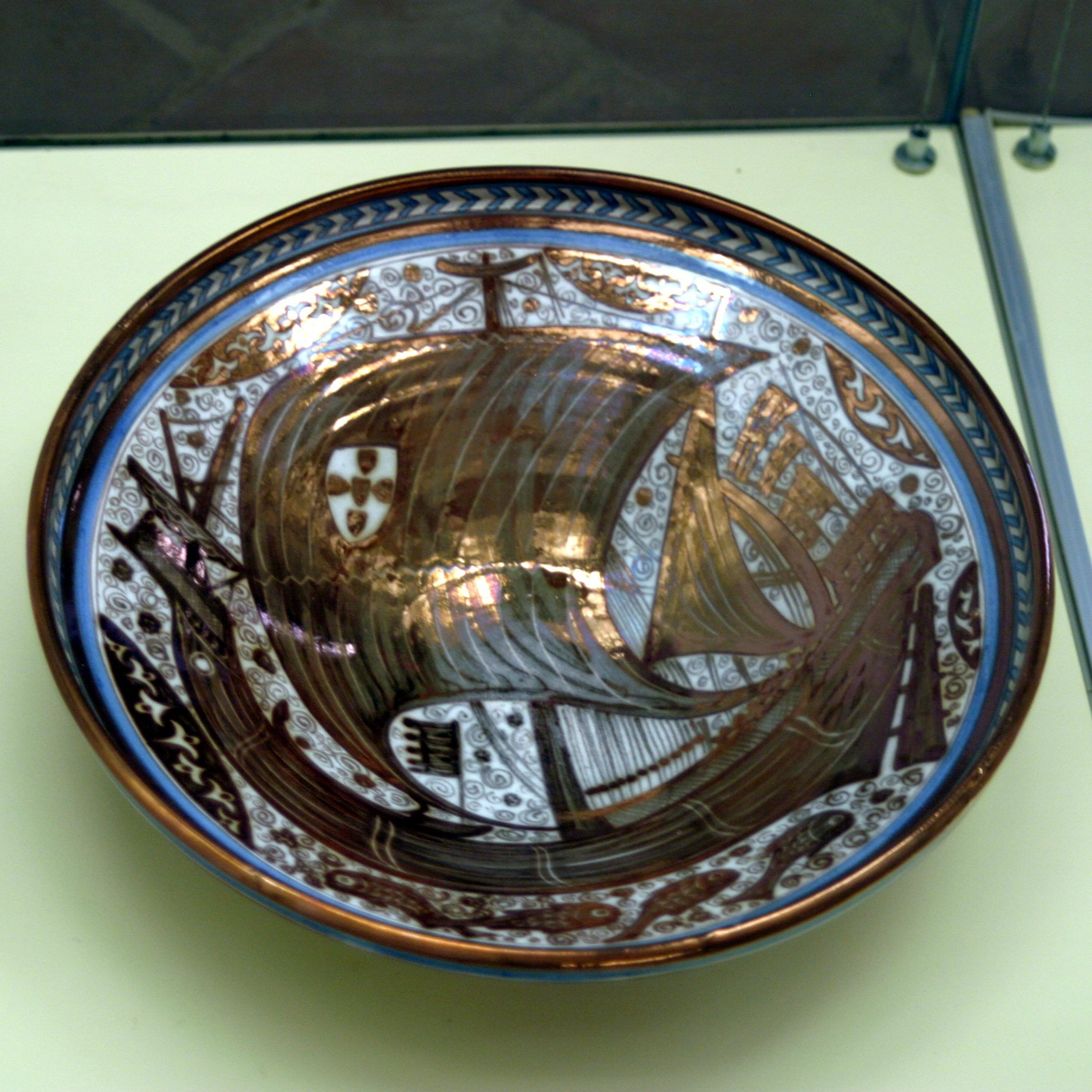
Málaga lusterware found at the Alcazaba

In 1026 Mālaqa became the capital of the Taifa of Málaga, an independent Muslim kingdom which existed for four distinct periods: it was ruled by the Hammudid dynasty as the Rayya Cora in the Caliphate of Córdoba from 1026 to 1057, by the Zirí dynasty from 1073 to 1090, by the Hassoun from 1145 to 1153 and the Zannun from 1229 to 1239 when it was finally conquered by the Nasrid Kingdom of Granada. Vestiges of the urban plan of this era are preserved in the historical center: in its two principal monuments, the Alcazaba and the castle of Gibralfaro; and La Coracha, a walled passage of double ramparts built to secure communication between the fortress and the Alcazaba. Mālaqa had two suburbs outside the walls and enjoyed a thriving trade with the Maghreb. The city had an important pottery industry—terra cotta tiles were fired there and its ornamental vases, called Málagan lusterware, came to be recognised throughout the Mediterranean. Trade was regulated by the "Proper Governance of the Souk", a treatise on Hisba (business accountability) written by Abu Abd Allah al-Saqati of Mālaqa, in the 13th century.

=== Nasrid Mālaqa ===
After the death in 1238 of Ibn Zannun, the last king of the Mālaqa Taifa, the city was captured in 1239 by Muhammad I of Granada and became part of the Moorish kingdom of Granada. His brother Isma`il became the governor of Mālaqa during Mohammed's reign (until 1257). When Isma'il died, Mohammed ibn Al-Ahamar raised his nephews Mohammed and Abu Said Faraj, the latter of whom would become governor of Mālaqa in his father's place. Mālaqa remained under the rule of the Nasrid dynasty till the reconquista of the Catholic Monarchs.

During the reign of the Nasrids, Mālaqa became a center of shipbuilding and international trade.

In 1279, Muhammad II signed an economic and trade agreement with the Republic of Genoa, and Genoese traders obtained a privileged position in the port. By the mid-fourteenth century, Mālaqa was the maritime gateway of the Nasrid kingdom, assuming many of the functions formerly held by Almería.

The Genoese established a network of trade centers under their control around the Mediterranean Sea and connected the Iberian trade with that of northern Africa by Atlantic routes as well. Many of these communities organised cooperative institutions known as consulados (consulates) to connect merchants regionally and internationally. A ship's registry (logbook) written by Filippo de Nigro in 1445 shows that Mālaqa was an important part of this trade network and describes the regional system controlled by the Genoese Spinola family. As a stopover on the coastal navigation routes, Mālaqa became a crucial business hub with the rise of associated commercial activity.

Fine ceramics made in Mālaqa were frequently given as diplomatic gifts. In the mid-15th century the king of Granada sent ambassadors to the Mameluke sultan in Cairo bearing them as presents. The workshops for their manufacture were located in the suburb known as Fontanalla in the foothills of the mountain El Ejido.

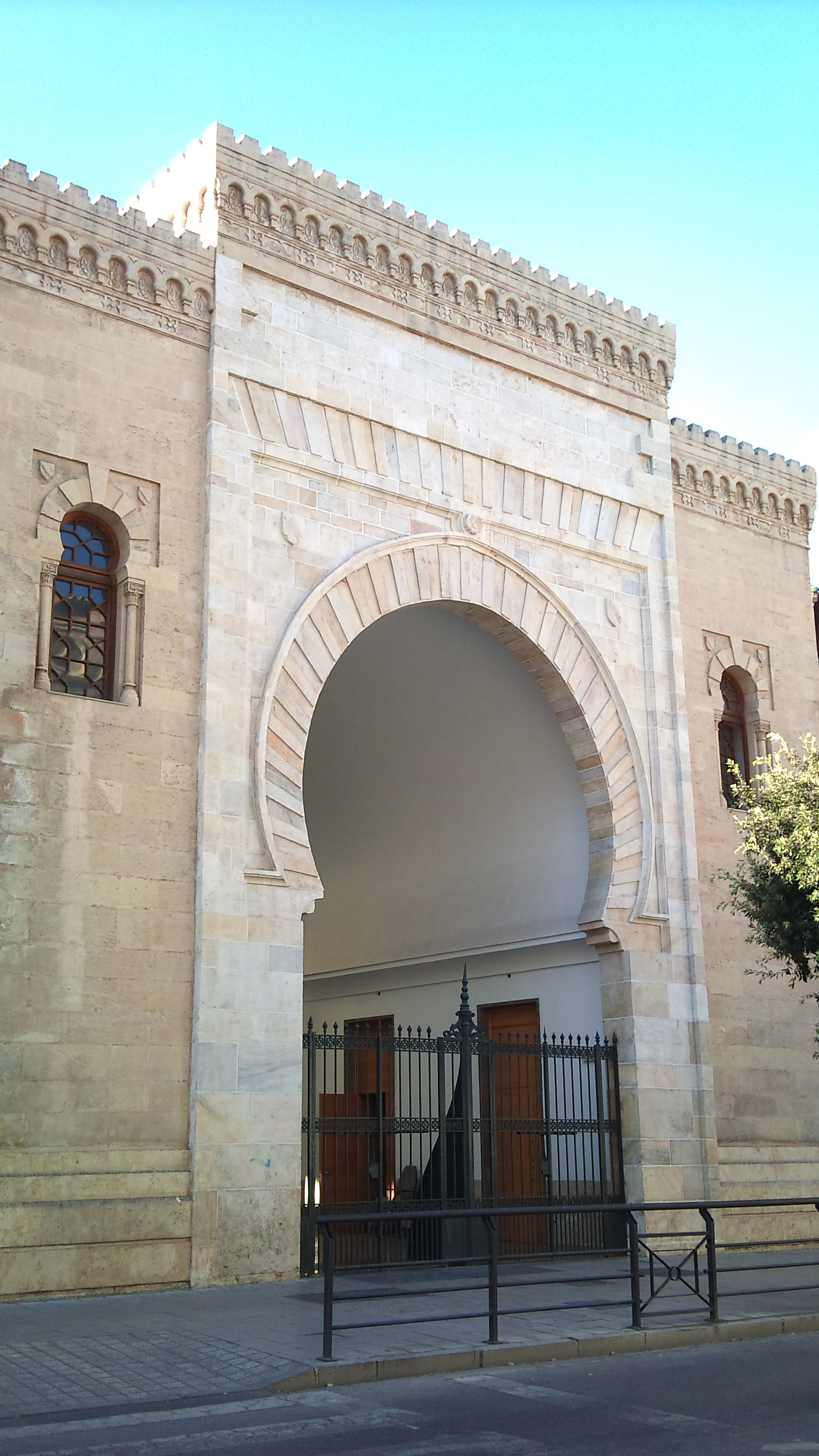
Arch of the Atarazanas

The Mālaqa shipyards, the Atarazanas, were built during the reign (1354–1391) of Mohammed V to strengthen his political and military power. The main building, constructed as a naval workshop with probably some limited use as a warehouse, was one of Mālaqa's largest and most impressive, and was noted for its seven monumental horseshoe arches. During this period the coast was further inland and the Atarazanas was at the edge of the sea, so low that the water flowed in and formed a basin capacious enough to contain 20 galleys. The walls around it were eighty feet high; the arches, for the reception of ships, were sixty feet high by thirty wide, and twelve feet thick, and each of these arches had its own gates. The southern facade was described by Hieronymus Münzer in 1494: it had six open arches providing access to a high vaulted nave with transverse ribs under which the ships anchored. The seventh arch, located on the left, and still in existence today, was the entranceway to a large columned courtyard. There are two heraldic shields above the arch, designed in Castilian style and having diagonal bands inscribed in Arabic with the Nasrid motto, Wah lâ ghâlib ilâ Allâh (There is no victor other than God). At the western corner was a square tower attached to the portal and from there a wall joined the Borch Hayta, or Torre del Clamor, which closed the natural inlet between it and the Genoese castle, which is no longer extant. The tower served as a minaret for the muezzin to call the faithful to prayer at the mosque.

At this time about 15,000 people lived in Mālaqa; most of them were Muslims strictly observant of religious orthodoxy as taught by the Fuqahā', the expert jurists of Islamic law. There was a sizable minority of Jews, while the presence of Christians was reduced to those captives taken in war, enslaved, and forced to labor in the shipyards, where light ships were built for patrolling the coast. The small colony of foreign traders was mostly Genoese. The governor of the city was typically a Moorish prince serving as a representative of the Sultan, and resided in the Alcazaba with his retinue of personal secretaries and lawyers. The large massive city walls, with their many towers, monumental gates and moat, all surmounted by the fortress of Gibralfaro, made the defences of the city nearly impregnable.

The generally mountainous land around Mālaqa did not favor agriculture, but the Muslim peasants organised an efficient irrigation system, and with their simple tools were able to grow crops on the slopes; spring wheat being the staple of their diet. An unusual feature of Mālaqi viticulture was the interplanting of grape vines and fig trees, grown mostly in the Axarquía area east of Mālaqa. The raising of livestock, absent pigs because of Muslim dietary restrictions, played only a secondary role in the local economy. The production of olives was low, and olive oil was actually imported from the Aljarafe. Other fruit and nut trees, such as figs, hazelnuts, walnuts, chestnuts, and almonds were abundant and provided important winter foodstuffs, as did the mulberry trees introduced by the Arabs, their fruit being used to make juice.

Trade in hides and skins and leatherworking was a major industry in Mālaqa, as was metalsmithing, especially of knives and scissors; gold inlaid ceramics and porcelain were manufactured as well. The production of silk textiles was still important and closely linked to the Moorish sector of the population. Light ships for patrolling the coast were built in the Atarazanas.

In 1348, while the black plague ravaged Europe, the Alcazaba and the castle of Gibralfaro took their final shape. The city had several gates that allowed passage through the walls, some of which still stand today, such as the Puerta Oscura (Dark Gate) and the Puerta del Mar (Sea Gate). Looming over the port, the Alcazaba was the Moorish citadel built on the hill called Mount Gibralfaro in the center of the city, on whose summit was the castle. The citadel and the castle were connected by a corridor known as La Coracha between two zig-zagging walls that followed the contours of the land. Erected in the 11th century, the Alcazaba combined defensive fortifications with residential palaces and inner gardens; it was fortified with three walls towards the sea, and two facing the town. Antonio de Nebrija counted, in the circumference of the castle, 110 large towers, besides a great number of turrets. The same walls also enclosed the whole compound, though each building had its own entrance. The Puerta de los Arcos (Gate of the Arch) of the Torre del Tinel (Tower of Tinel) was the entrance to the Nasrid palace in the enclosure dating to the 13th and 14th centuries. Remnants of the old city wall remain today in Calle Alamos and Calle Carreteria.

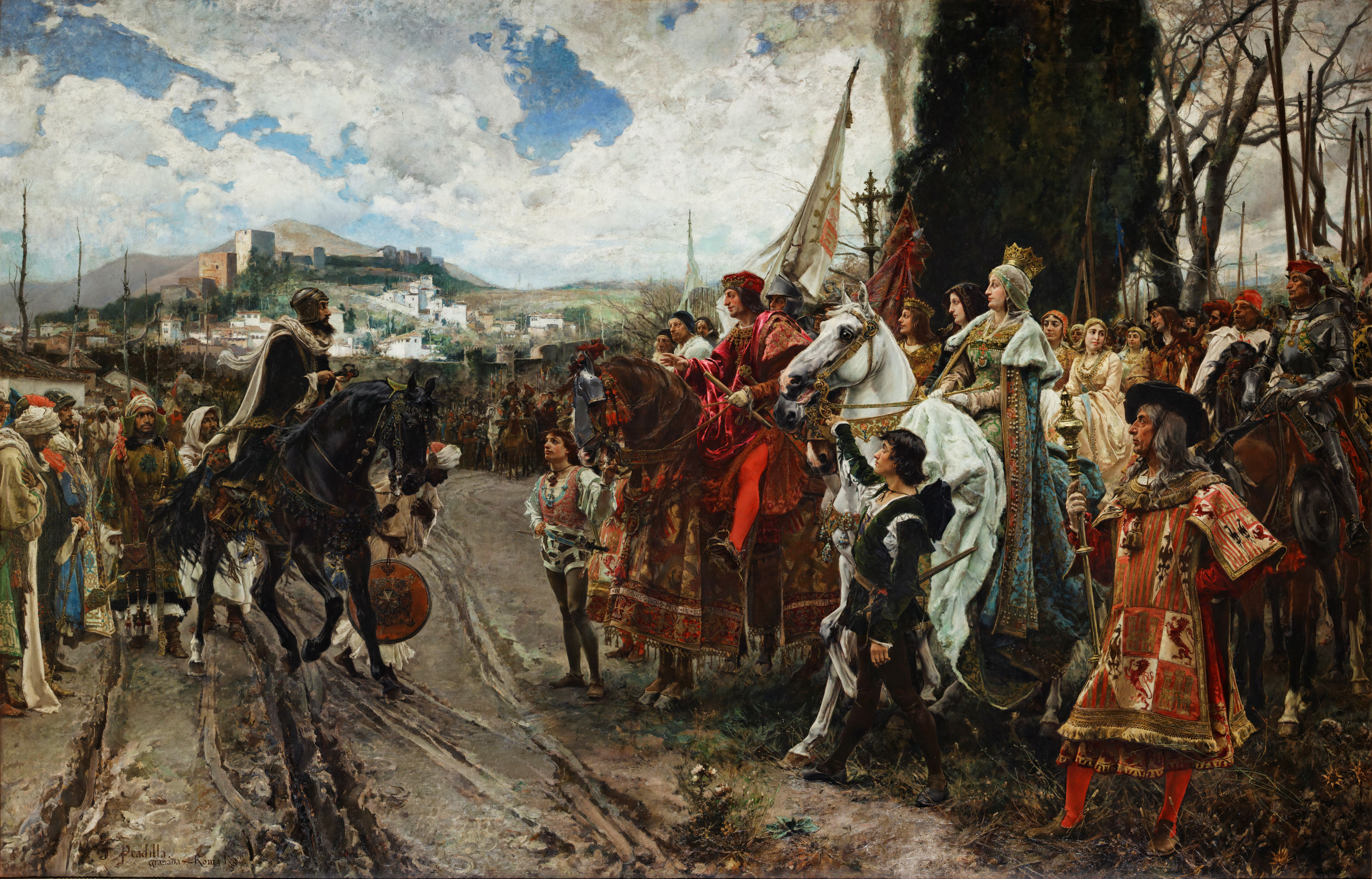
The Surrender of Granada to Ferdinand and Isabella, by Francisco Pradilla

In May 1487 Ferdinand and Isabella began their siege of Mālaqa, which after a desperate resistance was compelled to surrender. The victory was a bloody episode in the war for the conquest of the Kingdom of Granada, but the Christian religion was restored, and with it the episcopal see. The Catholic Monarchs had already taken the city of Ronda by storm on 22 May 1485. Its warden (arraez), the Moorish chieftain Hamet el Zegrí (Hamad al-Tagri), refused Ferdinand and Isabella's offer to accept his vassalage, and took refuge in Mālaqa, where he led the Muslim resistance. The siege began on May 5, 1487; the Nasrid troops held out till August, when only the Alcazaba, under the command of the merchant Ali Dordux, and the fortress of the Gibralfaro, under the command of Hamet el Zegrí and Ali Derbal, still resisted.

The Catholic Monarchs besieged Mālaqa for six months, one of the longest sieges in the Reconquista. They cut off the supplies of food and water to the city, forcing its Muslim garrison to eventually surrender. On 13 August the Castilian army, over 45,000 strong, took the city defended by 15,000 African (Maghrebi) mercenaries and Mālaqi warriors. King Ferdinand decided to make an example of the resistors and refused to grant them an honorable capitulation, The civilian population was punished by enslavement or execution, with the exception of twenty-five families allowed to stay as Mudéjar converts in the Moorish compound.

On August 18, Ali Dordux, after negotiating his group's status as mudejars, surrendered the citadel, but Gibralfaro had to be taken by assault, and its defenders were sold as slaves, while Hamet el Zegrí was executed. The conquest of Mālaqa was a final blow to the Nasrid kingdom of Granada, which lost its principal maritime port.

The troops who served in the army of the Spanish victors were paid by the customary division of properties, the repartimientos. Between 5,000 and 6,000 Christians from Extremadura, Leon, Castile, Galicia and the Levante repopulated the province, of which about a thousand settled in the capital, now called by its Castilian name, Málaga. The city spread beyond its walls with the creation of the religious convents of La Trinidad, Los Angeles, Santuario de la Victoria, and the Capuchin monastery.

== Early Modern Era ==
=== The Mudéjars (1485–1501) ===
The word Mudéjar is a Medieval Spanish corruption of the Arabic word Mudajjan (مدجن), meaning "domesticated", in reference to the Muslims who submitted to the rule of the Christian monarchs. By this means many Islamic communities survived in the Málaga area after the Reconquista, protected by the capitulations they signed during the war. These covenants were feudal in nature: the Moors recognised the sovereignty of the Catholic Monarchs, surrendered their fortresses, delivered all Christian captives, and committed to continue paying traditional taxes. In return, they received protection for their persons and property, and legal assurances that their beliefs, laws and social customs would be respected.

The Treaty of Granada had protected religious and cultural freedoms for Muslims and Jews in the imminent transition from being the Emirate of Granada to being a province of Castile. After the fall of Granada in January 1492, Mudéjars kept their protected religious status, but in the mid-16th century, they were forced to convert to Christianity. From that time, because of suspicions that they were not truly converted, they were known as Moriscos. In 1610 those who refused to convert to Christianity were expelled from Málaga.

The layout of the Muslim city was changed in the 16th century to suit the needs of the Christian conquerors, beginning with the construction of a wide road to allow the transport of merchandise from the main square, the Plaza Mayor (now Plaza de la Constitución) to the Puerta del Mar gate, in present-day Calle Nueva. At this time also the transept, nave and main chapel of the Cathedral of Málaga were built on the foundations of the old mosque. New churches and convents raised outside the walled enclosure of the city attracted the populace, leading to the formation of new neighborhoods like La Trinidad and El Perchel.

The artisanal productions of Málaga included textiles, leather, clay, metal, wood, building construction and prepared food. The city became a shipping center for export of the surplus agricultural output of the kingdoms of Cordoba, Jaen and Granada, as well as an entry point into Andalusia for a range of goods.

=== 16th–18th centuries ===
In 1585, Philip II ordered a new survey of the port, and in 1588 commissioned the building of a new dam in the eastern part, along with repairs of the Coracha. In the next two centuries the port was expanded both to the east and west.

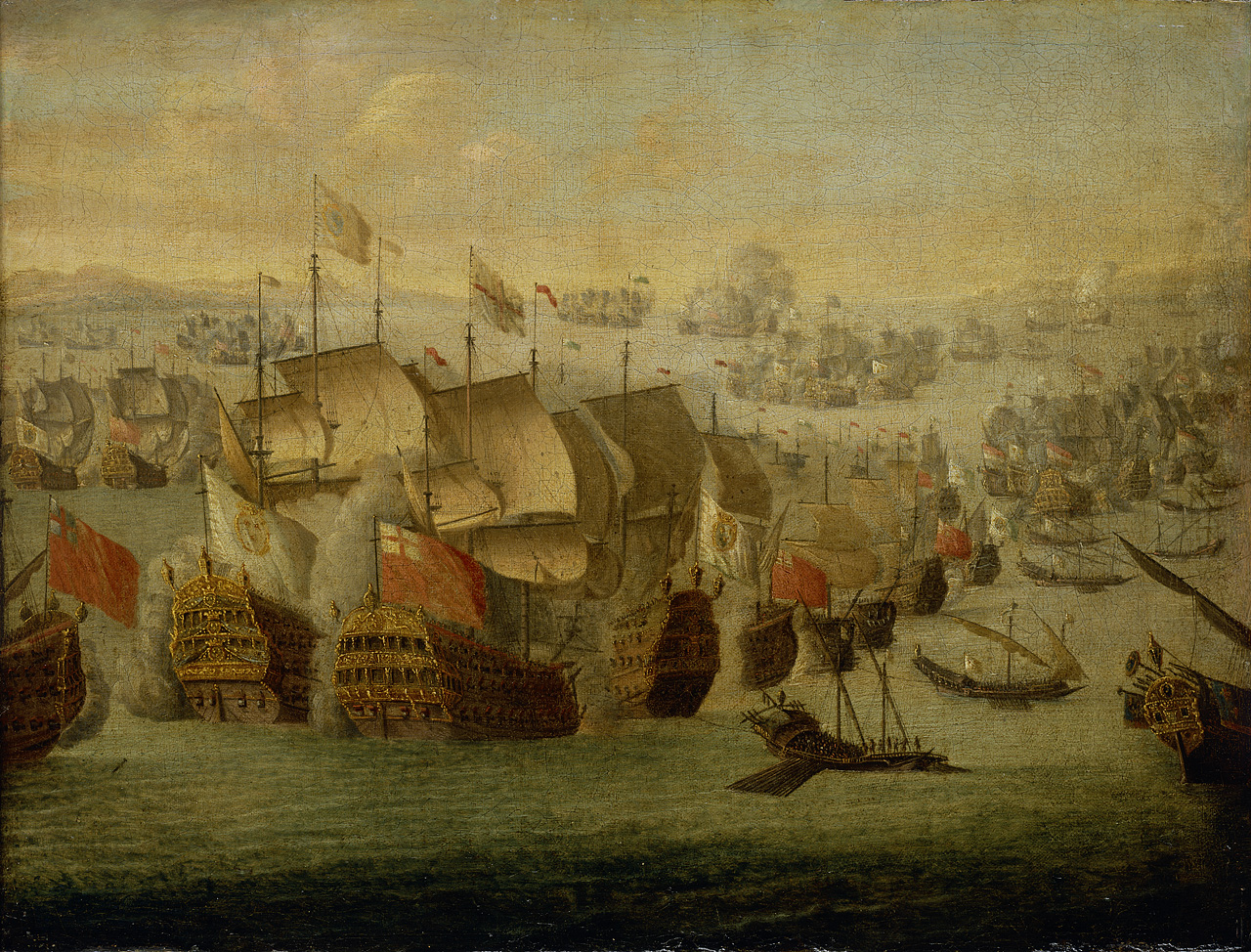
The Battle of Malaga by Isaac Sailmaker. Oil on canvas, 1704

Trade, dominated by foreign merchants, was the main source of wealth in Málaga of the 16th century, with wine and raisins as the principal commodity exports. The public works on the port as well as those on the Antequera and Velez roadways provided the necessary infrastructure for distribution of the renowned Málaga wines. The production of silk textiles was still important and closely linked to the Moorish part of the population. The real estate of the aristocracy was increased through the "refeudalization" occasioned by the sale of manors, a policy implemented by the nobility who monopolised high office. The mercantile operations of the town and its port were important to the national Spanish economy and the raising of revenue for the Habsburg government, but they suffered from the general corruption of the time, including the sale of important offices.

From the 17th century to the 18th century, the city entered a period of decline, a consequence not only of the social disruption caused by the expulsion of the Moors, but also of flooding of the Guadalmedina River and several successive crop failures. Other disasters and disruptive events of the 17th century included earthquakes, explosions of gunpowder mills, and the conscription of men to serve in battle; nevertheless, the population increased.

Málaga, as headquarters of the Capitanía General de Granada (Captaincy General of the Kingdom of Granada) on the coast played an essential role in the foreign policy of the Bourbon kings of Spain. The regional military, the supply of the North African presidios, and the defence of the Mediterranean were administered in the city. This involved massive defence spending on fortification of the harbor, the building of coastal towers and the organising of militias. The loss of Gibraltar to a Second Grand Alliance force and an inconclusive naval engagement off Málaga of 1704 made the city the key to military defence of the Strait.

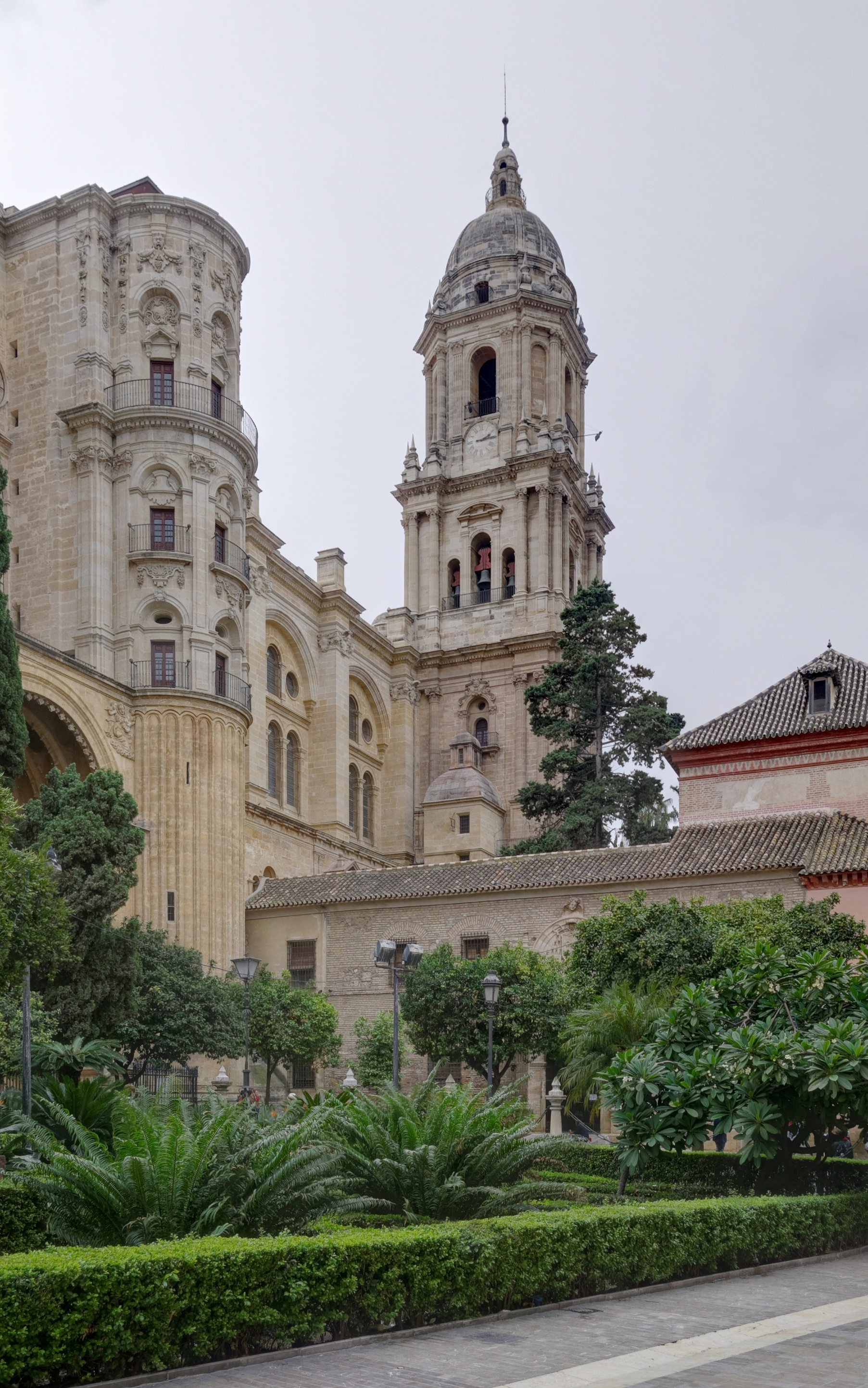
Málaga Cathedral

During the second half of the 18th century Málaga solved its chronic water supply problems with the completion of one of the largest infrastructure projects carried out in Spain at the time: the building of the Aqueduct of San Telmo, designed by the architect Martín de Aldehuela. After the success of this impressive feat of engineering, the city enjoyed an economic recovery with a new expansion of the port, the revival of the works of the cathedral, and the erection of the new Customs building, the Palacio de la Aduana, begun in 1791. The peasantry and the working classes still made up the vast majority of the population, but the emergence of a business-oriented middle-class lay the foundations for the 19th-century economic boom.

By the 18th century, the port of Málaga, the linchpin of the city's economy, was again one of the most important on Andalusia's Mediterranean coast. Following the Decree of Free Trade in 1778 by King Charles III, which allowed the Spanish American ports to trade directly with ports in Spain, commercial traffic at the port increased further, and the population grew considerably. Major urban renovations were made in Málaga under the influence of the ideas of the European Enlightenment, bestowing on it many of its most characteristic features: the cathedral, the harbor of the port and its Customs House, the Alameda, and the Antequera and Velez roadways. In 1783 a bayfront boulevard, the Paseo de la Alameda, a symbol of urban prosperity, was built on land reclaimed from the sea with sand dredged from the Guadalmedina River. By 1792 mansions had risen on either side of the avenue in the fashionable new residential area settled by the Málaga merchant class.

== 19th century ==
The 19th century was a turbulent time of political, economic and social crisis in Málaga. Spanish involvement in the War of the Third Coalition opened up her merchant fleet to attacks by Royal Navy warships while the deadly 1803–1804 epidemic of Yellow Fever killed more than 26,000 people in Málaga alone. The city suffered the further ravages of the Peninsular War, conflicts between royal absolutists and liberals, the end of the transatlantic trade with the Americas, the collapse of its industry, and finally the phylloxera epidemic that destroyed the vineyards of the region.

On 2 May 1808 the people of Madrid rebelled against the French occupation of their city; this event was followed by the abdication of the royal family in Bayonne and the proclamation of Napoleon's brother Joseph as king of Spain. When news of the uprising reached Málaga, its citizens revolted against the French invaders, with the guerrillas in the mountains putting up the fiercest resistance.

The Military Governor of Málaga province, General Theodor von Reding, held command of the First Division of the Spanish Army of Andalusia and was architect of the Spanish victory in the Battle of Bailen during the (Peninsular War). The French encountered strong resistance in Málaga and left much of the city in ruins when they withdrew. The war and revolts against Napoleon's occupation led to the adoption of the Spanish Constitution of 1812, later a cornerstone of European liberalism, by the Cortes of Cádiz. Málaga elected representatives to send to the national legislative assembly and a new constitutional Town Council which immediately implemented reconstruction plans. The French were decisively defeated at the Battle of Vitoria in 1813, and the following year, Ferdinand VII was restored as King of Spain. The burden of war had destroyed the social and economic fabric of Spain and ushered in an era of social turbulence, political instability and economic stagnation.

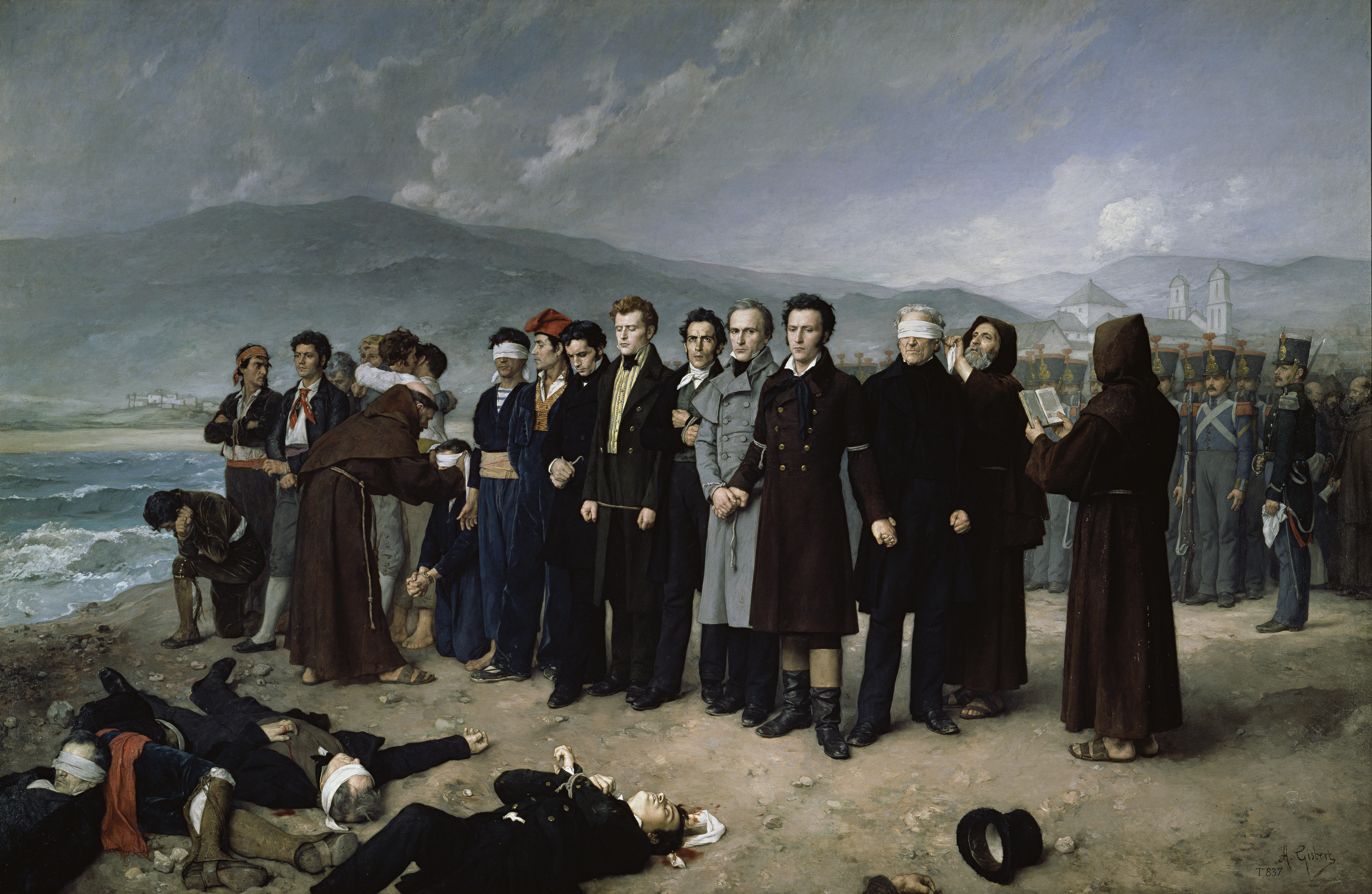
Execution of Torrijos and his men, by Antonio Gisbert

Although the juntas, which forced the French to leave Spain, had sworn by the liberal Constitution of 1812, Ferdinand openly held that it was too liberal for the country. On his return to Spain on April 16, 1814, he refused to swear by the constitution himself, and continued to rule in the authoritarian fashion of his forebears. Thus the first bourgeois revolution ended in 1814. The reign of Ferdinand VII from 1814 to 1820 was a period of a stagnant economy and political instability. Much of the country was devastated after the Peninsular War, and government coffers were drained to fight against the independence movements in the Latin American colonies. Political conflict between liberals and royal absolutists further diverted energy and resources needed to rebuild the country.

There were several attempts to install a liberal regime during the absolutist reign (1814–1820). In 1820, an expedition intended for the American colonies revolted in Cádiz. When armies throughout Spain pronounced themselves in sympathy with the revolters led by Rafael del Riego, Ferdinand was forced to relent. On 9 March 1820 he finally accepted the liberal Constitution of 1812, and appointed new ministers of state, thus ushering in the so-called Liberal Triennium (Trienio Liberal), a period of three years of liberal government and popular rule in Spain. This was the start of the second bourgeois revolution in Spain, which would last from 1820 to 1823. Once again in the revolution of 1820, it was the independent towns such as Málaga that led the drive for constitutional change in Spain. Ferdinand himself was placed under effective house arrest for the duration of the liberal experiment.

The tumultuous three years of liberal rule that followed were marked by various absolutist conspiracies. The liberal government was looked on with hostility by the Congress of Verona in 1822, and France was authorised to intervene. A French army under the command of Duke of Angoulême, invaded Spain in the so-called Spanish expedition and overwhelmed the armies of the liberal government with massive force. Ferdinand was restored as absolute monarch in 1823, marking the end of the second Spanish bourgeois revolution.

During the "Ominous Decade" (1823–1833), the name given to this period of return to the reactionary power of absolutism, the liberals suffered under a wave of repression and acts of vengeance. In 1831, the liberal general José María Torrijos, who fought against the absolutist regime of Ferdinand VII and for the restoration of the Constitution of 1812, set his field of operations in Málaga province. He and his men were captured in Alhaurin de la Torre after their betrayal by the governor of the city; they were executed by firing squad on the beach of San Andrés. Torrijos' remains are buried under the obelisk erected in his honor at the Plaza de la Merced.

As Málaga pioneered the Industrial Revolution in Spain, its educated and entrepreneurial merchant class agitated for modernity in government, making Málaga one of the most rebellious cities of the country. The bourgeoisie led several uprisings in favor of a more liberal regime to encourage free commercial enterprise. In 1834, soon after the death of Ferdinand VII, a revolt was organised against the inefficiency of the government of the Count of Toreno (Conde de Toreno), who had been appointed prime minister by the queen regent, Maria Christina on 7 June. His tenure in the premiership lasted only till 14 September. A year later the civil and military governors of Málaga, the Conde Donadio and Señor San Justo, were killed in a violent insurrection.

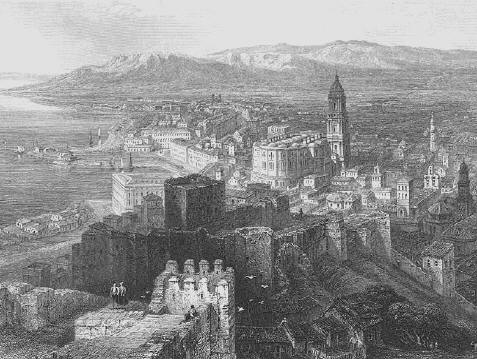
Etching of a drawing of Málaga, 1836

The Ecclesiastical Confiscations of Mendizabal in 1836 resulted in a new initiative to modernize the city. Religious convents had accumulated property since the reconquest, and by the end of the 18th century a fourth of the urban properties bounded by the ancient city walls belonged to religious orders or similar fraternal organisations. With the seizure of the church holdings, many of these buildings were demolished and new buildings or streets or squares were built to replace them. The site of the convent of San Pedro de Alcantara became the Plaza del Teatro, while the convent of San Francisco was replaced by an architecturally refined square which became the home of the Lyceum and the Philharmonic Society.

=== Economic expansion and industrialisation (1833–1868) ===
The second half of the 19th century began a period of prosperity in Málaga, with an economy energised by the resumption of traditional mercantile activities and new industrial employment. This positioned the city as an important European manufacturing centre; urban renewal projects and the modernisation of local infrastructure were initiated by local government. Manuel Agustin Heredia's ironworks, La Constancia, located in San Andrés, started a run of productivity in 1834 that made it the country's leading iron foundry.

Commerce grew significantly as the city attracted business entrepreneurs, and powerful families rose from the merchant class, some gaining influence in national politics. Notable among them were the Larios and the Lorings, the conservative politician Canovas del Castillo, the industrialist Manuel Agustin Heredia, and the Marquis of Salamanca.

From 1834 to 1843, in the period known as Spain's third bourgeois revolution, the country was ruled under the liberal government of the Progressive Party (Partido Progresista). After these years of progressivist domination, the Moderate Party (Partido Moderado) gained control. It held power continuously during the so-called Década moderada ("Moderate decade", 1843–1854) under the leadership of General Ramón María Narváez, the Duke of Valencia, using the executive office to advance its economic goals and maintain public order. The Moderates were to the right of the opposing Progressive Party, but also characterised themselves as liberal. Like the Progressives, they supported Isabel II against the claims of the Carlists.

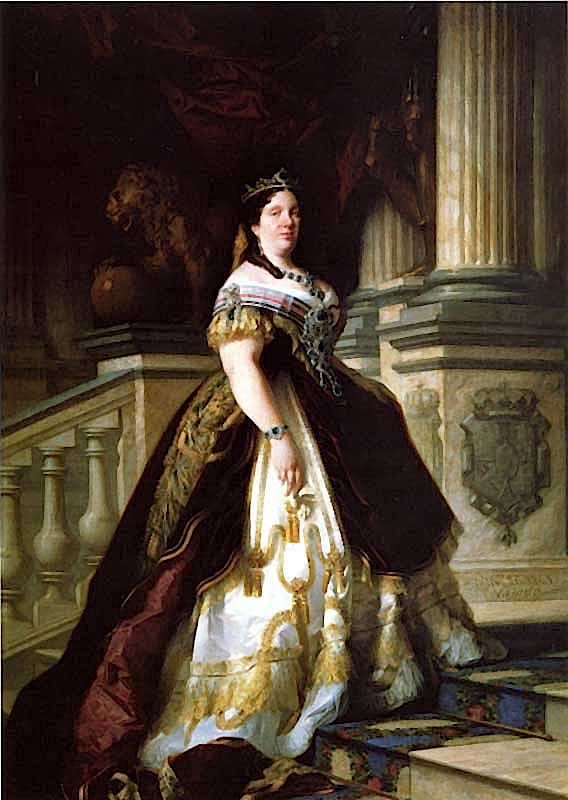
Formal portrait of Queen Isabel II of Spain

Isabella II of Spain took a more active role in government after she came of age, but she was unpopular throughout her reign. During the railway boom years of the early 1850s self-enrichment by senior Moderate politicians and members of the royal family was coming under mounting press criticism, a mood which would culminate in a fourth bourgeois revolutionary insurrection in the summer of 1854. This uprising began in the spring of 1854 as an expression of dissatisfaction on the part of the people against the government. The people were protesting the growing economic hardship under which they had been suffering. On June 28, 1854, a military coup occurred in Madrid, led by General Domingo Dulce and General Leopoldo O'Donnell. The coup overthrew the dictatorship of Luis Jose Sartorius, 1st Count of San Luis. As a result of the popular insurrection, the Progressive Party obtained widespread support in Spain and came to power in the government in 1854. The Progressives were the party of the National Militia, the jury trial, a secular state, and of national sovereignty and the broadening of the franchise under census suffrage. Although riots in December 1854 accompanied the demobilisation of Málaga's radical proletarian Militia companies, a new Progressive Town Council was elected and port and consumer levies were withdrawn, taxes that the lower classes, who supported the uprising, abhorred.

The expanding economy in all sectors required an increased money supply and capitalisation apart from that offered by the professional moneylenders. In 1859, Jorge Loring founded the private Bank of Málaga, the first to issue currency under the national Act of 1856. The bank's business was based in the booming steel and textile industries, and in commerce of the port; it operated under the control of the leading businessmen of the province.

In 1862, Queen Isabel II and her consort Francis de Assisi de Bourbon visited Málaga to mark the official opening of the Córdoba-Málaga railway, the Málaga railway station, and an exhibition of provincial agricultural and industrial products. The visit had a diplomatic purpose as well, serving as a means to repair political relations with Málaga in particular and Andalusia in general; that year there had been a bloody revolt in the Granadan town of Loja which had spread to some villages in Málaga province, with half of the detainees convicted of rebellion being Malagueños.

=== The Revolution of 1868 and First Spanish Republic (1873–1874) ===
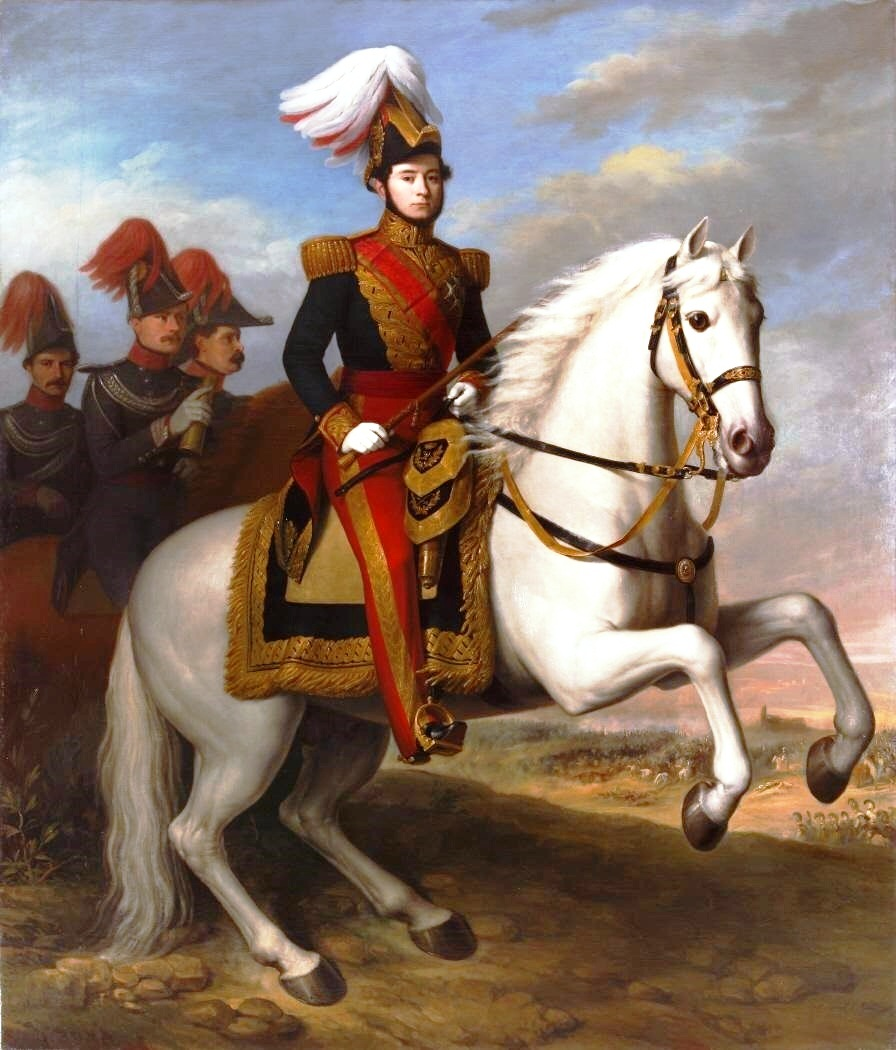
Juan Prim, general and statesman

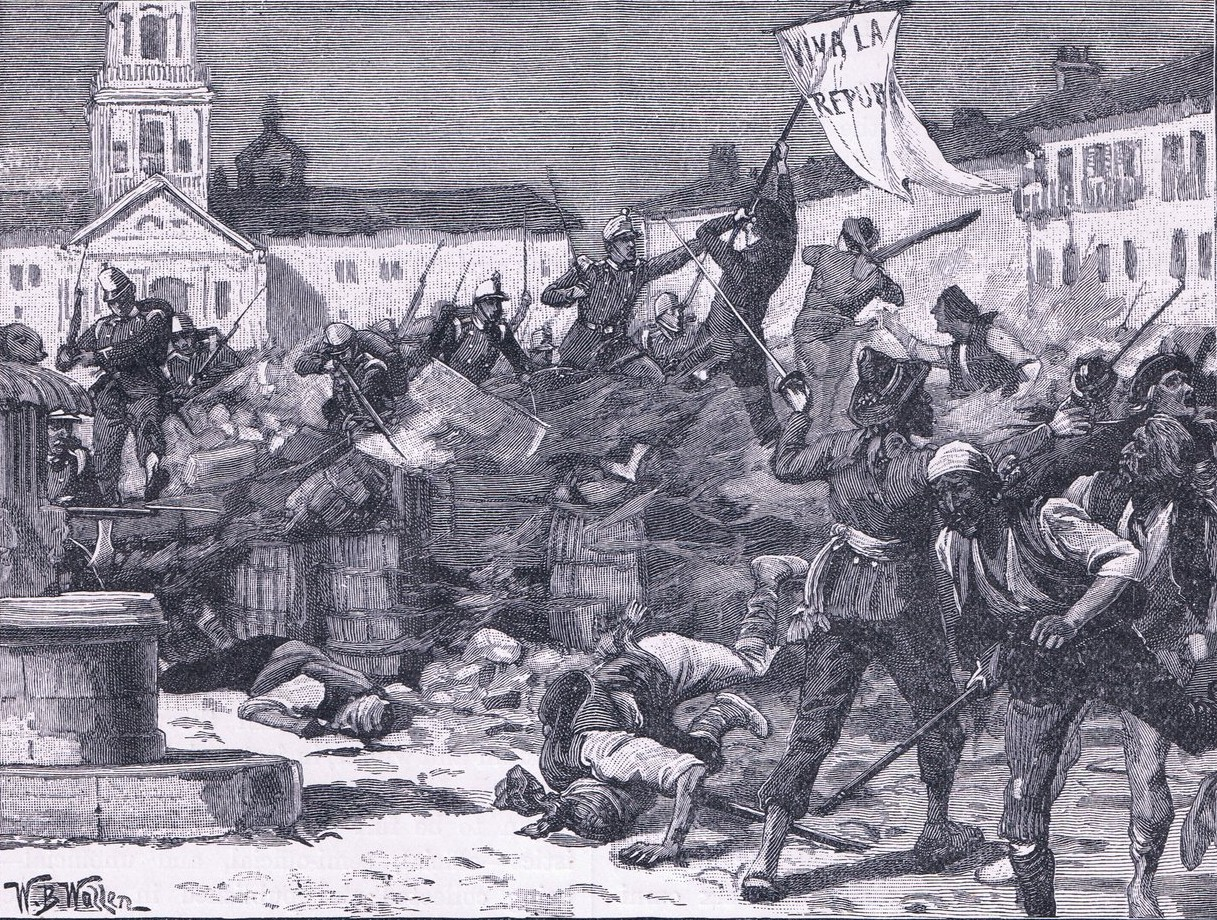
Street fighting in Malaga during the Glorious Revolution

In 1866, a revolt led by Juan Prim was suppressed, but in 1868 there was a further revolt, known as the Glorious Revolution. The progresista generals Francisco Serrano and Juan Prim revolted against Isabella and defeated her moderado generals at the Battle of Alcolea. Isabella was driven into exile in Paris, and euphoria reigned in Málaga when General Prim and the other revolutionary generals landed at the port.

However, two years of revolution and anarchy followed, until in 1870 the Cortes declared that Spain would again have a king. Amadeus of Savoy was selected, and duly crowned King of Spain early the following year. Amadeus—a liberal who swore by the liberal constitution the Cortes promulgated—was faced immediately with the impossible task of bringing the disparate political ideologies of Spain to one table.

Following the Hidalgo affair, when he had been required by the radical government to sign a decree against the artillery officers, Amadeus famously declared the people of Spain to be ungovernable, and fled the country. In his absence, a coalition of radicals, republicans, and democrats formed a government and on 11 February 1873 proclaimed the First Spanish Republic, which was immediately under siege from all quarters. The Carlists were the most immediate threat, launching a violent insurrection after their poor showing in the 1872 elections. There were calls for socialist revolution from the International Workingmen's Association and pressure from the Catholic Church against the fledgling republic.

Málaga did not recognize the new Republic until 12 February when pro-Republicans took to the streets and erected barricades. The Cantonal Revolution, a Cantonalist uprising whose goals included the redistribution of wealth and improvement of the situation of the working classes, spread locally throughout Spain in July. There were large disturbances in the city during the insurrection led by local militia leader Eduardo Carvajal; on 22 July a telegram from the civil governor, Francisco Sorlier, announced the proclamation of the Cantón Federal Malagueño Independiente. The Customs House was assaulted and many of its files and dossiers were burnt; factional clashes continued until General Manuel Pavía entered the city with his troops and ended the Cantón de Málaga on 19 September 1873.

The chaotic situation in Spain caused officers in the Spanish military to plot against the Republic and in favor of Alfonso XII, son of the exiled Isabel II. On 29 December 1874, General Martínez Campos led a coup d'état in Sagunto to restore the throne to Alfonso XII. Prime minister Sagasta's Liberal government did not object to this development, and allowed the restoration of the monarchy.

=== Restoration of Bourbon rule ===
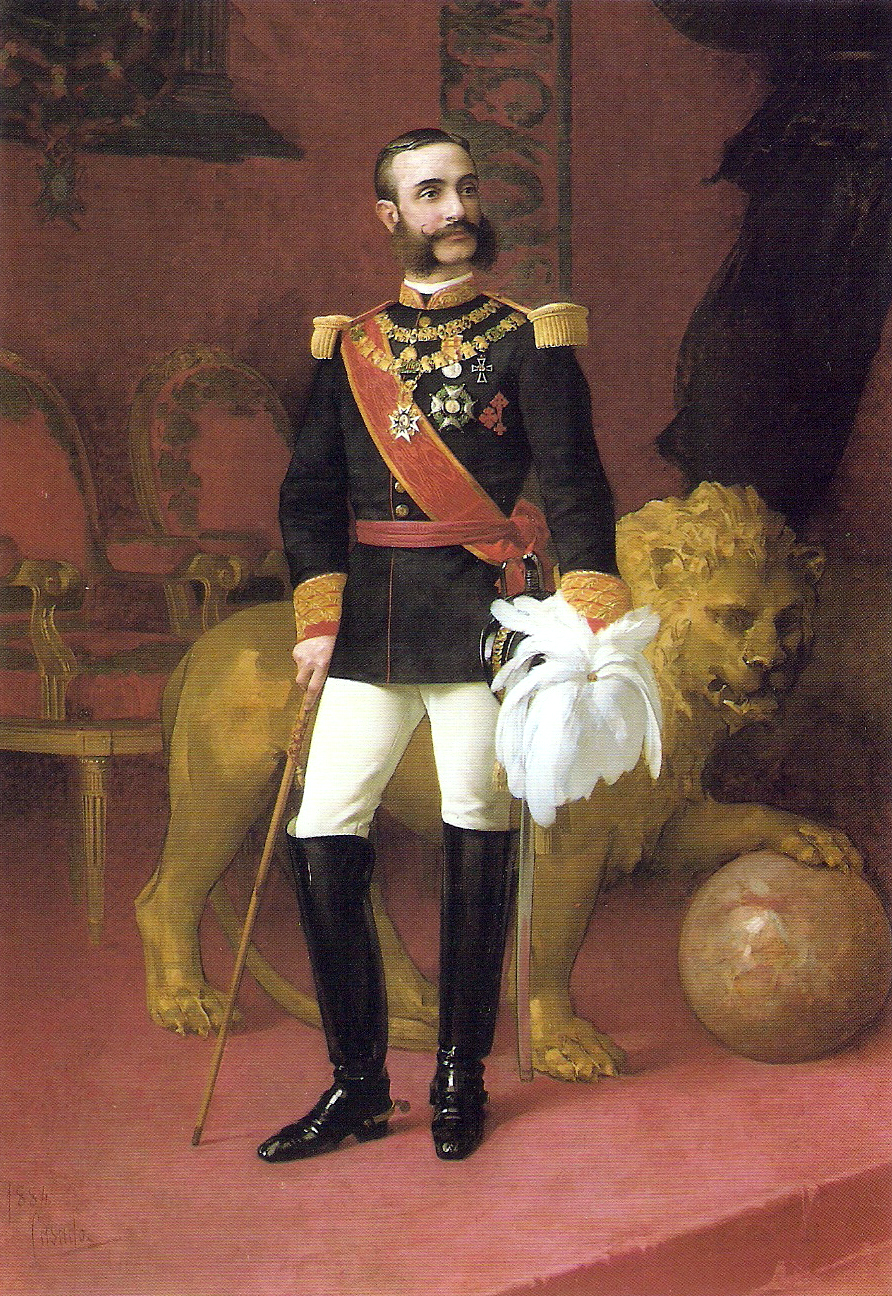
Alfonso XII

After the tumult of the First Spanish Republic, Spaniards were willing to accept a return to stability under Bourbon rule. Isabella II had abdicated in 1870 in favor of her son, Alfonso, who was now duly crowned Alfonso XII of Spain. The Republican armies in Spain—which were resisting a Carlist insurrection—pronounced their allegiance to Alfonso in the winter of 1874–1875, led by Brigadier General Martínez-Campos. The Republic was dissolved and Antonio Cánovas del Castillo, a trusted advisor to the king, was named Prime Minister on 31 December 1874. The Carlist insurrection was put down vigorously by the new king, who took an active role in the war and rapidly gained the support of most of his countrymen.

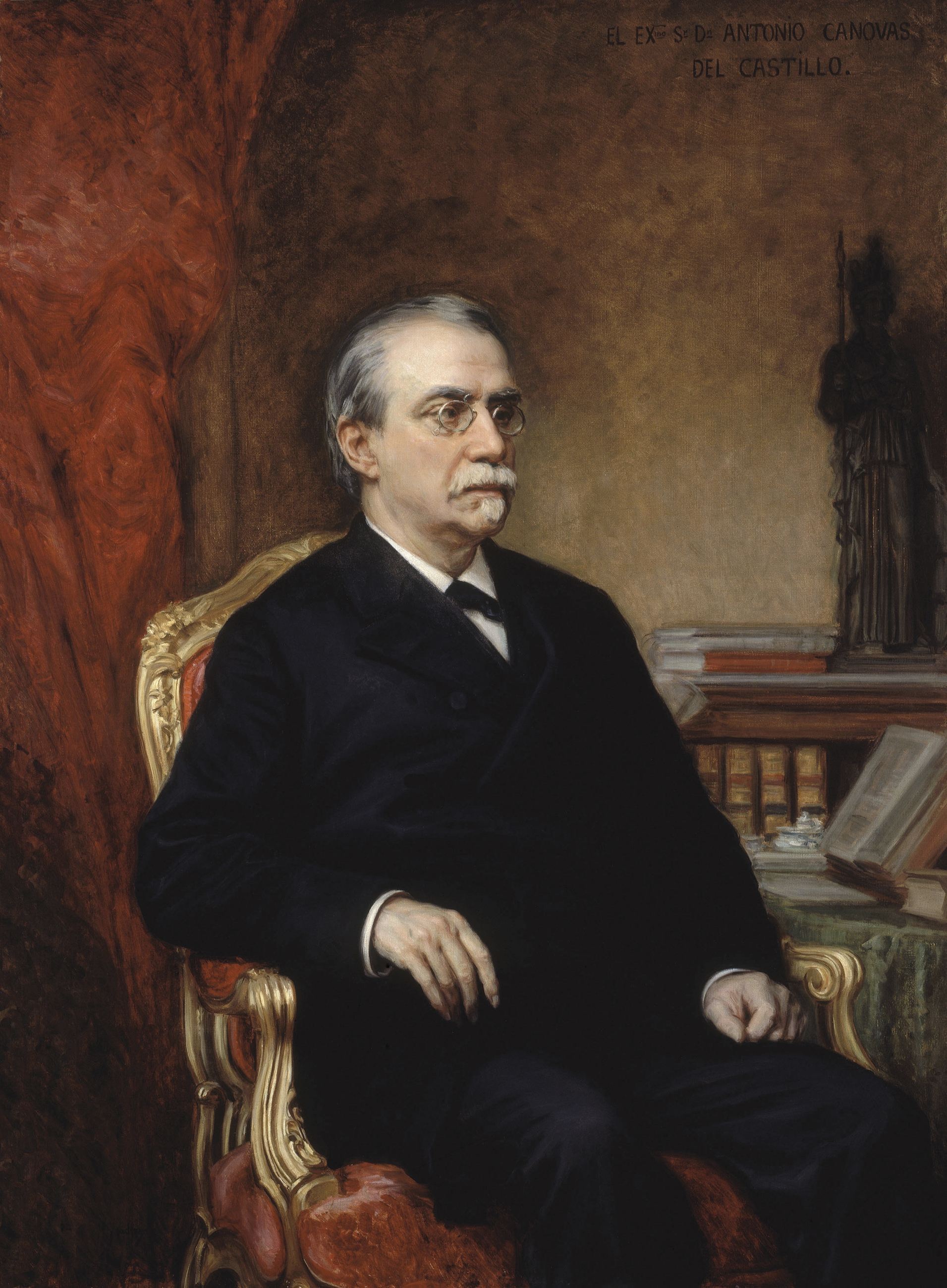
Antonio Cánovas del Castillo

A system of turnos was established in Spain in which the liberals, led by Práxedes Mateo Sagasta, and the conservatives, led by Cánovas, alternated in control of the government. A modicum of stability and economic progress was restored to Spain during Alfonso XII's rule. His death in 1885, followed by the assassination of Canovas del Castillo in 1897, destabilised the government, though constitutional monarchy continued under King Alfonso XIII.

There were social changes as well as economic ones in Málaga during the reign of Isabel II—the bourgeoisie solidified its position as an oligarchy in control of local politics, while a laboring class of industrial workers developed in the factories. The presence of these large factories resulted in the growth of an industrial and workers' suburb on the banks of the Guadalmedina river, separate from the residential areas of the bourgeoisie in the center and the eastern part of the city. The city's population continued to grow, creating a need for the expansion of civil infrastructure.

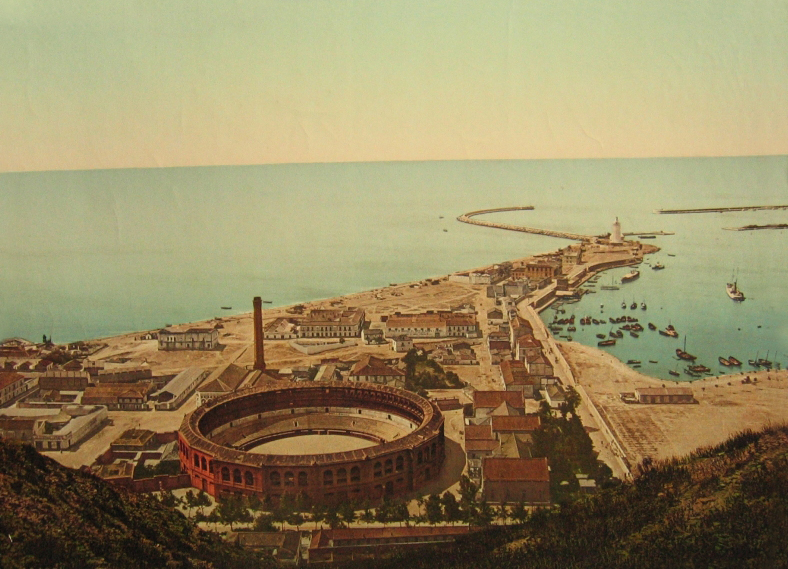
Málaga's bullring, Plaza de toros de La Malagueta

The monasteries were not only religious centers but also places where Málaga's cultural heritage was preserved and even, occasionally, where political power was exercised. Their spatial distribution affected the development of the city outside the medieval center: on the western edge the urban landscape began to take shape under the influence of industrial activity, while at the eastern end villas and hotels began to appear. With the seizure and subsequent demolition of old church buildings, the city gained new opportunities for growth.

Communications were improved in the province with the construction of new railway lines to transport raw supplies and industrial products. Jorge Loring and Joaquin de la Gandara acquired numerous small rail lines and unified their interests in 1877 to found the Andalusian Railway Company (Compañía de los Ferrocarriles Andaluces), which owned most of the rails in Andalusia. This consolidation and expansion helped create a common regional market for trade goods.

Málaga had substantial economic development in the first half of the 19th century, and by 1850 it ranked second in industrial production among the provinces of Spain, after Barcelona. The textile and steel industries generated a number of ancillary industries, including factories for soap, paint, and salt fish; breweries; timber mills; potteries; brickworks; and tanneries. Their production necessitated the building of a rail network between Córdoba and Málaga, which was connected with the national network on 15 August 1865. The city acquired public gas lighting on 6 July 1852, the Gas Lebón Company supplying the city with gas until 1897, when electrification was introduced. A public tram service with horse-drawn carriages began on 19 November 1881; in January 1901, electric power replaced the horses.

In 1880 the city council formed a corporation to promote the construction of the Calle Marqués de Larios, in honor of the textile industrialist and financier Manuel Domingo Larios, The project was capitalised to one million pesetas by selling shares distributed in lots of forty shares of 25,000 pesetas each, most of them acquired by the Larios family. The plans were drawn and the works directed by architect Eduardo Strachan; the grand street opened in 1890. This was the beginning of the modernisation of the city envisioned by Theodor von Reding and executed by the architects Manuel Rivera Vera, Jerónimo Cuervo and Fernando Guerrero Strachan.

The rise of dissident workers' organisations and the increase of labor conflict with the oligarchy reflected social tensions at the end of the century. The origins of the socialist unions in Málaga date to a workers' athenaeum founded in 1884 by Rafael Salinas Sánchez, known popularly as the "apostle" of socialism. Sánchez was born on 21 June 1850 to a working-class family in the El Perchel barrio. His childhood family life was marked by the typical hardships of the working classes of the 19th century. As a young man he became an active member of the workers' unions, notably the International Association of Workers, and was forced into exile in 1874 for two years in Cuba during the Restoration. In 1884 he founded, with Antonio Valenzuela, the Agrupación Socialista de Málaga. That the socialist cause was taking hold in the provincial capital was evidenced by the more than 2,000 attendees at a rally in 1890 at the Café El Turco.

While running as a candidate for Parliament in 1891, Salinas organised local chapters in eastern Andalusia of the Unión General de Trabajadores (UGT), or General Union of Workers, which held its Third National Congress in Málaga in 1892. They produced plans to assuage the working conditions of workers in the Larios' textile factory, but Salinas was jailed for his support of the workers and harassed by the authorities. The Partido Socialista Obrero Español (PSOE), or Spanish Socialist Workers' Party, and the UGT were repressed throughout the province in the following years, which saw frequent clashes between workers and employers.

=== Economic crisis of 1893 and decline at the end of the century ===
The end of the economic boom in 19th century Málaga started in 1880 when the high cost of importing coal for steel production made its foundries less competitive with those of the industrial complexes in northern Spain. The economic crisis of 1893 finally forced the closing of the La Constancia iron foundry and was accompanied by the collapse of the sugar industry and the spread of the phylloxera blight, which devastated the vineyards of the province. The abandonment of farms and consequent neglect of the terraces where the vineyards were cultivated resulted in gradual deforestation of the slopes, causing increased flooding after heavy rains, with severe erosion in the beds of the streams and rivers of virtually the entire coastal area. The more vulnerable sections of society were hardest hit by the repercussions of the economic crisis, especially farm laborers and small landholders in the rural areas, along with industrial workers and artisans in the urban areas. Tens of thousands of Malagueños emigrated overseas in search of better opportunities.

The social disruption caused by the crisis and its aftermath of job loss, business collapse and general decline in economic activity, led many residents to consider other means of livelihood. Even at this early date some of them envisaged tourism as an alternative source of income, but years passed before initiatives were put forward to develop Málaga as a tourist resort. The Sociedad Propagandística del Clima y Embellecimiento de Málaga (Propagation Society for the Climate and Beautification of Málaga) was founded in 1897 by a pioneering group of influential Málaga businessmen who saw the potential of tourism as a generator of wealth, and tried to organize a rational planned development of this sector of the economy. Their promotional campaigns extolled the mild climate of Málaga, attracting enough tourists and winter visitors to help relieve the economic slump.

== Twentieth century ==
The economic depression that gripped Málaga at the end of the 19th century continued during the first few years of the 20th century. Caciquism, government by local political bosses, prevailed in Andalusia. Monarchist parties dominated the political environment by turns, nevertheless the recession worsened. The depressed economy, social conflict and a government dominated by political patronage made oligarchy and caciqueism the distinguishing political features of a province lagging in its development as the 1900s began. In this context, bourgeois republicanism and the labor movements found new support.

The beginning of the 20th century was a time of readjustment and contrast in Málaga with the expansion and improvement of agriculture, which had become the dominant economic sector. There was a progressive dismantling of industry accompanied by fluctuating commercial activity. All this occurred within a backward and barely literate society, where oligarchs exercised political control and manipulated the economy. Primary education in the city was plagued by funding deficits and a lack of schools and places for students and teachers, while secondary education was limited and university education nonexistent. Málaga faced the new century in the midst of an economic depression with the attendant social unrest and a weak structure of the state; meanwhile the republicans and the labor movement found common ground.

The city's commercial activity, though still significant, lacked the vigor that had characterised the economy throughout most of the 19th century. Infrastructure was improved with the inauguration of a tram line, the entry into service of the Suburban Railway (Ferrocarriles Suburbanos de Málaga) with two commuter lines, and the opening of a hydroelectric plant in El Chorro. In 1919 the Málaga Airport was created as a stop on the passage route (Toulouse – Barcelona – Alicante – Málaga – Casablanca) of the first airline established in Spain.

=== Málaga during World War I (1914–1918) ===
Spain's neutrality in World War I allowed it to become a supplier of material for both sides to its great advantage. The export of raw agricultural products, minerals, textiles and steel prompted an economic boom; subsequently the surplus balance of trade grew to over five hundred million pesetas. The extraordinary growth in business profits favored industrial oligarchs and the merchant middle class, but increases in wages for workers did not keep pace with inflation—overall standards of living for the masses actually decreased. The urban industrial proletariat, meanwhile, kept up continuous pressure for wage increases.

"The 1917 Crisis" (Crisis de 1917) is the name given by Spanish historians to events of the summer of 1917 in Spain, primarily three simultaneous movements that challenged the government: a military movement (the Juntas), a political movement (the Parliamentary Assembly of Catalanist and Spanish Republican deputies in Barcelona), and a social movement (the revolutionary general strike).

Spain's economy suffered upon the decline of the wartime economic activity. Following the end of the war, the fall in foreign demand depressed the agricultural, industrial and trade markets. With the loss of these, protective measures were demanded by workers as the downward pressure of prices on salaries intensified. Employers argued that the solution was to reduce product costs, lower labor costs and increase productivity, but the workers refused to accept their propositions.

Factories closed, unemployment soared and wages declined. Expecting class conflict, especially in light of the recent Russian Revolution, much of the capitalist class began a bitter war against the unions, particularly the CNT or Confederación Nacional del Trabajo (National Confederation of Labor). Lockouts became more frequent. Known militants were blacklisted. Pistoleros, or assassins, were hired to kill union leaders. Scores, perhaps hundreds, of anarchists were murdered during this period. Anarchists responded in turn with a number of assassinations, the most famous of which is the murder of Prime Minister Eduardo Dato Iradier.

The pandemic outbreak of influenza in the spring of 1918, along with a major economic slowdown in the postwar period, hit Spain particularly hard, and the country went into debt. From that moment the social conflict was to come to a head. The post-World War I economic difficulties heightened social unrest among urban industrial workers and rural peasants, with a period of strikes and agitation in both the city and the countryside. The Cortes (Spanish parliament) under the constitutional monarchy seemed to have no solution to Spain's unemployment, labor strikes, and poverty. The socialists and anarchists pressed for radical changes, but the government proved unable to reform itself or the nation and frustration mounted.

The various socialist factions had consolidated their organisations and from 1909 had become more influential in Málaga, while anarchism was gaining popular support. "The Bolshevik triennium" (1918–1920) saw a major outbreak of strikes and land occupations, triggered by news of the Russian Revolution and deteriorating economic conditions in the countryside. This was a time of conflict for the workers' movements in Andalusia and one of reorganisation for those in Málaga. In 1919 Málaga and Seville provinces had the greatest CNT presence, and Málaga was the Andalusian city with the most local affiliates. The general elections of 1 June 1919 resulted in the Conservative Party winning 198 seats in the Cortes Generales, revealing the weakness of the republican parties.

=== Dictatorship of Primo de Rivera (1923–1930) ===
On 13 September 1923, General Miguel Primo de Rivera, at the time Captain General of Barcelona, led a military revolt against the parliamentary government, and established himself as dictator. He proposed to keep the dictatorship in place long enough to clean up the mess created by the politicians, and in the meantime, he would use the state to modernise the economy and alleviate the problems of the working class.

Primo de Rivera set his economic planners to building infrastructure for the country. Hydroelectric dams were constructed to provide water for irrigation and to bring electricity to some of Spain's rural regions. Spain had few cars when he came to power; by 1930, it possessed a network of automobile roads. His regime upgraded the country's railroads, helping the Spanish iron and steel industry to recover. Public works carried out in Málaga included the planning and creation of the Ciudad Jardín district and construction of the Gaitanejo reservoir (accomplished with private financing) in El Chorro.

Between 1923 and 1927, foreign trade increased three hundred per cent, although the government intervened to protect national producers from foreign competition. Primo de Rivera enjoyed some success in improving relations with the labor unions and in public works projects, but failed to win the support of the middle classes. His allegiance to the land-holding class prevented fundamental agrarian reforms, and he repressed human rights in Catalonia.

The census for this period shows lower population densities in Málaga province due to high levels of emigration, mostly to the Americas. With the fragmentation of the monarchist parties, the republicans regrouped and the socialist workers movements grew stronger. Even in an era of repression of basic civil rights and little cultural development, an intellectual movement to cultivate the fine arts, the humanities and science arose in the tertulias of Málaga. This would profoundly influence the evolution of cultural pursuits in the city.

In 1925 the poets Emilio Prados (1899–1962) and Manuel Altolaguirre (1905–1959) became editors for the Sur printing house in Málaga. Sur was responsible for publishing most of the work of the Generation of '27, and the quality of their editing brought Prados and Altolaguirre international prestige. In 1926 they founded the magazine Litoral, one of the most influential literary and artistic publications of 1920s Spain. Federico García Lorca's Canciones, published in 1927 as the first supplement of the "little magazine" Litoral, was a high-water mark of the initial phase in his poetic output.

The writers and intellectuals of Málaga congregated at the Café de Chinitas (Café of the Chinese, 1857–1937), the famous cabaret immortalised by Federico García Lorca, where the best flamenco singers performed in the 1920s.

=== Málaga between the dictatorship and the republic (1930–1931) ===
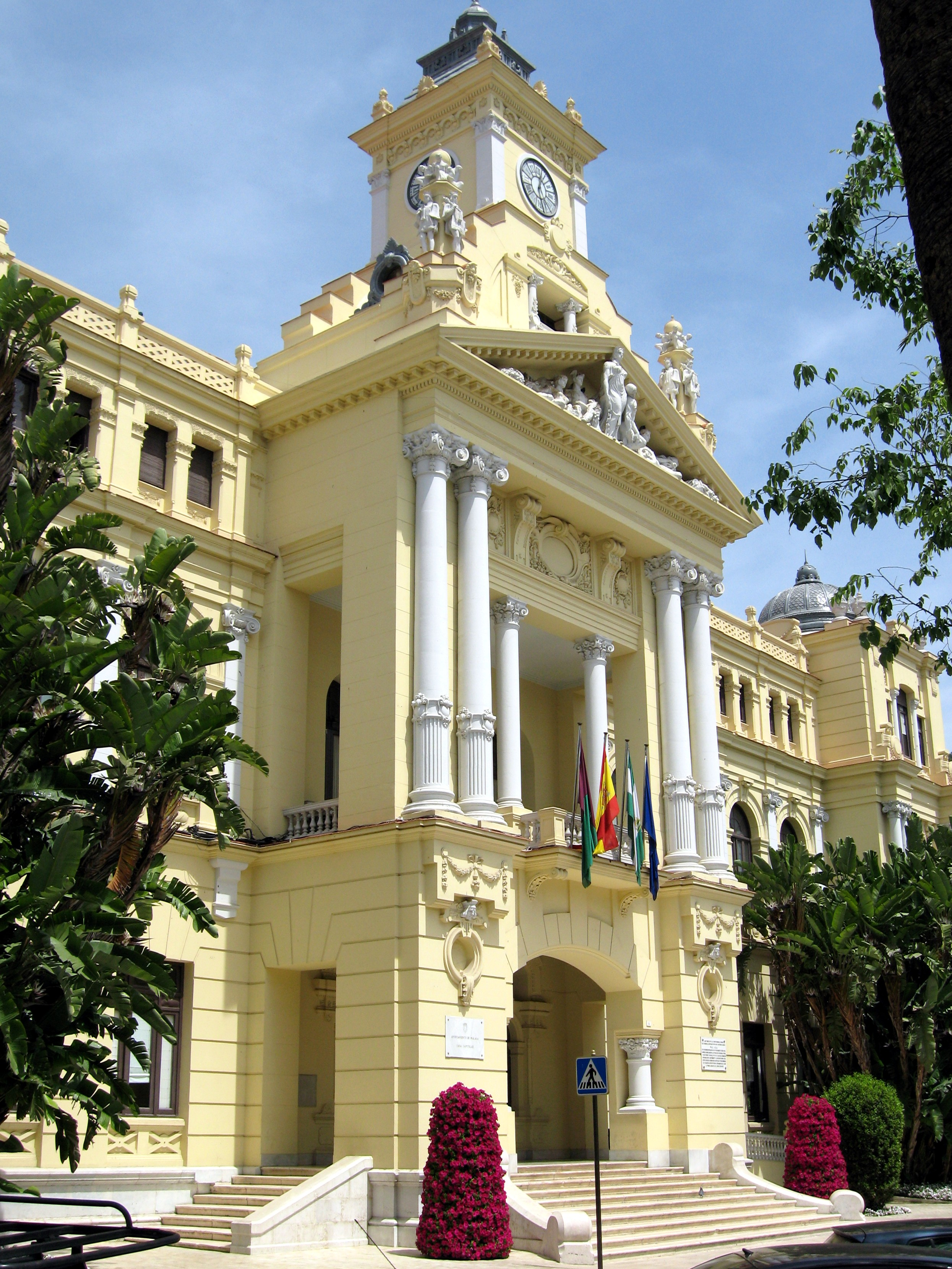
Málaga City Hall (Ayuntamiento)

The economic boom ended as Spaniards became increasingly disenchanted with the dictatorship. Conservative critics blamed rising inflation on the government's spending for public works projects. Then 1929 brought a bad agricultural harvest and Spain's imports far outstripped the worth of its exports. The economic slump after the Wall Street crash decimated foreign trade and once again the old problems returned to Spain's internal politics and economy. Dissatisfaction spread throughout society, and when King Alfonso and the army, his main source of power, no longer backed him, Primo de Rivera resigned on 26 January 1930. He retired to Paris and died from fever and diabetes on 16 March.

The political atmosphere in Málaga was contentious in the period between the fall of the dictatorship and the national elections in April 1931. For the republicans in Málaga it was a period of reorganisation, assimilation with other groups, and political activity in cooperation with the socialists. At the same time, the divergent agendas of Málaga's monarchist factions were an obstacle to finding a candidate to represent their interests. Meanwhile, the anarchist CNT and the Communist Party (PCE) organised social protests and strikes against the difficult conditions suffered by the working class.

National bankruptcy and massive unpopularity had left the king no option but to demand Primo de Rivera's resignation. Disgusted with the king's involvement in his dictatorship, the urban population voted for the republican parties in the municipal elections of April 1931. The king fled the country without abdicating and a republic was established.

=== Second Spanish Republic ===
After the proclamation of the Second Spanish Republic on 14 April, the year 1931 saw the burning of convents, churches and religious buildings by crowds rioting throughout Spain, an event known as la quema de conventos (the burning of the convents). When news of the events in Madrid on 11 May reached Málaga, uncontrolled mobs took to the streets that night and assaulted the Jesuits' residence and the Episcopal Palace. The mayhem lasted overnight and all the next day.

Málaga was the Spanish city most affected by the quema—much of its religious, artistic, cultural and historical heritage was destroyed. It suffered not only the partial or complete destruction of many buildings, but also the loss of priceless historical records, religious images, ancient paintings, and libraries. Among the many works burnt were religious sculptures, including two masterpieces of Spanish baroque art by the sculptor Pedro de Mena as well as images carved by Fernando Ortiz. According to the historian Antonio Garcia Sanchez, the historical precedents of the burning of the convents may be found in the adoption of vehement anti-clerical positions by the workers' political parties prior to the proclamation of the Second Spanish Republic.

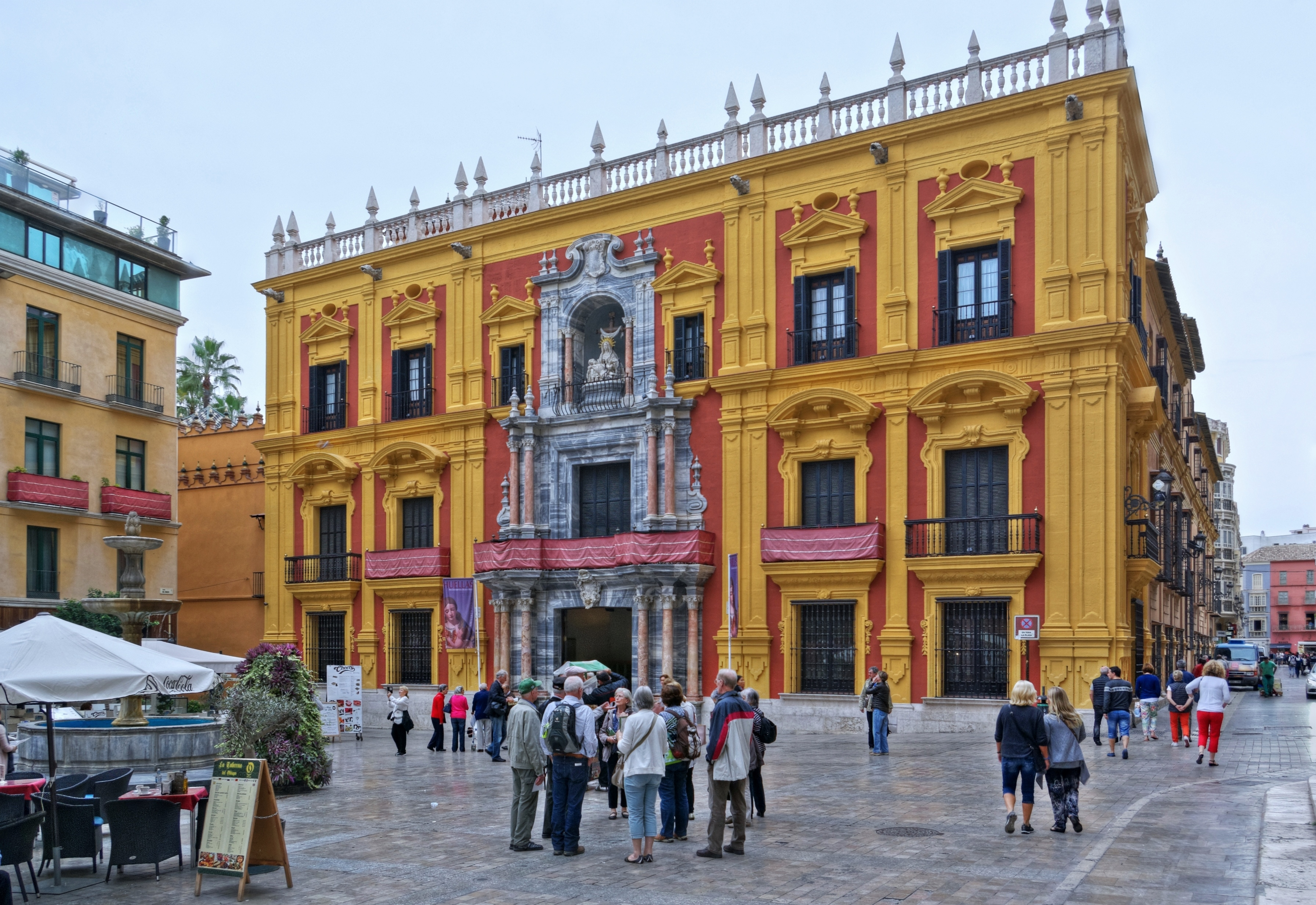
The Episcopal Palace

In 1933, Málaga elected the first deputy of the Communist Party of Spain to become a member of Congress, Cayetano Bolivar. With its large number of active socialist, anarchist, and communist militants, Málaga became known as "Red Málaga", although Catholics, liberals and conservatives were still represented in local politics.

== Cedistas and the Popular Front (1934–1936) ==
Spanish politics was polarized to the left and the right throughout the 1930s. The left-wing favored class struggle, land reform, autonomy to the regions and reduction in church and monarchist power. The right-wing groups, the largest of which was the Spanish Confederation of the Autonomous Right (CEDA), a right wing Roman Catholic coalition, held opposing views on most issues. The first two governments of the Republic were center-left. Economic turmoil, substantial debt inherited from the Primo de Rivera regime, and fractious, rapidly changing governing coalitions led to serious political unrest. In 1933, CEDA won the national elections; an armed uprising of workers in October 1934 was forcefully put down by the new government. This in turn energised political movements across the spectrum in Spain, including a revived anarchist movement and new reactionary and fascist groups, including the Falange and a revived Carlist movement. The left united in the Popular Front and won the electoral vote in February 1936, reversing the right-wing trend.

However, this coalition, dominated by the center-left, was undermined both by the revolutionary groups such as the anarchist Confederación Nacional del Trabajo (CNT) and Federación Anarquista Ibérica (FAI) and by anti-democratic far-right groups such as the Falange and the Carlists. The political violence of previous years started again. There were gunfights over strikes, landless laborers seized land, church officials were killed and churches burnt. On the other side, right wing militias such as the Falange and gunmen hired by employers assassinated left wing activists. The Republican democracy never developed the consensus or mutual trust between the various political groups that it needed to function peacefully. The right wing of the country and high-ranking figures in the army began to plan a coup, and as a result the country slid into civil war. The Spanish Civil War began after a pronunciamiento (declaration of opposition) by the generals under the leadership of José Sanjurjo against the elected government of President Manuel Azaña. The rebel coup was supported by a number of conservative groups including CEDA, the religious monarchist Carlists, and the Fascist Falange.

== Spanish Civil War (1936–1939) ==
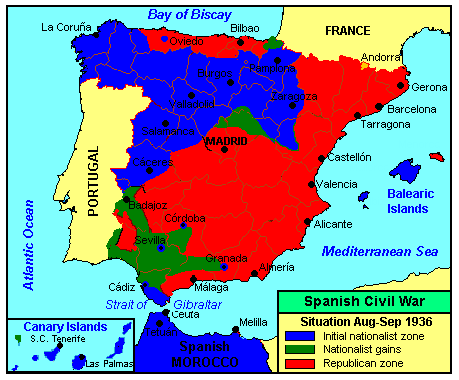
Spanish Civil War, August–September 1936

On 17 July 1936, General Francisco Franco led the colonial army from Morocco to attack the mainland, while another force from the north under General Sanjurjo moved south from Navarre. Military units were also mobilised elsewhere to take over government institutions. Franco's move was intended to seize power immediately, but successful resistance by Republicans around the country meant that Spain faced a prolonged civil war. Soon much of the south and west was under the control of the Nationalists, whose regular Army of Africa was the most seasoned of all the forces.

The Siege of the Alcázar at Toledo early in the war was a turning point, with the Nationalists winning after a long siege. The Republicans managed to hold out in Madrid, despite a Nationalist assault in November 1936.

The Battle of Málaga was the culmination of an offensive in February 1937 by the combined Nationalist and Italian forces under the command of General Queipo de Llano to eliminate Republican control of the province of Málaga. The participation of Moroccan regulars and Italian tanks from the recently arrived Corpo Truppe Volontarie resulted in a complete rout of the Spanish Republican Army and the capitulation of Málaga in less than a week on 8 February. The occupation of Málaga led to an exodus of civilians and soldiers on the road to Almería, who were bombarded by Franco's air force, navy cruisers, tanks and artillery on 8 February, causing hundreds of deaths. This episode is known as the "Málaga-Almería road massacre".

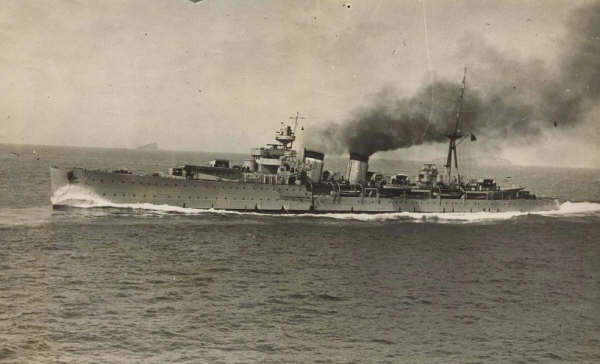
The Spanish cruiser Almirante Cervera participated in the shelling of the Málaga littoral

The Nationalists began to further erode the Republican territory, starving Madrid and making inroads into the east. The north, including the Basque country fell in late 1937 and the Aragon front collapsed shortly afterwards. The Battle of the Ebro in July–November 1938 was the final desperate attempt by the Republicans to turn the tide. When this failed and Barcelona fell to the Nationalists in early 1939, it was clear the war was over. The remaining Republican fronts collapsed and Madrid fell in March 1939.

The war, which cost between 300,000 and 1,000,000 lives, ended with the destruction of the Republic and the accession of Francisco Franco as dictator of Spain. Franco amalgamated all the right wing parties into a reconstituted Falange and banned the left-wing and Republican parties and trade unions. The conduct of the war was brutal on both sides, with massacres of civilians and prisoners being widespread. After the war, many thousands of Republicans were imprisoned and up to 151,000 were executed between 1939 and 1943.

== Málaga during the dictatorship of Francisco Franco (1936–1975) ==
During Franco's rule, Spain was officially neutral in World War II and remained largely economically and culturally isolated from the outside world. Under a right-wing military dictatorship, Spain saw its political parties banned, except for the official party, the Falange. The formation of labor unions and all dissident political activity was forbidden.

Under Franco, Spain actively sought the return of Gibraltar by the UK, and gained some support for its cause at the United Nations. During the 1960s, Spain began imposing restrictions on Gibraltar, culminating in the closure of the border in 1969. It was not fully reopened until 1985.

Spanish rule in Morocco ended in 1967. Though militarily victorious in the 1957–1958 Moroccan invasion of Spanish West Africa, Spain gradually relinquished its remaining African colonies. Spanish Guinea was granted independence as Equatorial Guinea in 1968, while the Moroccan enclave of Ifni was ceded to Morocco in 1969.

The latter years of Franco's rule saw some economic and political liberalization, known as the Spanish Miracle, including the birth of a tourism industry. Spain began to catch up economically with its European neighbors.

Franco ruled until his death on 20 November 1975, when control was given to King Juan Carlos. In the last few months before Franco's death, the Spanish state went into a paralysis. This was capitalised upon by King Hassan II of Morocco, who ordered the 'Green March' into Western Sahara, Spain's last colonial possession."

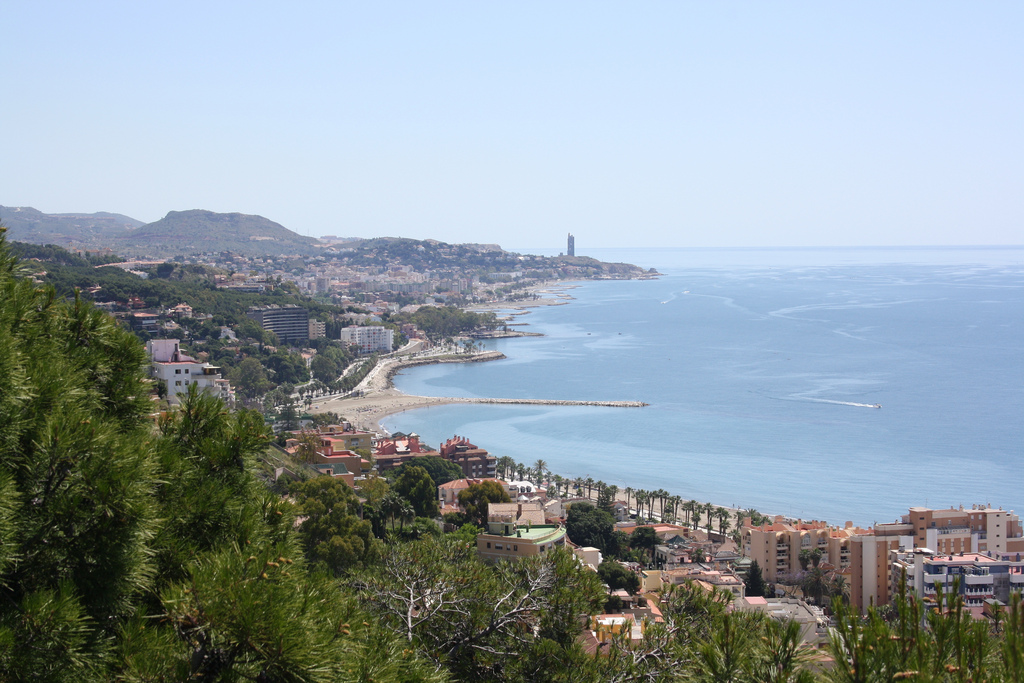
Málaga's coast

Málaga experienced an explosive demographic and economic expansion with the boom in tourism on the Costa del Sol between 1959 and 1974. The name "Costa del Sol" was created specifically to market the Mediterranean coastline of Málaga province to foreign vacationers. Historically the provincial population had lived in the fishing villages, and in the "white" villages (pueblos blancos) a short distance inland in the mountains running down to the coast. The area was developed to meet the demands of international tourism in the 1950s and has since been a popular destination for foreign tourists not only for its beaches but also for its local culture. There was significant migration from many towns around the province to the capital and a simultaneous migration of part of the population from Málaga to northern Spain and other European countries.

The "Spanish miracle" fed itself on the rural exodus which created a new class of industrial workers. The economic boom led to an increase in rapid, largely unplanned building on the periphery of the cities of the Costa del Sol to accommodate the new workers arriving from the countryside. Some cities preserved their historic centers, but most were altered by often haphazard commercial and residential developments. The same fate befell long stretches of scenic coastline as mass tourism exploded.

The University of Málaga (UMA, Universidad de Málaga) was founded by governmental decree on 18 August 1972, consolidating the existing centers of higher education: the Polytechnic University of Málaga (Escuela Universitaria Politécnica), the Normal School, the Faculty of Economics and the Seminary, which offered instruction in philosophy and theology. The Faculty of Medicine was created after ratification of the decree.

Teatinos Campus, located in the Teatinos-Universidad district, is the largest UMA campus and is home to most of the university academic buildings including the Schools of Engineering, the Faculty of Medicine, the Faculty of Science, the College of Philosophy and Letters, the Faculty of Psychology and the Faculty of Law; the General Library is also located there. Currently the campus is expanding by more than 1000 m^{2} to accommodate the faculties still in El Ejido.

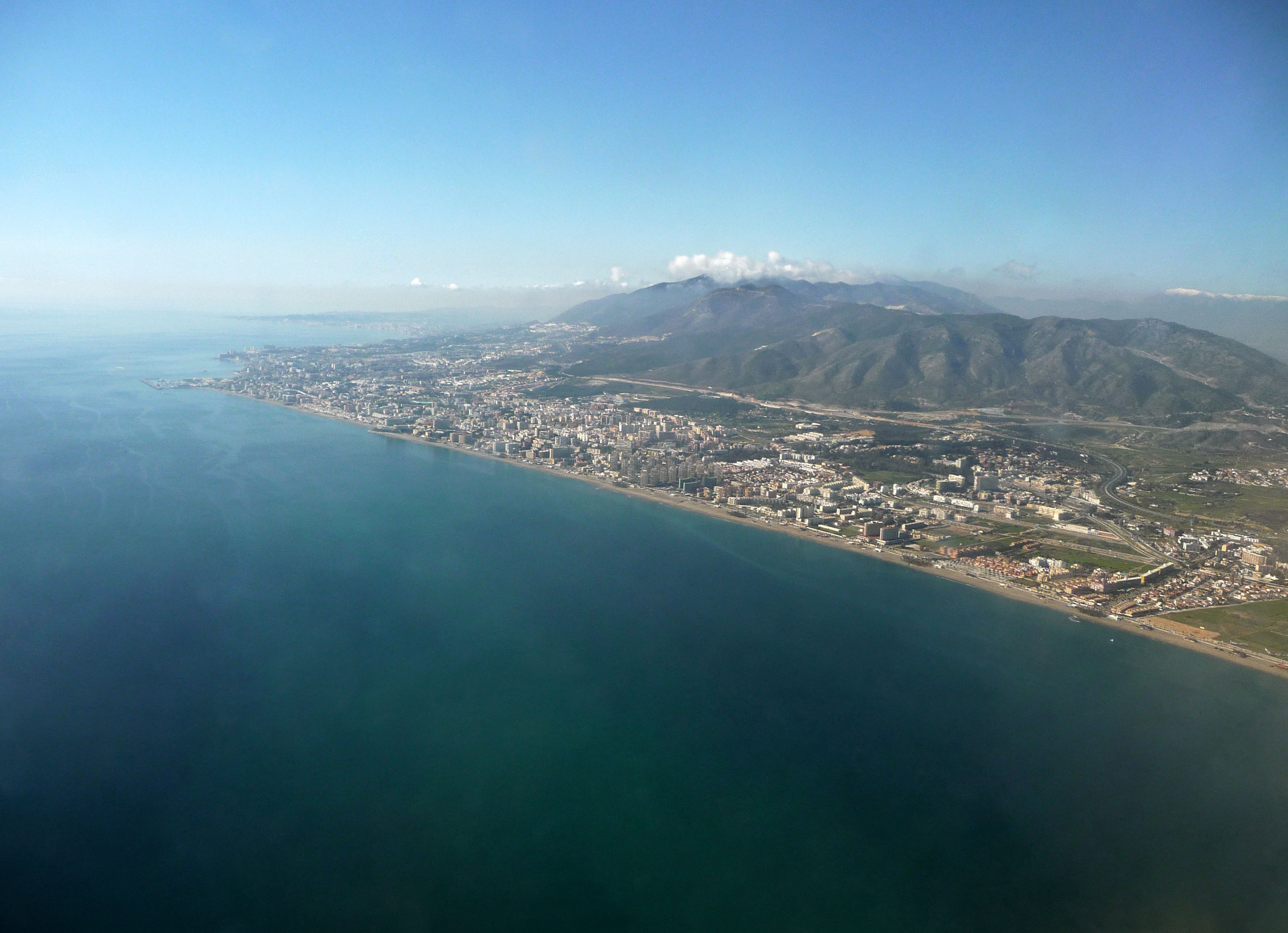
Torremolinos by air

On 27 September 1988, the Andalusian Parliament (Junta de Andalucía) unilaterally approved the separation of the suburb of Torremolinos and its incorporation as its own municipality, depriving the city of Málaga of ten percent of its population. The decision, regarded as illegal by many Malagueños, dispensed with the requirement of an uninterrupted separation of at least ten kilometers from another village (although currently the limit is set to 7.5 kilometers). Nevertheless, it was hailed as setting an historic precedent: although it did not take into account popular opinion in the rest of Málaga, it did respond to the wishes of thousands of the residents of Torremolinos who, although mostly non-natives, demanded municipal autonomy. In any case, the city of Málaga, in addition to the loss of the aforementioned population (estimated at the time at about 50,000 people), lost six per cent of its tax revenue and five per cent of its expenses.

The (PTA, Parque Tecnológico de Andalucía) opened in 1992.

== 21st century ==
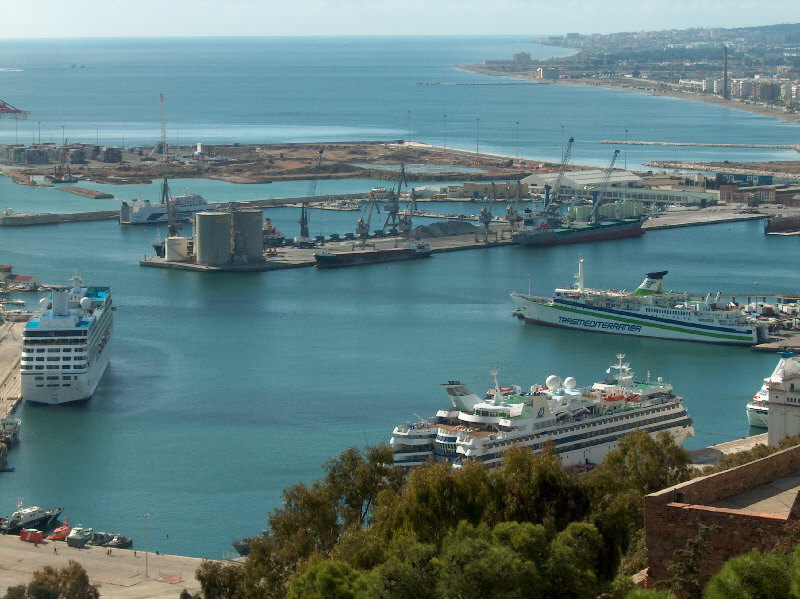
The Port of Málaga

The Metro in Málaga began with proposals in the late '90s to create a light rail network to relieve the problem of traffic congestion in the city. In 2001, the Ministry of Public Works and Transport commissioned a study based on suggestions in the Intermodal Transport Plan, which had initially proposed four lines. The first two lines are still under construction as of 2012.

Since 1998 the Port of Málaga has been undergoing renovation and expansion as part of the project called the Plan Especial del Puerto de Málaga. There are major projects underway or planned to radically change the image of the port and surrounding areas. The total traffic of goods imported or exported was 2,316,780 metric tonnes in 2015.

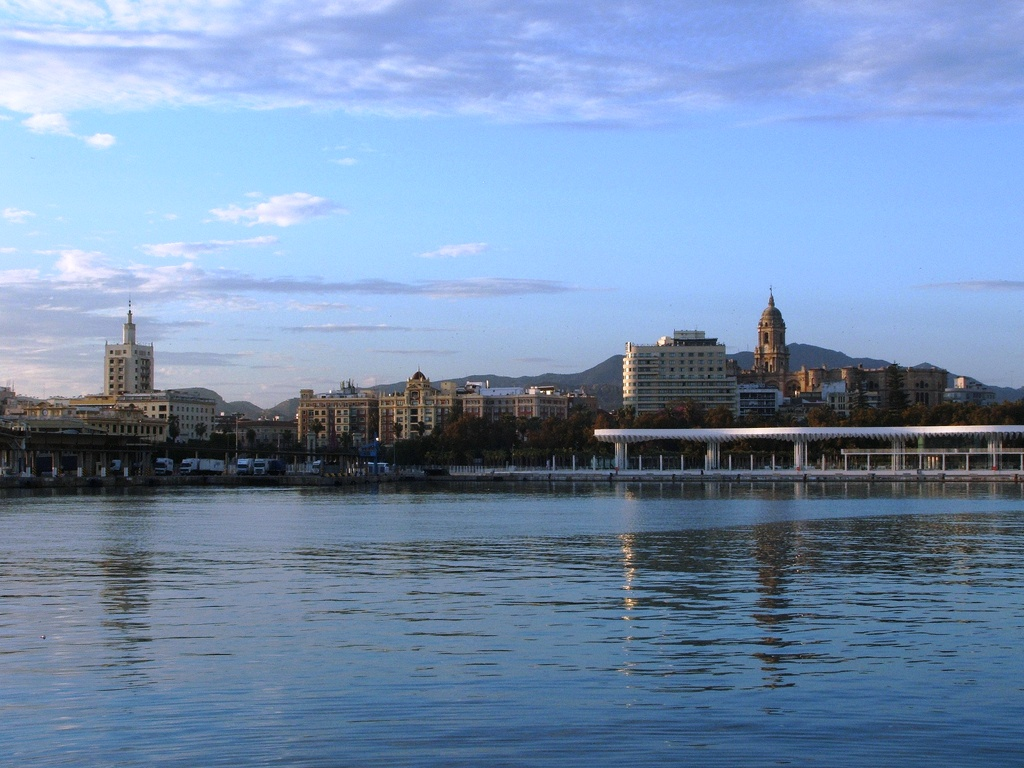
View of Málaga from the port

Cruise shipping has become an essential industry at the port and a major driver of investment in Málaga. In 2012 there were 651,517 passengers visiting the city onboard cruise ships calling at the port, including those who started or ended their cruise in Málaga. Meanwhile, the regular line of coast trade between Málaga and Melilla moved around 303,369 passengers, for a total of approximately 942,214 passengers traveling to, from or through the port. The development of the cruise industry is proceeding with a new passenger terminal, port museum and environmental education center planned for inclusion in the cruise ship facilities at Quay 2. A commercial marina will also operate from Quay 1, catering to 24 super-yachts of up to 30 meters, and the Eastern Quay passenger terminal will be remodeled to improve pedestrian access and double existing capacity to 560,000 passengers a year. The quays are connected by a system of internal roads and a network of internal and external railway lines. The internal rail network links the harbor services area with the Málaga main rail station.

AVE (Alta Velocidad Española, AVE), a high-speed rail service operated by Renfe, the Spanish national railway company, inaugurated the Córdoba-Málaga high-speed rail line, a standard gauge railway line 155 kilometres (96 mi) in length, on 24 December 2007. Designed for speeds of 300 km/h (186 mph) and compatibility with neighboring countries' rail systems, it connects Málaga and Córdoba. The line runs through precipitous terrain in the Sierra Nevada and several viaducts and tunnels were necessary to complete the connections.

Málaga Airport (Aeropuerto de Málaga), the fourth busiest airport in Spain, is important for Spanish tourism as it is the main international airport serving the Costa Del Sol. It is the international airport of Andalusia accounting for 85 percent of its international traffic and is the only one offering a wide variety of international destinations. Málaga Airport is one of the oldest Spanish airports that has stayed in its original location. The ambitious Málaga Plan has been established to meet the increase in the number of passengers, owing primarily to the growth in tourism on the Costa del Sol. It includes the construction of a new terminal and a new car park, as well as the extension of the airfield.

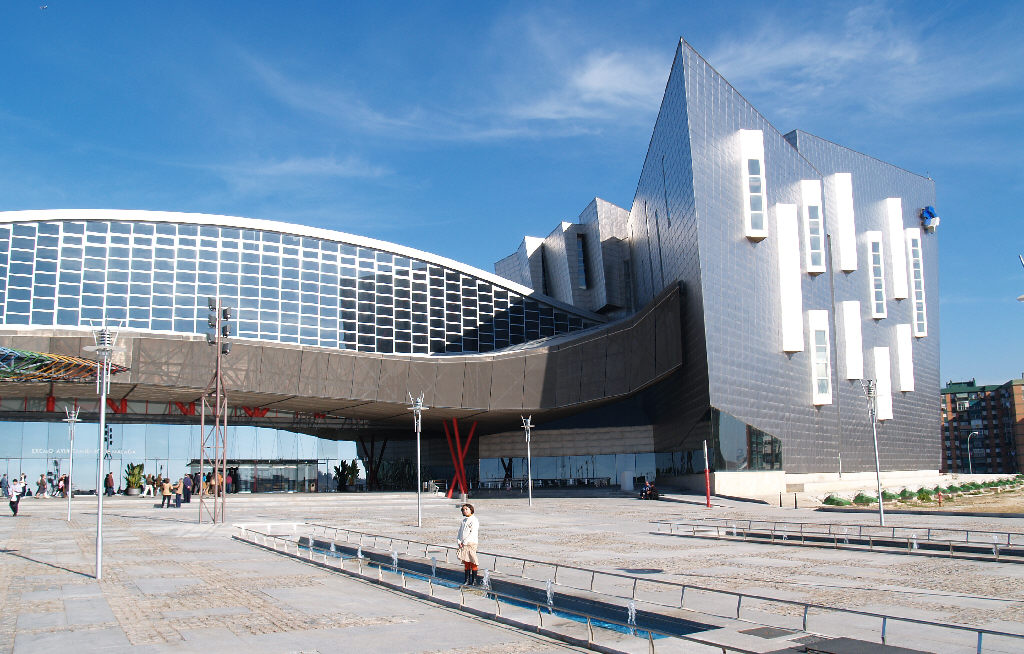
Trade Fairs and Congress Center

A civic convention hall, the Trade Fairs and Congress Center (Spanish: Palacio de Ferias y Congresos de Málaga o Fycma), opened in 2003.

The Club Málaga Valley e-27 is an initiative by a group composed of politicians and business leaders in the telecommunications and information sectors who want to design strategies and implement policies to move Málaga forward in information technology.

The Picasso Museum (Museo Picasso Málaga), opened in 2003 in the Buenavista Palace, has 285 works donated by members of Picasso's family.

The Museo Thyssen Carmen, housing a collection of 19th- and 20th-century Spanish paintings in the Palacio de Villalón and surrounding buildings, opened in 2011.

The Contemporary Art Center of Málaga (CAC) was created by the city council to disseminate and encourage appreciation of modern art. The center is located in the heart of the city, in the former Wholesalers' Market, designed in 1939 by the architect Luis Gutiérrez Soto, one of the preeminent exponents of rationalism in Spanish architecture.

The Málaga Film Festival (Festival de Málaga Cine Español) is the most prestigious festival dedicated exclusively to cinema made in Spain. It is held annually during a week in April.

== See also ==
- Timeline of Málaga
