= Urban planning of Málaga =

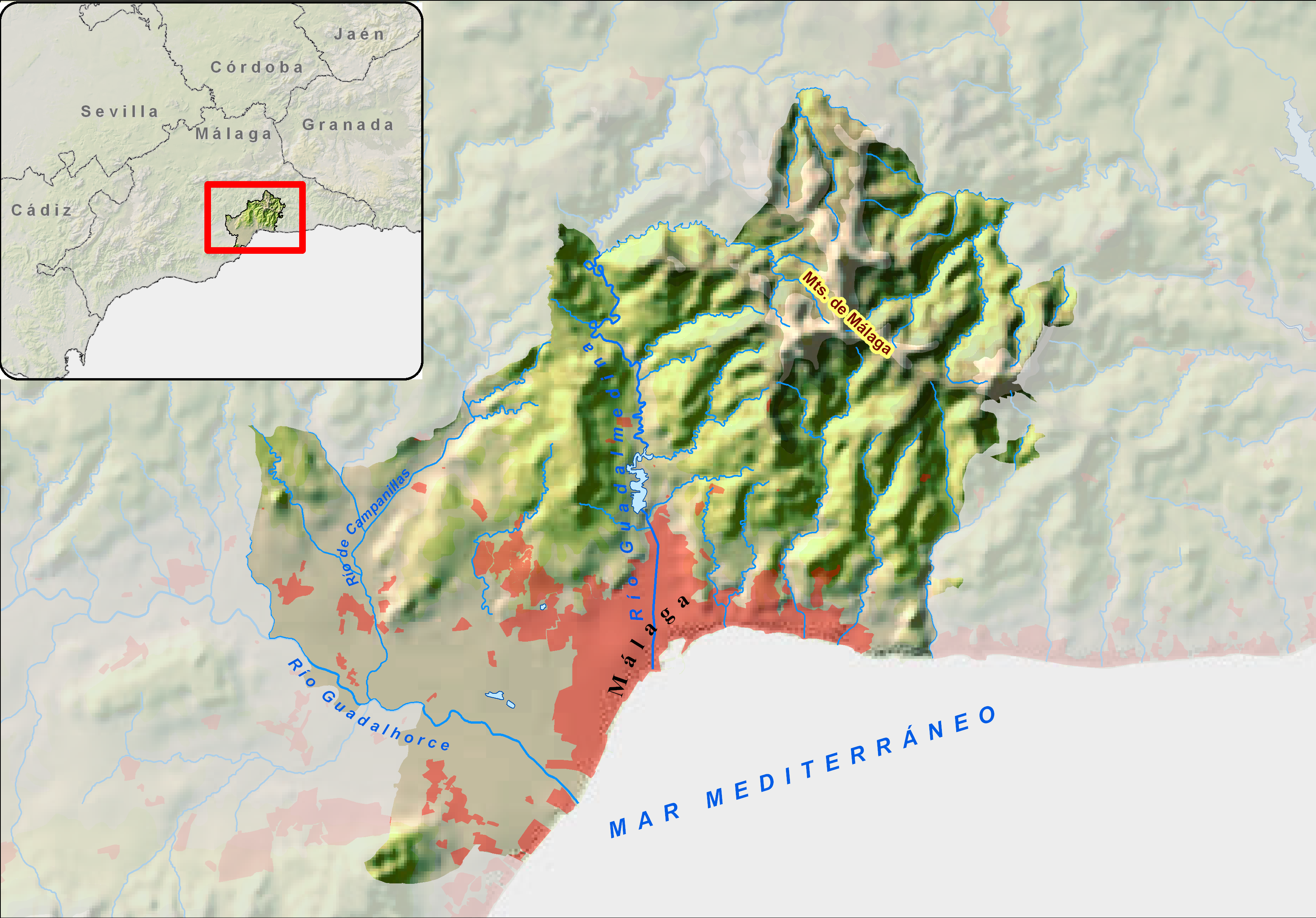
Physical map of the municipal district of Málaga.

The urban planning of Málaga reflects the process of occupation and evolution of the construction in this Spanish city since its founding in the 8th century BC. Topographically, Málaga’s urban layout can be described as an inverted T, with the Guadalmedina River as the vertical axis, still marking a geographical and cultural divide in the city. Three physical factors have shaped Málaga’s urban development: the Mediterranean Sea, the Guadalmedina River, and the proximity of the Montes de Málaga. The eastern part of the city forms a narrow strip of land wedged between sea and mountains, while the western side, toward the broad plain between the Guadalhorce River and the Guadalmedina, known as the Hoya de Málaga, has been the natural area of expansion, giving rise to large neighborhoods throughout the 20th century.

Known first as Malaka and later as Malaca, the history of Málaga spans about 2,700 years, but significant population growth and urbanization did not occur until the 19th century. During the 18th and 19th centuries, the core of what is now the Historic Center, east of the Guadalmedina, took shape. It features an irregular layout inherited from the Muslim period, with a mix of centuries-old residences (in varying states of preservation, many in ruins or under restoration), 19th-century buildings, and modern constructions.

In the eastern zone, except for the La Malagueta neighborhood, single-family homes predominate. These range from traditional fishermen’s houses along the coast to detached residences with gardens in neighborhoods like Pedregalejo and El Limonar, a legacy of the 19th-century industrial bourgeoisie. At the easternmost end lies the historic fishermen’s enclave of El Palo, which retains modest homes, taverns, and a traditional maritime atmosphere, emblematic of Málaga’s heritage.

On the west bank of the Guadalmedina, the urban suburb and industrial zone historically housed workers, laborers, and other working-class residents, a pattern that persisted into the 20th century. The exception is El Perchel, an Arab suburb predating the Reconquista. The rural exodus, as in much of Spain, began in the late 1950s, replacing orchards, dairies, and industrial ruins with working-class neighborhoods populated by rural migrants drawn by job opportunities during the tourism and industrial boom. The result was poorly planned urbanism driven by speculative business interests, exploiting cheap land for maximum profit. Until the 1990s, many of these areas featured traditional corralones, some of which still survive in El Perchel and La Trinidad.

== Origins ==
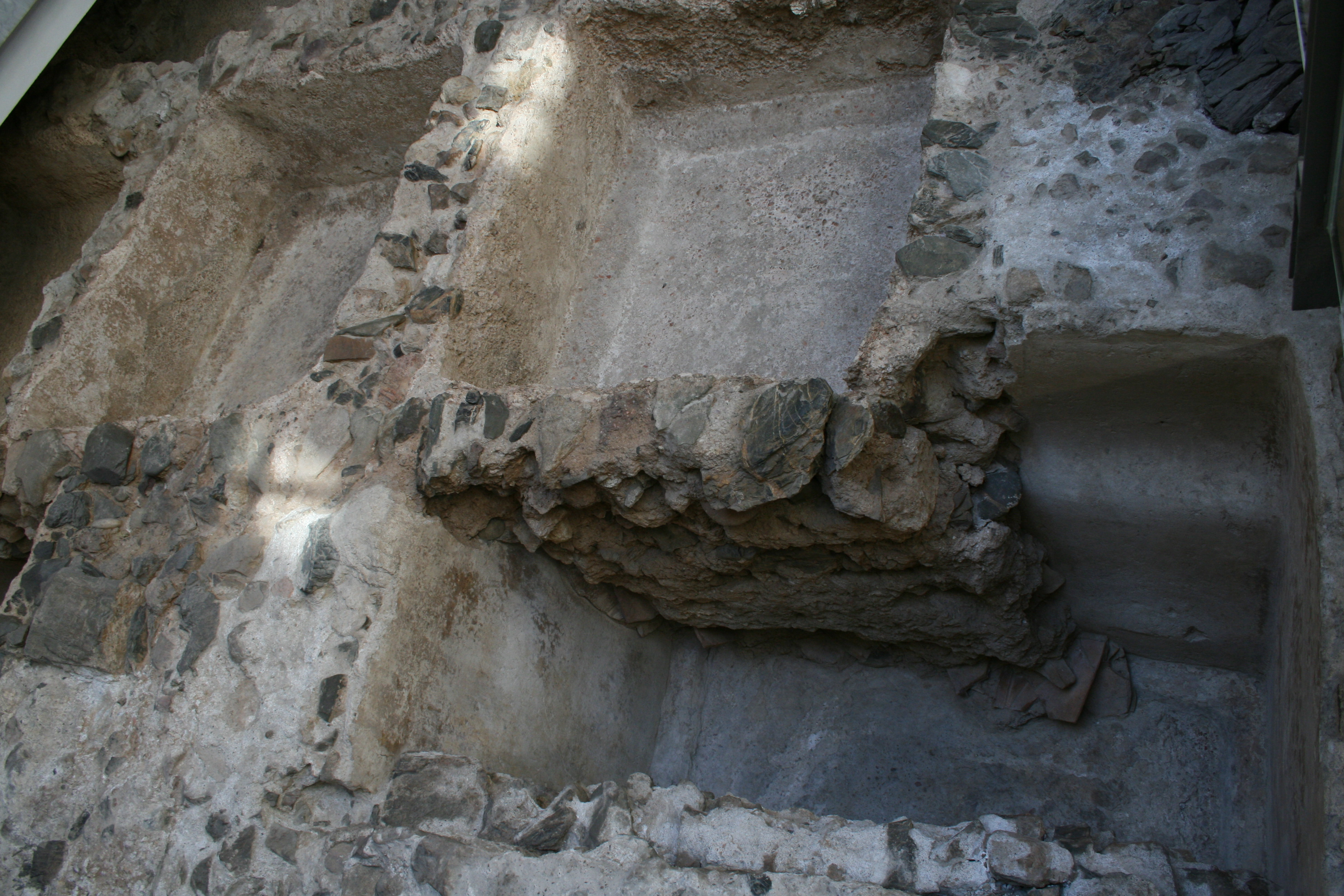
Salting vats from the late Roman Empire period at the University Rectory, where Phoenician remains have also been found.

=== Phoenician Malaka ===
Little is known about Málaga’s urban structure before the Islamic period. Speculation has linked Málaga to the Greek colony of Mainake, but no definitive evidence supports this. However, traces of Phoenician and Roman civilizations have been uncovered. Remains of the Phoenician colony of Mlk or Malaka include sections of the defensive wall beneath basements in the historic center, notably under the Museo Picasso Málaga and the former Post Office building, as well as remnants of a sanctuary or temple on a plot in Calle Císter.

Excavations indicate that the Phoenician settlement extended from the slopes of Gibralfaro to Calle Císter and the Ibn Gabirol gardens, reaching the sea, which at the time lapped against the current University Rectory building. The discovery of a Phoenician necropolis on Calle Andrés Pérez helped establish these boundaries, as Semitic peoples typically placed cemeteries outside populated areas, suggesting that Malaka was confined to this area. It was a small settlement oriented toward the sea, possibly with a rudimentary port or jetty, though no tangible remains have been found.

=== Roman Malaca ===
The Roman Malaca was significantly larger than its Phoenician predecessor, with evidence of a pottery industry around the El Ejido hill and Calle Ollerías in the 1st century. The most prominent remains are those of the Roman Theatre of Málaga, located next to the Alcazaba, along with fragments of the road system and large public baths in the area of Calle Alcazabilla toward Calle Císter. Beyond this area, the structure and layout of the Roman city are poorly understood. Several funerary sectors have been identified on the outskirts, some along communication routes, consistent with the urban planning standards of the Empire adopted generations after the arrival of the Romans.

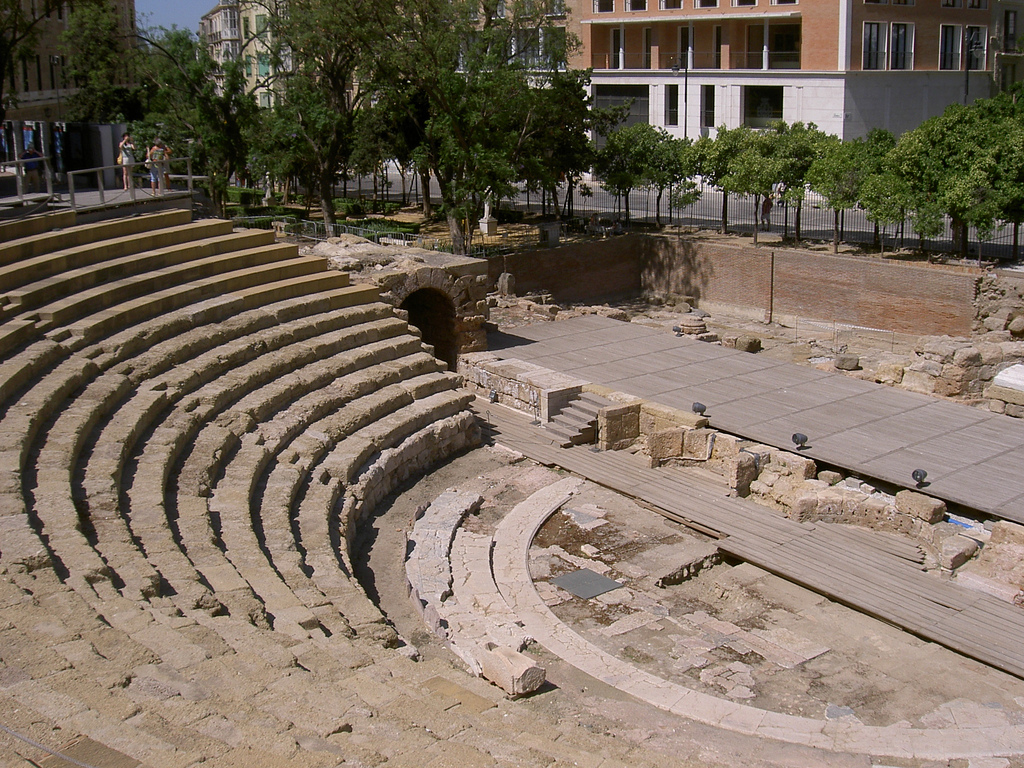
Roman Theatre of Málaga.

The original Phoenician colony became peripheral as the Roman city expanded northward and westward. The forum has not yet been identified, with possible locations under the Palacio de la Aduana, Calle Alcazabilla, or, less likely, the Plaza de la Merced or Plaza de la Constitución. Domestic areas have been confirmed, including a villa on the southern slope of Gibralfaro in the current Puerta Oscura gardens and ancient dwellings north of the Plaza de la Constitución, particularly around Santa Lucía and San Telmo streets. The northward and westward growth is further evidenced by the evolution of funerary sites, with the necropolis at Calle Beatas shifting southwest in the 2nd century, extending toward the Teatro Cervantes and Calle Frailes in the late imperial period.

Under Roman rule, Malaca continued the Phoenician tradition of producing preserves and salts, with remains scattered across the city’s hinterland. A salting factory with eight vats, dated to the late 2nd century, was found near Calle Beatas. This area’s production was complemented by ceramic kilns at Calle Carretería and an associated dump at Calle Álamos, expanding further north and west toward Calle San Juan de Letrán and Calle de la Compañía.

The late Roman defensive wall is partially preserved under buildings at Cortina del Muelle 17 and 19, along Calle Molina Lario, Plaza del Obispo, and Calle Strachan, with three points in the western old town. The Roman city extended beyond the fortified area, with evidence found in Calle Pozos Dulces, near the Guadalmedina riverbed.

=== Byzantine and Visigothic Malaca ===
During the Byzantine period, starting in the mid-6th century, the Roman city’s structure was largely maintained. Warehouses for export goods were located along Calle Molina Lario and Strachan, aligning with the coastline of the time, as evidenced by an anchorage found in Calle Camas. Byzantine traces have also been detected across the Guadalmedina.

With the arrival of the Visigoths and a broader Mediterranean crisis, a process of feudalization began, driven by the decline of garum production and growing insecurity. The population fled en masse to the mountains, abandoning the city. The port disappeared by the 7th century, and Málaga did not recover until the arrival of the Arabs.

== Muslim city ==
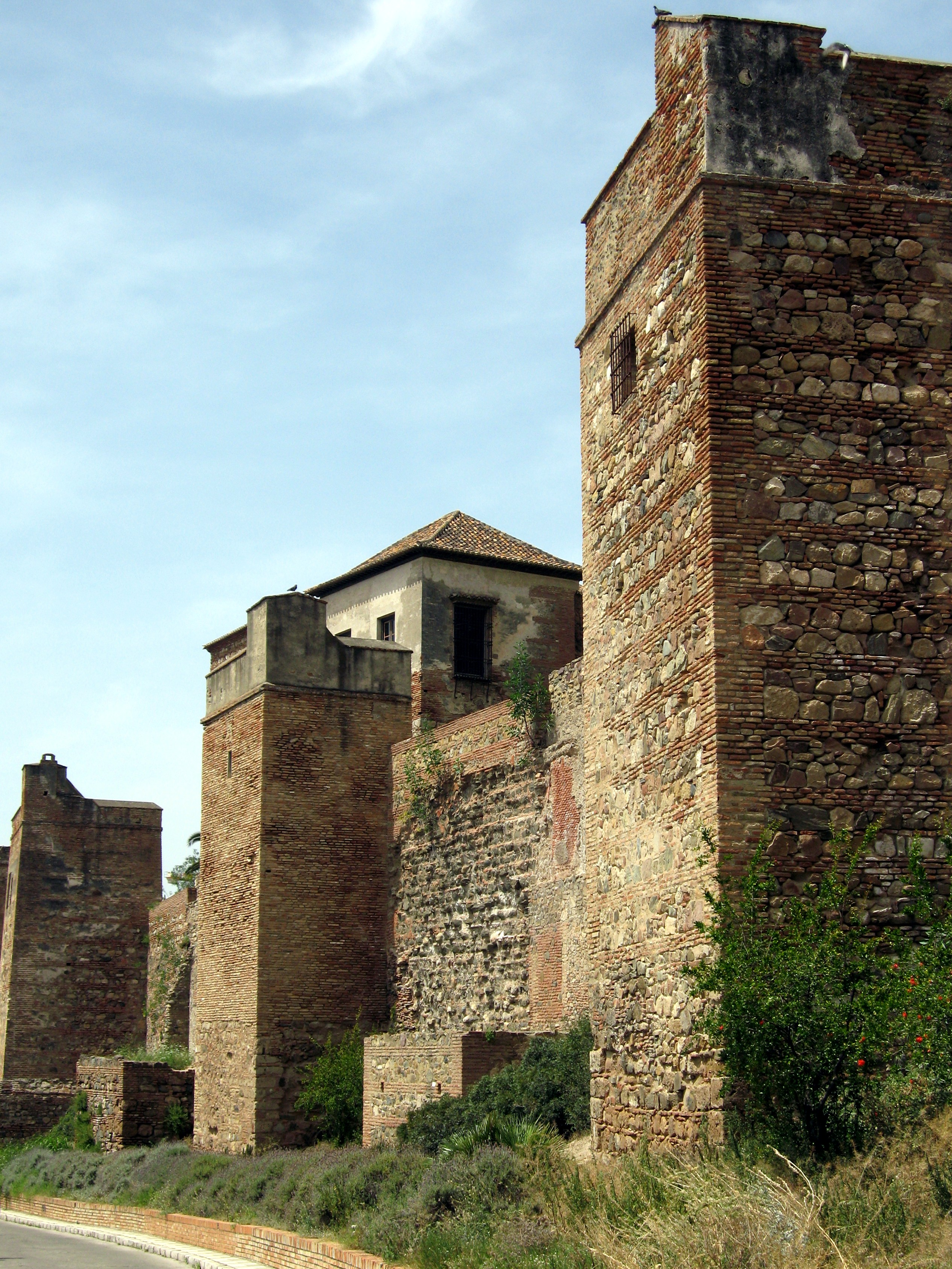
Walls of the Alcazaba.

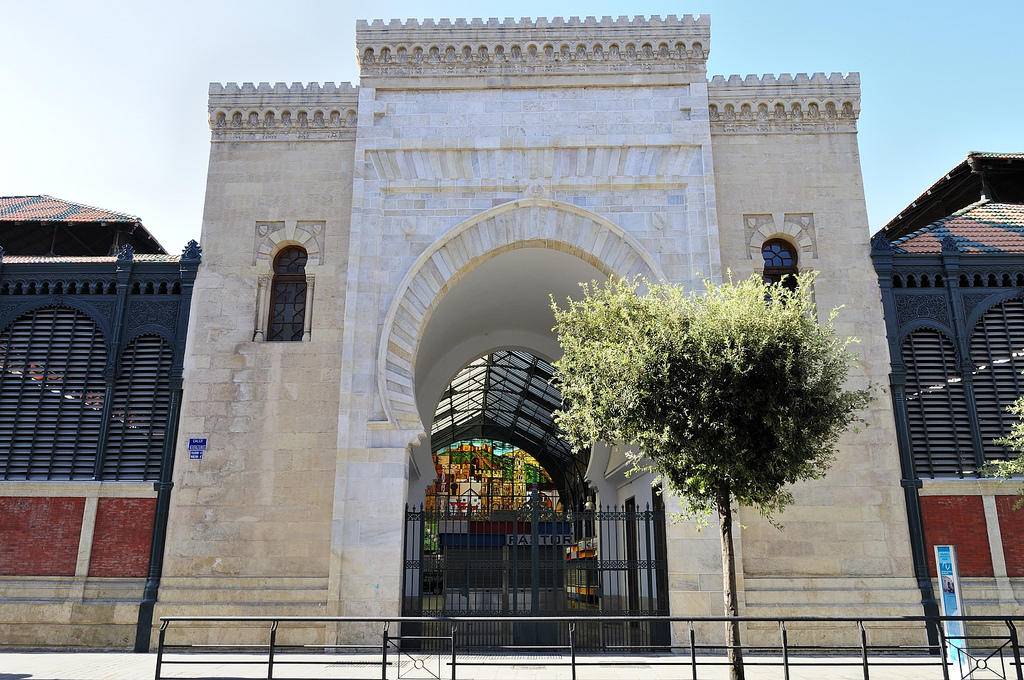
Nasrid gate of the Atarazanas.

In 743, the Arabs entered the city, naming it Mālaqa (مالقة). Initially, its importance was comparable to neighboring settlements like Bezmiliana or Archidona, the capital of the Cora of Rayya, an administrative division covering the current Province of Málaga. With the establishment of the Caliphate of Córdoba in 929, and as a provincial capital, Mālaqa gained prominence, which grew under the Hammudid dynasty and peaked during the Nasrid period.

=== Medina ===
The morphology of Nasrid Mālaqa followed the classic model of medieval Islamic urbanism, comprising the medina, the castle, and the suburbs. The walled perimeter enclosed what is now considered the historic center. The central axis linked the Alcazaba with the Antequera gate, connecting the Plaza de las Cuatro Calles (now Plaza de la Constitución), the souk, and the main mosque. The city was organized along transverse axes, with Calle Granada extending from the plaza to the Granada royal road via the gate of the same name, hosting several mosques and stately homes. The remaining road network featured winding, narrow streets, some of which, like Calle Ascanio, survive today.

=== Alcazaba and Castle ===
Construction of the Alcazaba began in 1065 under King Badis and was expanded during the Nasrid period. Located on the eastern side of the medina, it was enclosed by three walls. The outer enclosure housed the parade ground and accesses to the medina, while the inner enclosure contained palatial quarters and a small intramural neighborhood. The Alcazaba was connected to the Gibralfaro Castle via a protected double-walled pathway, or coracha, used to supply food to soldiers. The castle took its final form under Yusuf I (1333–1354), though parts date earlier. It consists of two walled enclosures and two inner areas: the upper, with the castle’s mosque, a Phoenician-origin well, baths, and the main tower; and the lower, with stables and troop residences.

The city’s defensive system was complemented by watchtowers scattered across the current municipal district and neighboring areas. Surviving examples include the Torre del Prado (also known as Torre de Fajardo or Campanillas tower) near Colmenarejo; the Torre de la Quirosa or Torre de la Alhaja in Los Almendrales; and the Torre de los Verdiales in the area of the same name. Only fragments remain of the towers of Cerrado de Calderón, San Telmo, San Isidro, and del Río, while other standing towers are of Christian origin.

=== Walls ===
The medina’s wall, begun during the Caliphal period, extended from the Alcazaba in a straight line to the Granada gate, not encompassing the Alcazaba. It continued along the southern side of the Plaza de la Merced and Calle Álamos, enclosing the Fontanella suburb. It ran along Calle Puerta de San Buenaventura, the suburb’s entrance, and Calle Carretería to the Antequera gate, then paralleled the Guadalmedina to the Atarazanas. It proceeded to the Genoese castle at the current Plaza de la Marina and along Cortina del Muelle back to the Alcazaba.

The walled enclosure opened to the exterior through several gates: the Granada gate (Bab al-Funtanalla), San Buenaventura, and Antequera (Bab al-Jawja) on the north, the latter being the main entrance; the Bridge gate by the river; the Sea gate (Bab al-Bahr), Baluarte, Espartería (Bab al-Faray), and Seven Arches on the south; and the Oscura and Caba gates linking the medina to the Alcazaba.

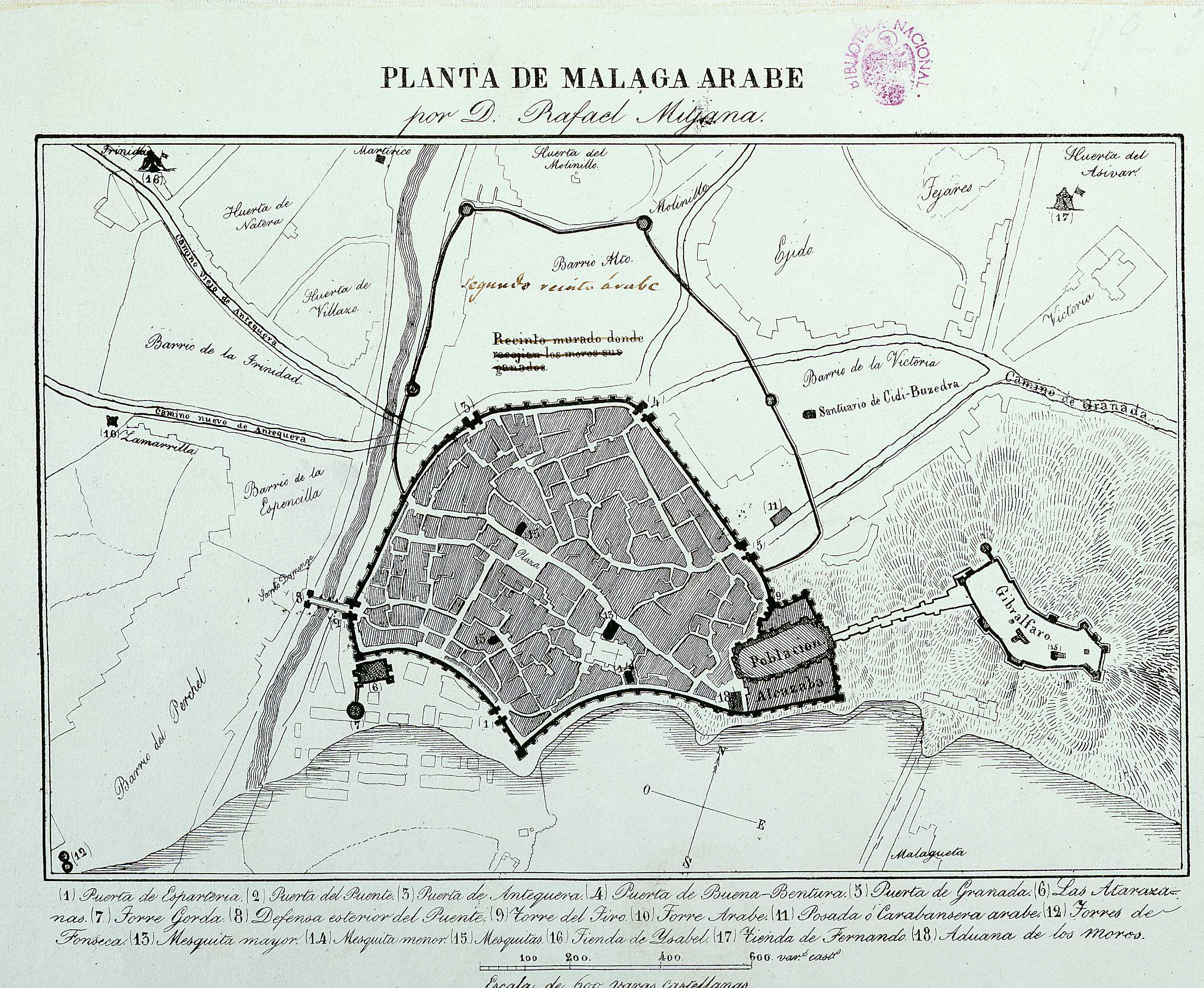
Plan of Arab Málaga, according to architect Rafael Mitjana.

=== Suburbs ===
The urban area was surrounded by orchards, groves, and two suburbs, along with external cemeteries, Jewish quarters, and foreign commercial establishments, notably the Genoese castle near the port from 1278. The Fontanella suburb, the most populous, extended north of the medina, covering the current La Merced, San Felipe Neri, and much of La Goleta neighborhoods, between the streets Frailes, Refino, Postigo, Cruz del Molinillo, and Gigantes. Protected by a smaller wall, it was dedicated to ceramic production, as evidenced by street names like Calle Ollerías. According to Repartimiento documents, it included smaller suburbs like those of the Granada and Antequera gates, as well as orchard and livestock areas. It had all the medina’s amenities, including mosques, public baths, and schools. Pottery activities, inherited from the Romans, thrived due to abundant raw materials and water, expanding north and west. The defensive wall featured several towers and possibly two gates: the Alcohol gate, leading to the Yabal Faruh cemetery, and another at Postigo de Juan Boyero, toward the Casabermeja road.

Across the river lay the Paja merchants’ suburb, or Attabanim, corresponding to the historic El Perchel neighborhood. Formed during the Hammudid period, it previously hosted orchards and small exploitation structures. It extended north to La Trinidad street and south to the beach, where wall fragments have been found. Its orthogonal layout featured homes around courtyards with wells, water supply, drainage, mosques, and baths. Main activities included dyeing, leatherwork, and agriculture. A royal Almohad residence, Qars al-Sayyid, destroyed during the Castilian siege, stood near the current Santo Domingo Church, and the Zamarrilla tower was located in Calle Mármoles.

== Convent City ==
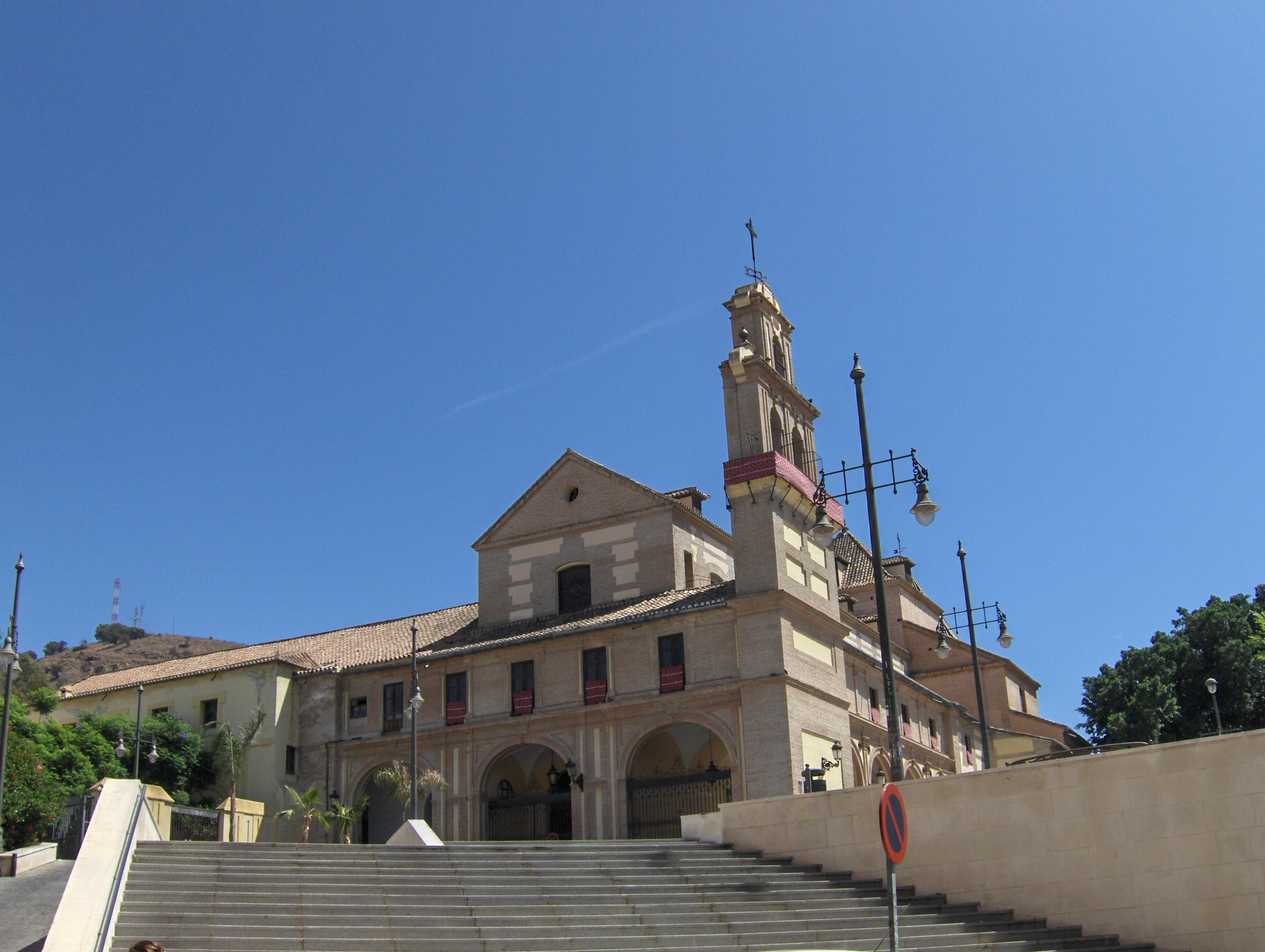
Santuario de la Victoria (Málaga).

Under Castilian rule, the city’s functions changed, but urban layout alterations were minimal, mainly limited to the opening of Calle Nueva. Traced in 1491, this narrow street, by modern standards, facilitated the transport of goods between the Puerta del Mar at the port and the Antequera gate, the main entry for agricultural products from inland orchards, around which warehouses were located.

With the administrative shift, mosques were replaced by churches. The Cathedral of Málaga was built on the main mosque’s foundations, designed by Diego de Siloé. Churches and convents proliferated within the walled area, including San Juan, Mártires, and Santiago. The first religious order to settle was the Observant Franciscans in 1489, under the patronage of the Catholic Monarchs, founding the San Luis el Real convent outside the city walls, near the Guadalmedina. This was followed by the Franciscan Convento de los Ángeles and the Clarisas de la Concepción convent, built in 1505.

Religious orders also established convents outside the walls, creating radial communication routes from the city. Two were built where the Catholic Monarchs camped during the siege: the Convento de la Trinidad at Isabella’s camp, and the Convento de la Victoria at Ferdinand’s. Other convents shaping this radial system included Capuchinos, Santo Domingo, and San Andrés.

Over time, these external churches and convents attracted populations, forming new suburbs often named after them, such as La Trinidad and Capuchinos. By the 17th century, religious institutions occupied a third of the city, with 15 male and 9 female convents or monasteries. Notable secular buildings included the San Juan de Dios, Santo Tomás, and San Julián hospitals, the Consulate, the Alhóndiga, and the Town Hall.

Characteristic of Spanish cities of this era were wayside crosses. Málaga had four, located at the city’s edges along royal roads. Only the cross at Cruz del Humilladero plaza survives, once in an open area where the Cártama and Churriana roads met. Others stood on the Vélez-Málaga road at La Caleta’s humilladero, the Granada road at Huerta del Acíbar near El Ejido, and Zamarrilla’s humilladero on Calle de los Mármoles, the old Antequera road.

== Enlightenment Transformations ==
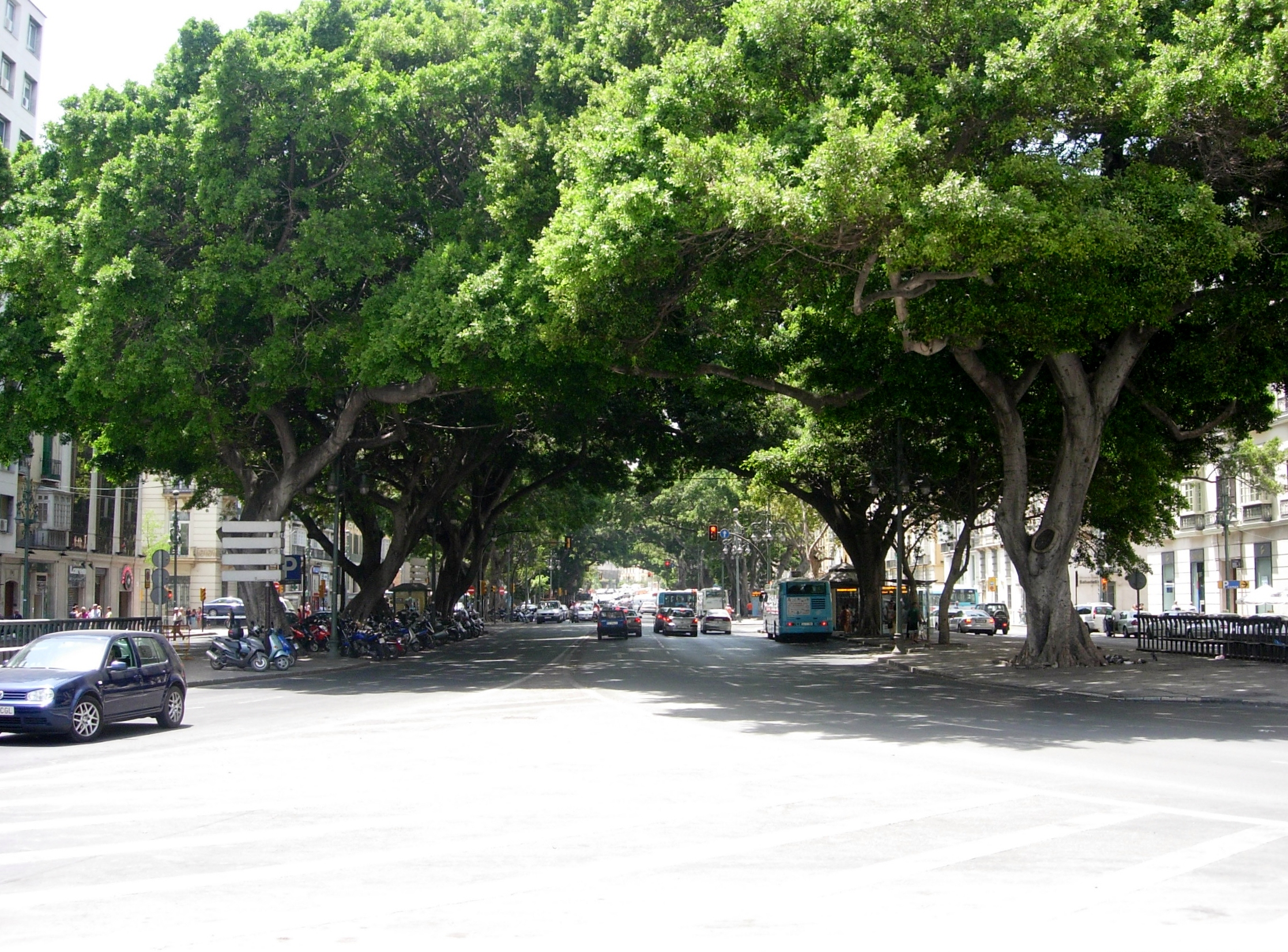
Alameda Principal.

In the 18th century, Málaga experienced economic and demographic growth driven by port trade, particularly from the third decade onward. The city expanded in several directions, notably toward San Andrés beach, Capuchinos, La Trinidad, and La Caleta. With the dynastic change at the court, new urban concepts emerged in Spain, emphasizing urban beautification. In Málaga, this led to wide, geometric spaces and palatial residences, including the Aduana, Episcopal Palace, Plaza del Obispo, and the Society of Friends of the Country building, alongside the gradual demolition of the walls.

=== Creation of the Alameda ===
The century’s major project was the Alameda, a grand tree-lined promenade between the old city and the Pescadería port district. Contemporary with projects like Granada’s Salón, Cádiz’s Apodaca, Seville’s Alameda de Hércules, and Madrid’s Paseo del Prado, it was designed by engineer López Mercader in 1783. Initially planned to run parallel to the southern defensive wall, the walls were later demolished to widen the avenue. The Alameda became a social hub, later expanded with fountains, ponds, and sculptures. The old San Lorenzo castle near the Guadalmedina was razed, opening the perpendicular Alameda de Colón. The mercantile high bourgeoisie, the Oligarchy of the Alameda, made it their residence, building stately homes along the new axis.

=== Major Engineering Works ===
Significant engineering projects benefited the city, notably the river’s channelization and port expansion. In 1717, Philip V commissioned Flemish engineer Bartolomé Thurus to design a port expansion to meet commercial and defensive needs. The project extended the Levante dike, capped with a lantern, and built the Poniente commercial pier with the San Felipe fort at its end. Work continued intermittently, with the Atarazanas warehouses expanded in 1775 and a lazaretto built in 1776.

Prosperity and population growth in the century’s final quarter exacerbated the historic water supply issue, worsened by a drought. To address this, an aqueduct was built, drawing water from the Guadalmedina over nearly 11 kilometers, supplying agricultural irrigation and mill power. Authorized by a Royal Order from Charles III in 1782, the water reached Málaga’s main reservoir in Calle Refino on September 7, 1784. Architect José Martín de Aldehuela designed a technically and aesthetically sophisticated structure, using varied materials and colored plaster for visual appeal.

Intense deforestation in the Guadalmedina basin since the late 15th century caused frequent floods in the 18th century. The river’s surges, combined with tributaries like Barcenillas, La Manía, Calvario, and Olletas in the Calle Victoria and Calle Carretería areas, led to tragedies, notably the 1764 flood. Proposals to divert the Guadalmedina westward and build retaining walls were made, but cost prevented diversion. Retaining walls were built to protect low-lying areas.

Improvements were also made to major roads, particularly the Málaga–Vélez-Málaga route, vital for exporting raisins and wines from the Axarquía via the Port of Málaga. The Torremolinos road was enhanced, and an alternative Antequera route, the Colmenar road, was created.

== Bourgeois City ==
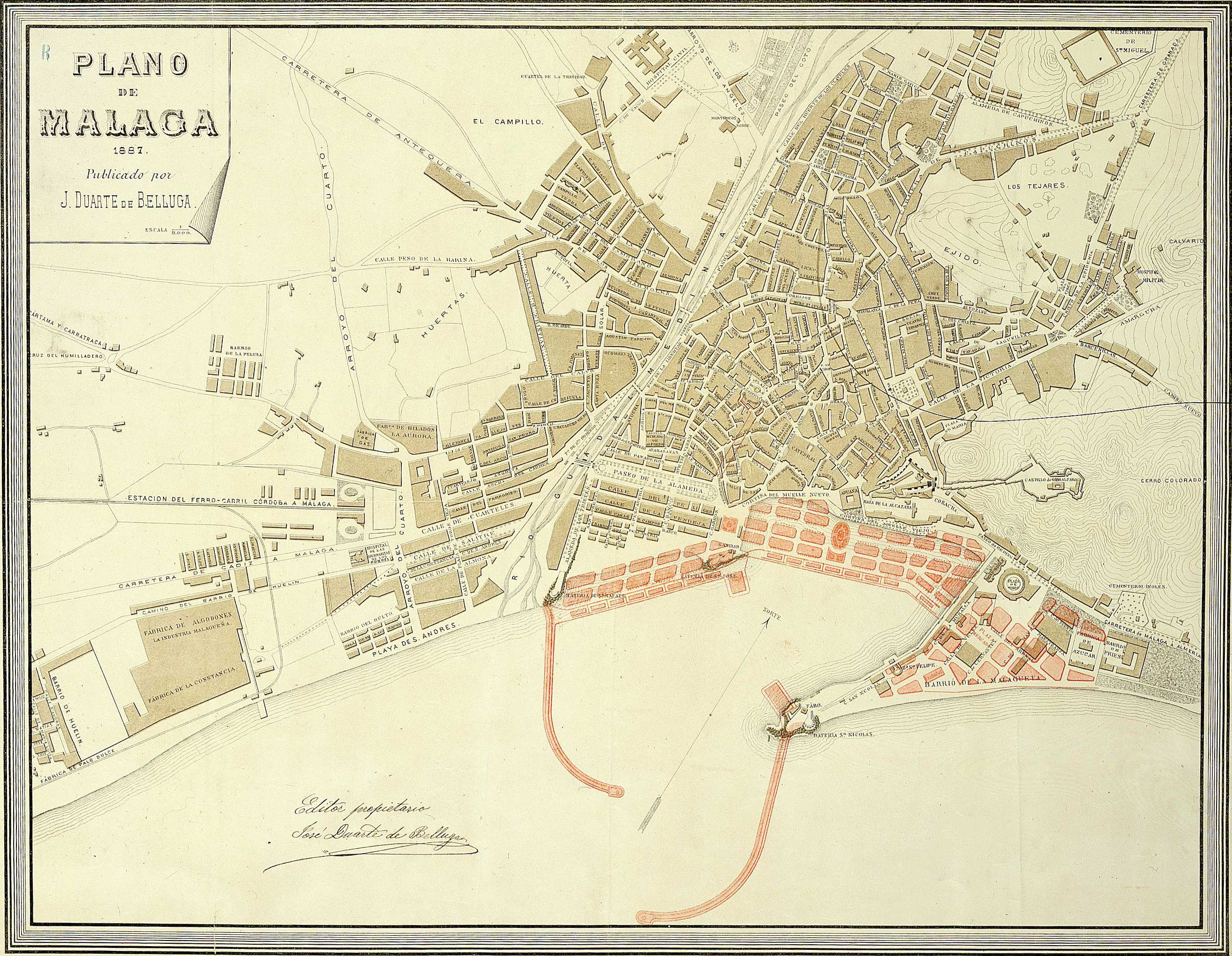
Map of Málaga in 1887, showing expansion and internal reform projects.

In the 19th century, demographic growth and morphological changes, driven by confiscation and the rise of textile and metallurgical industries, transformed the historic center. Numerous buildings from this period remain, including the central axis of the old town, Calle Larios, designed by engineer José María de Sancha. The buildings lining the street, crafted by Eduardo Strachan Viana-Cárdenas, introduced the Chicago School style with a European boulevard flair inspired by Haussmann.

=== Effects of confiscation ===
The incorporation of large religious properties into the real estate market through successive disentailments significantly impacted the road network of the historic center and the former Fontanella suburb, then called Barrio Alto. New blocks required roads to integrate them into the urban fabric. The 1890 demolition of the Santa Clara convent led to the opening of Calle Molina Lario and Duque de la Victoria streets, the realignment of Calle Santa María, and the creation of Plaza del Siglo. The San Bernardo convent’s site gave rise to Denis Belgrano, Niño de Guevara, and Méndez Núñez streets, opened in 1871. The Santa María de la Paz convent’s plot became the Casas de Campos and its namesake passage, forming the northern façade of the Plaza de la Merced, home to Picasso’s birthplace. The Merced convent’s demolition freed space for the Teatro Cervantes.

In the western center, the San Pedro de Alcántara convent’s 1837 demolition resulted in the Teatro and San Pedro de Alcántara plazas and the widening of Calle Comedias. The San Francisco convent’s demolition created Plaza de San Francisco and the streets Don Rodrigo, de los Cristos, and Gigantes. The Angel Dominican Nuns’ convent demolition led to Luis de Velásquez street and the realignment of Calle del Ángel, while the Carmelites’ convent demolition opened Sánchez Pastor street. The Augustinian Discalced Nuns convent gave way to the Pasaje Chinitas off Plaza de la Constitución, and the Capuchinas convent’s site became Calle Echegaray, opened in 1876.

The disentailed plots fostered an elegant, homogeneous bourgeois architecture, still characteristic of much of the historic center. Unlike the grand mansions of the aristocracy and high bourgeoisie in the eastern city, these areas housed the emerging 19th-century middle class, favoring stately Neoclassical buildings, typically three stories with a ground floor, attic, and rounded corners.

=== Calle Larios ===
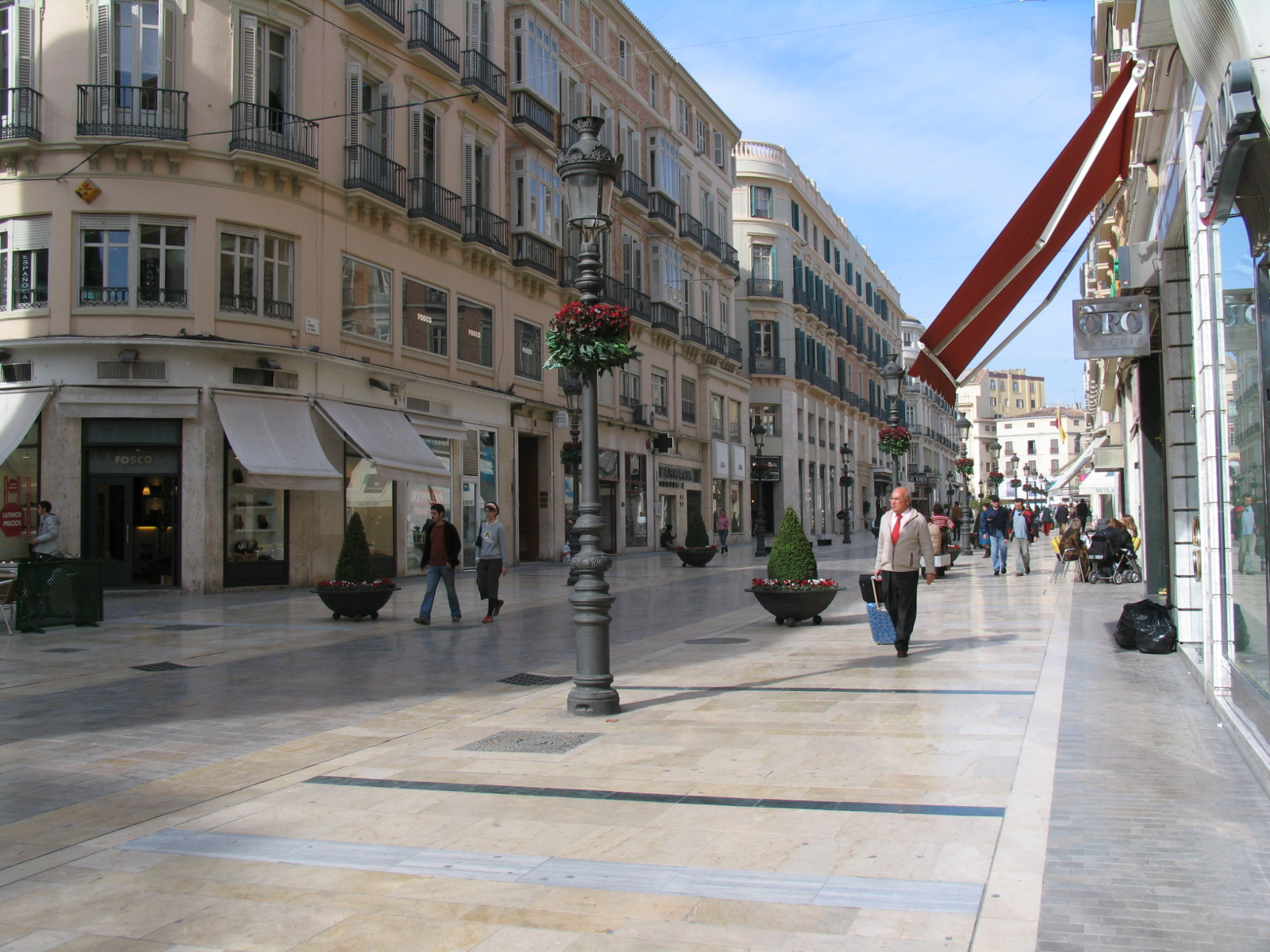
Calle Larios.

A severe cholera epidemic in 1833 highlighted the need to improve sanitary conditions in the city center, an issue noted in the previous century (see: Cholera pandemics in Spain). The 1859 Expansion Plan by architect José Moreno Monroy proposed a major street from Plaza de la Constitución to Boquete del Muelle, near the current park, but funding was denied by the central government. In 1878, engineer José María de Sancha proposed three new streets, including the future Calle Larios, designed by municipal architect Joaquín de Rucoba.

The city council approved the plan that year, forming a joint-stock company for funding. When the company failed, the Larios family took over in 1886, completing the street and its twelve surrounding blocks by 1891. Innovative features included a wooden pavement to reduce carriage noise, lost after the 1907 flood.

=== Impact of Industrialization ===
Industrialization, sparked by the La Constancia ironworks in 1826, expanded into textiles, cotton, brandy, chemicals, canning, lithography, and soap. The preferred expansion zone was the right bank of the Guadalmedina, transforming the fishermen’s El Perchel into a working-class area, from which proletarian neighborhoods spread westward. La Trinidad retained a more agricultural character with estates like Suárez and Gamarra.

From the 1830s, industrialization intensified, but by the 1860s, overcrowding highlighted the need to expand beyond traditional limits. The 1861 Expansion Plan offered little new urban space, failing to address growth pressures. By then, the western zone hosted seven metallurgical, textile, and chemical factories employing over 4,000 workers daily, growing to twelve by decade’s end.

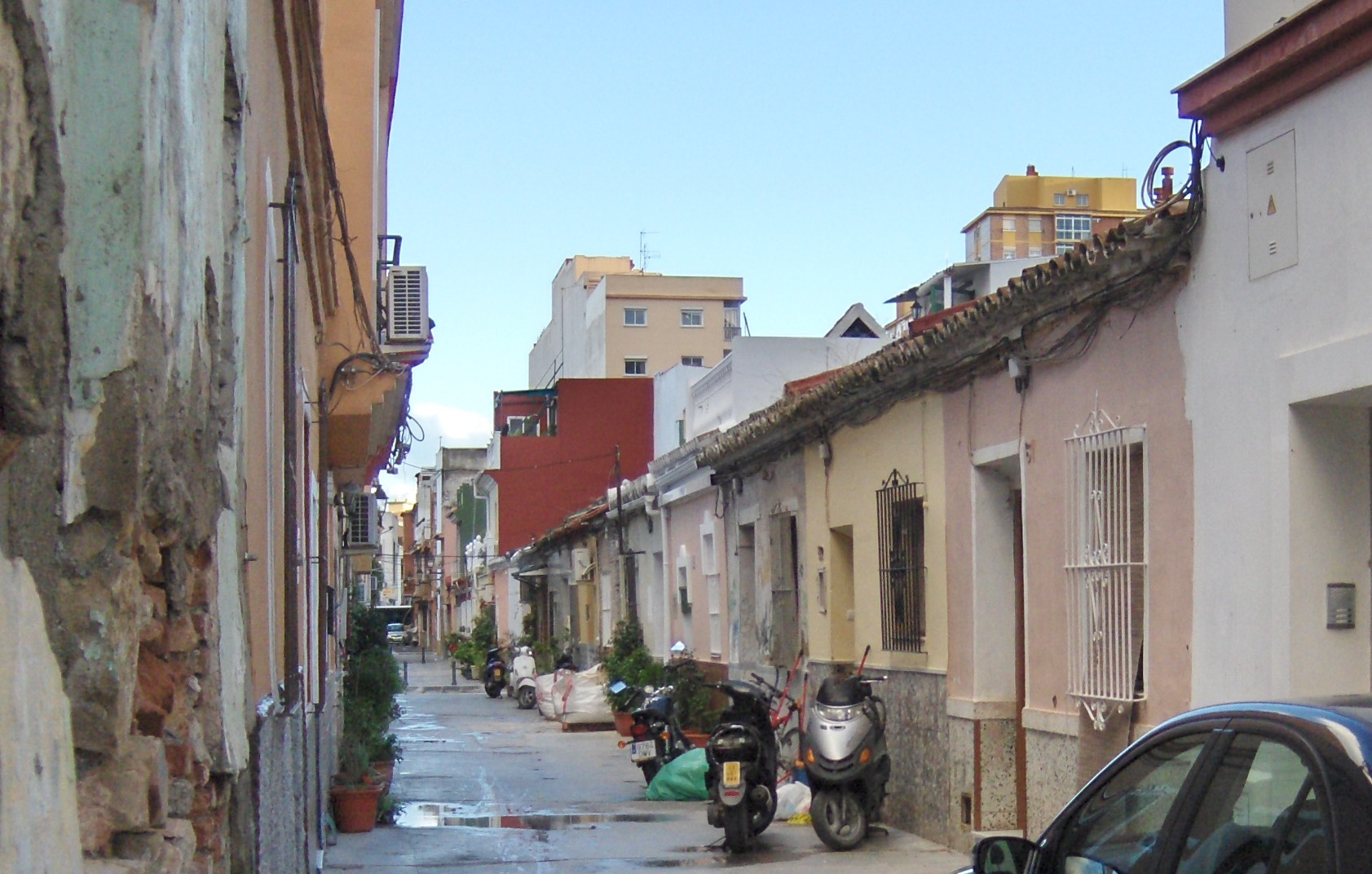
Calle Villarroel, preserving some original homes from the Huelin working-class neighborhood project.

Early industrial working-class areas consisted of corralones, like El Bulto, built in 1851 by Manuel Agustín Heredia, where workers lived in extreme conditions. In 1868, industrialist Eduardo Huelin Reissig proposed the Huelin working-class neighborhood near factories, outside planned expansions. Aimed at affordable large-scale housing, it inspired later designs for La Pelusa, northern La Trinidad, and El Molinillo.

The project sought to improve workers’ living conditions and eliminate social hubs like taverns and corralón courtyards, seen as breeding grounds for labor movement ideas. It featured single-family homes in small blocks, with two-story corner houses for foremen, a church, a dispensary, and a school, comprising over 1,000 homes—one of Spain’s largest projects of the era.

Tramways, introduced from 1893 with English and Belgian capital, primarily served the historic center and eastern zone, following several unexecuted 1870s proposals.

=== Expansions (ensanches) ===
The new port expansion freed up land in Plaza de la Marina, Calle Cortina del Muelle, and Haza Baja de la Alcazaba, enabling the extension of the Alameda to the Farola promenade. Reclamation began in 1897, shaping the Parque de Málaga through successive works, designed by architects like Eduardo Strachan Viana-Cárdenas, Manuel Rivera Vera, Fernando Guerrero Strachan, and Joaquín de Rucoba, with Rucoba as the lead.

The first Málaga Expansion Plan, approved in 1861 by José Moreno Monroy, and another in 1892 by Emilio de la Cerda or José María de Sancha, were not executed in the 19th century. The definitive Ensanche Heredia took shape with Daniel Rubio’s 1929 Expansion Plan.

=== New Bourgeois Neighborhoods ===
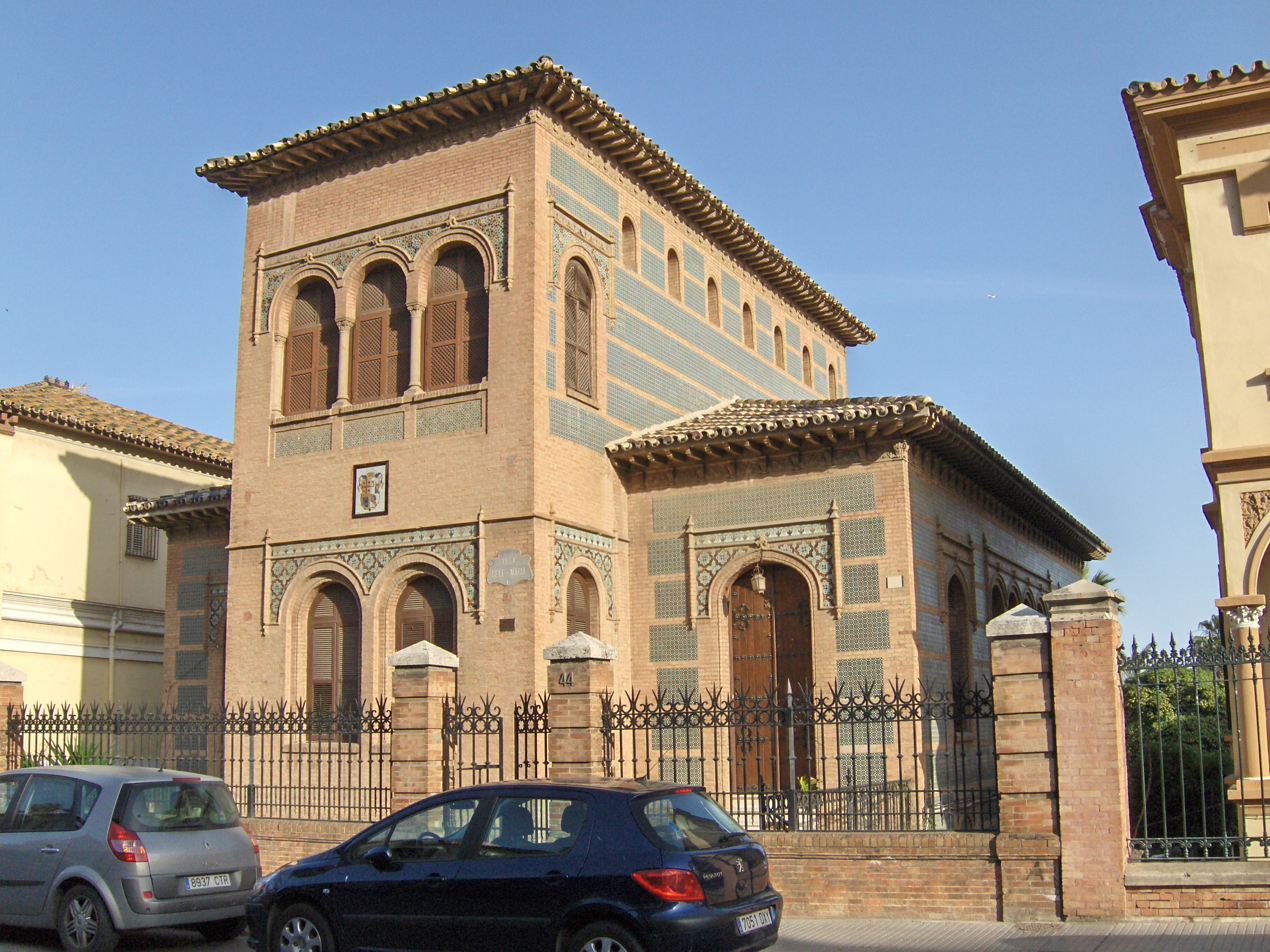
Villa Cele María.

Expansion eastward, a byproduct of industrialization, saw the bourgeoisie, enriched by economic prosperity, build homes rather than factories. In the early century, Teodoro Reding continued wall demolitions, opening the Paseo de Reding, soon a hub for the aristocracy. The 1848 opening of the Vélez road, between the Gibralfaro and Sancha hills and the sea, enabled housing development, forming neighborhoods like La Caleta, El Limonar, Bellavista, and Miramar, characterized by elegant villas with lush gardens, continuing into the next century. Engineer José María de Sancha, who urbanized the area, built Villa Cele María on the namesake promenade.

Unlike the historic center’s restrained buildings, eastern homes featured ornate Neobaroque, Neomudéjar, and Neo-Arabic styles. Some were later bought by inland families as summer or winter residences, with others converted into hotels, making the area a prime tourist zone.

== Modern Urbanism ==
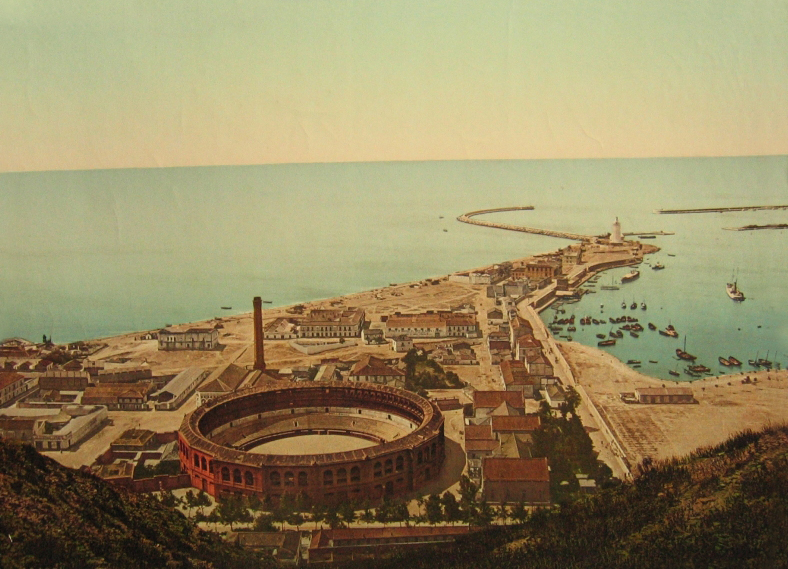
La Malagueta around 1900.

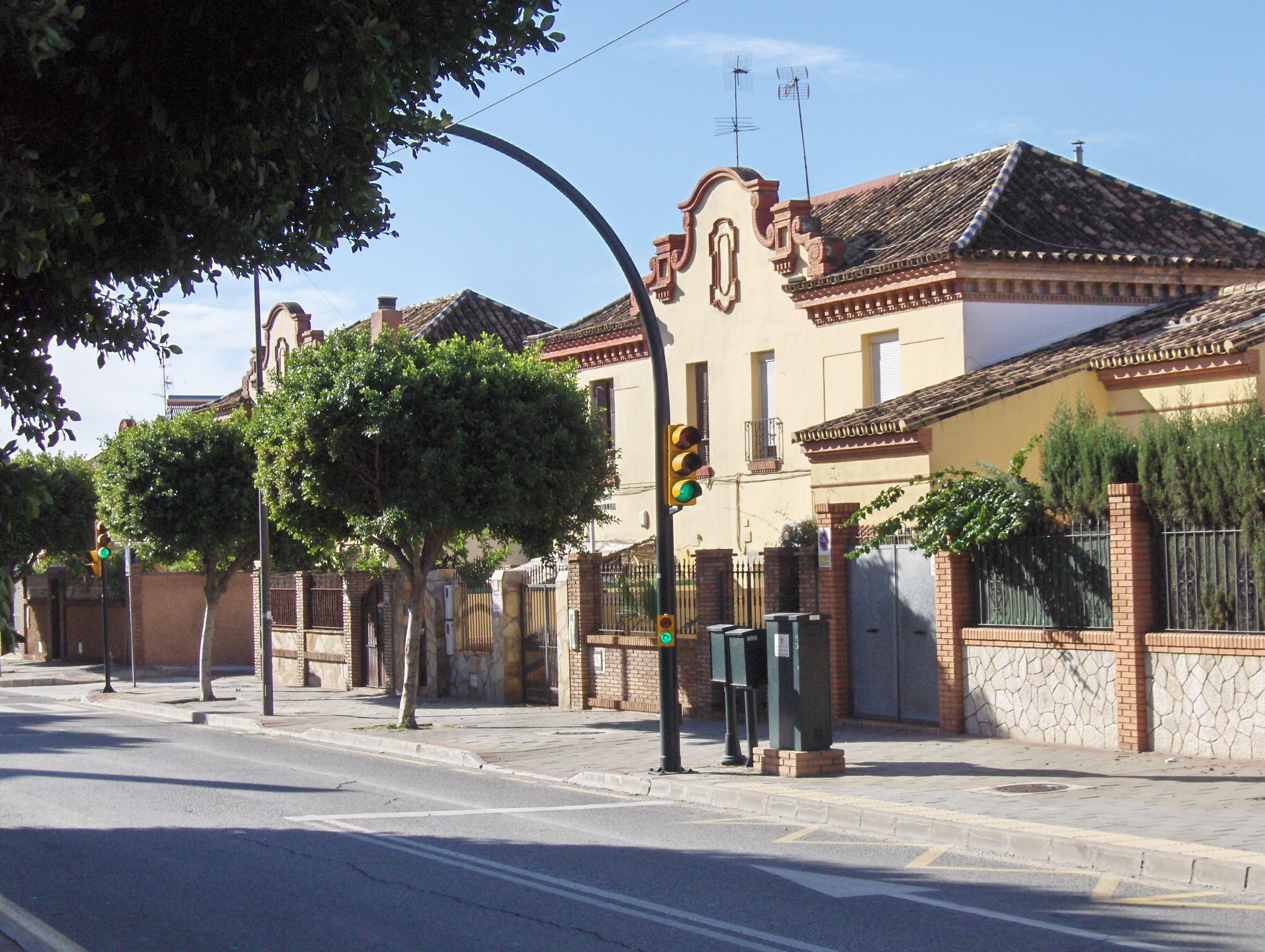
Typical homes in Ciudad Jardín.

=== Great Reforms Plan ===
Modern urbanism in Málaga is generally dated to the adoption of comprehensive urban problem-solving and planned growth. The 1924 Municipal Statute mandated expansion plans for large municipalities, leading to Málaga’s Great Reforms Plan. It aimed to improve sanitation and sewerage infrastructure, reform historic center streets, define new western axes (with new bridges over the river), and develop Ciudad Jardín.

The late 19th and early 20th centuries saw economic depression from the collapse of metallurgical and textile industries and the devastating phylloxera plague. Yet, demographic pressure grew with rural immigrants ruined by the plague. This spurred “cheap housing” policies for workers, preceded by the América working-class neighborhood, funded by Argentine donations after the 1907 flood. These policies led to the Carmen and Misericordia neighborhoods, expansions of La Trinidad, and the construction of Victoria Eugenia and Ciudad Jardín, inspired by Ebenezer Howard’s Garden City.

These projects fell short of demand, and in the 1920s, overcrowding worsened in La Trinidad, El Perchel, and Capuchinos. Spontaneous settlements emerged in the periphery, like Torremolinos and El Palo, and shantytowns spread to Perro beach, Misericordia, La Malagueta’s Arenal, Arroyo del Cuarto, El Ejido, and Mangas Verdes.

=== Rubio Plan ===
The 1924 plan was followed by Daniel Rubio’s Expansion Plan, approved in 1929, incorporating modern urbanism concerns like overcrowding and density control. It reported a density of 302 inhabitants per hectare (663 in the Carmen district), compared to 250 in Madrid and 110 in Barcelona.

The plan introduced a radial and concentric road system, proposing the northward extension of Calle Larios to El Ejido and the Alameda–Park axis in both directions, crossing La Trinidad westward and La Malagueta eastward to the Maritime Promenade. It emphasized protecting historically and artistically significant streets and organizing neighborhoods like El Palo and Churriana. Political upheavals and the tumultuous events of the 1930s, followed by the Spanish Civil War, during which Málaga was repeatedly bombed, prevented implementation, worsening living conditions.

== Franco Dictatorship ==
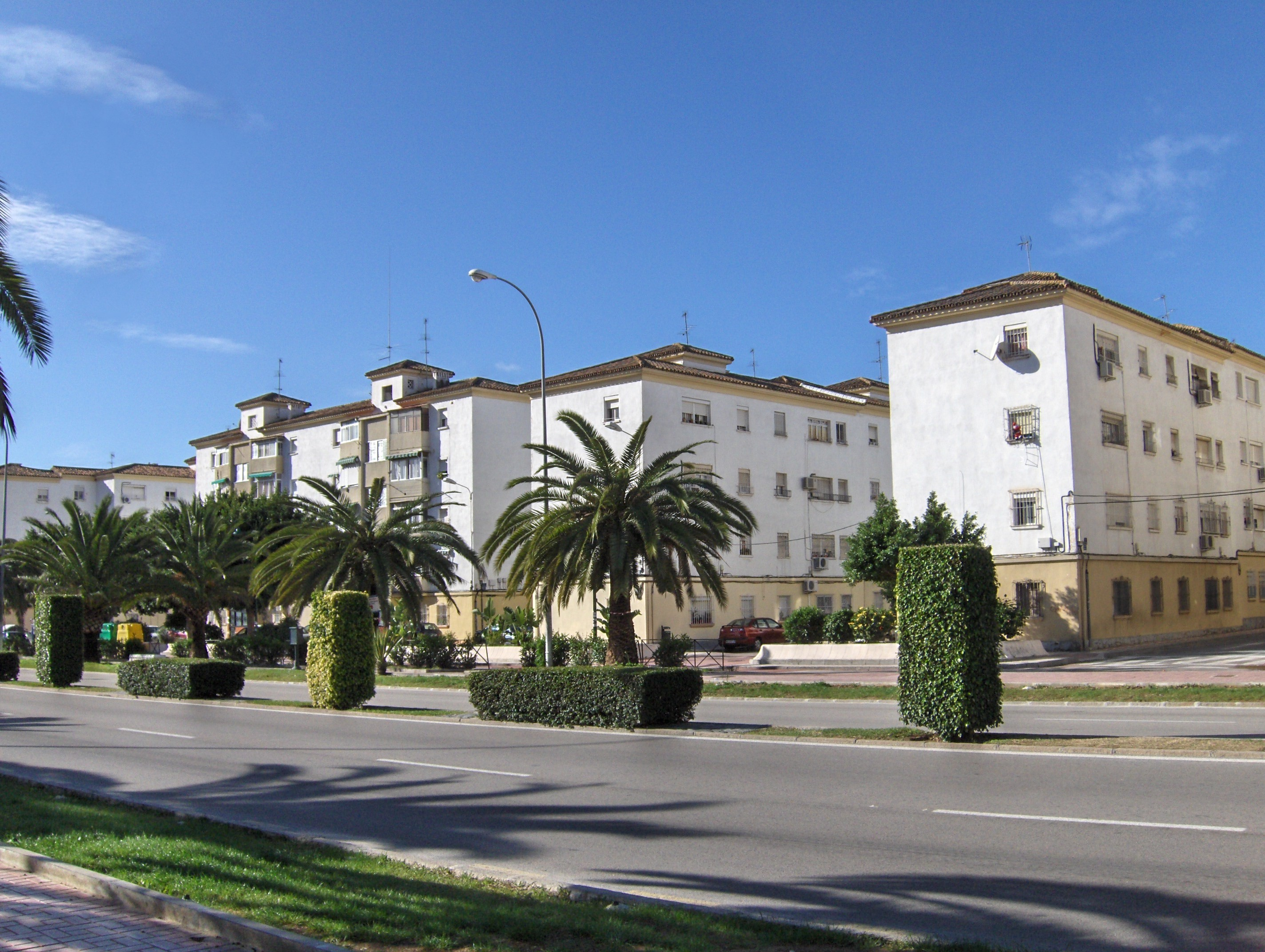
Herrera Oria housing group (Ciudad Jardín District, 1962), a typical example of public social housing built under the National Movement during the González Edo Plan.

=== Autarkic Urbanism ===
In the 1940s, rural exodus, coupled with authorities’ refusal to allow emigration abroad, fueled substandard housing and shantytowns, spreading to areas like Arroyo del Cuarto and nearly reaching the center by the 1950s.

The González Edo Plan aimed to provide infrastructure while preserving Málaga’s traditional neighborhoods, limiting high-rise construction, and promoting single-family homes (so-called casemates). It included prior plans’ central layout changes, like extending Larios and the Alameda, and diverting the Guadalmedina.

During the plan, neighborhoods built included Generalísimo Franco de Carranque (1950), Canódromo housing group (1953), Sixto (1954), José Antonio Girón (1955), Santa Julia (1957), Portada Alta (1957), 26 de Febrero, 4 de Diciembre (1959), and the housing groups José Solís Ruiz (1960), Herrera Oria (1962), and Virgen del Carmen (1964). These shared rural aesthetic principles, functioning as self-sufficient units, forming a new western urban ring.

With the onset of developmentalism and the tourism boom, national development plans took precedence, and the González Edo Plan was annulled by a 1964 Supreme Court ruling, following lobbying by real estate developers who saw it as contrary to their interests.

=== Desarrollismo Urbanism ===
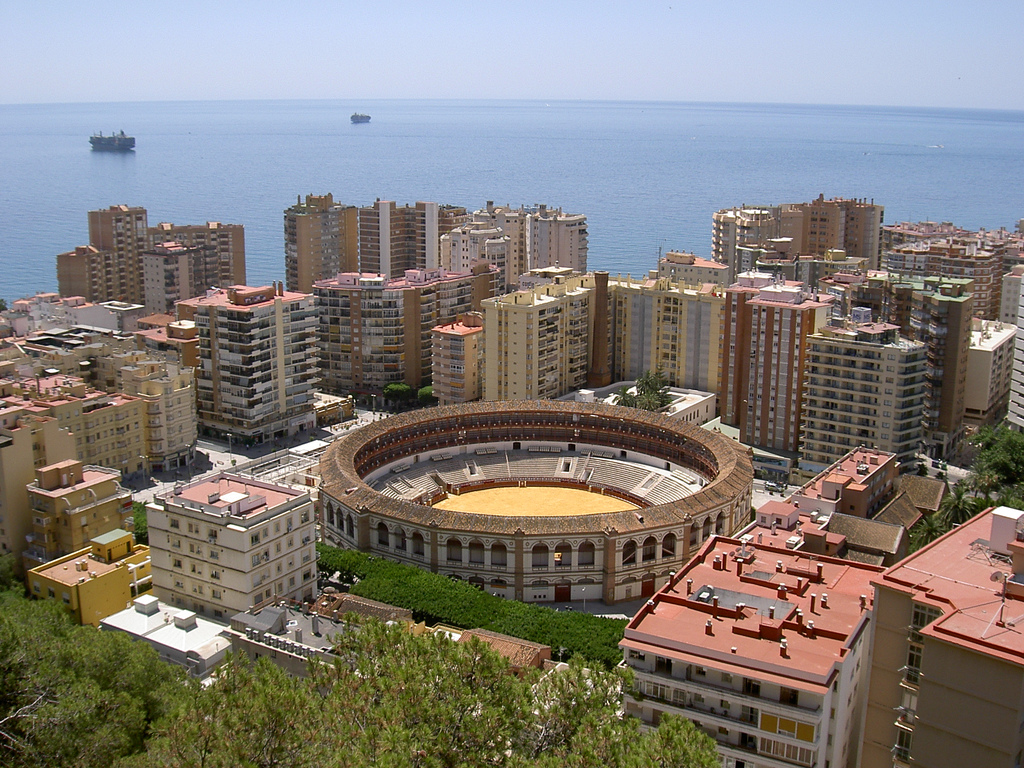
La Malagueta, a quintessential example of developmentalist urbanism.

Lack of planning, speculation, and rapid growth defined the developmentalism urbanism of the later Franco era. From the mid-1960s tourism boom, private initiatives dominated new neighborhood development. While the administration contributed to areas like Virreina, La Palmilla, Puerta Blanca, and La Paz, private developers often abandoned projects post-construction, neglecting agreed-upon infrastructure. The city grew irrationally, without public or administrative control. Speculation drove most housing projects, often exceeding density limits, as in Jardín de la Abadía, La Palma, and San Andrés.

As peripheral neighborhoods burgeoned, central areas like Jardín de la Abadía, El Bulto, and La Trinidad deteriorated. A major operation was the partial demolition of historic El Perchel, rebuilt with high-rise blocks yielding huge developer profits. Chaos became intolerable in areas like Nuevo San Andrés 1, Huelin, and Suárez, lacking basic utilities like electricity, water, sewerage, and paved roads, which turned to mud in rain. Many residents lived in shanties or 19th-century corralones, with families of four or five crammed into 4m² spaces, as in El Bulto.

The Suárez neighborhood exemplifies this: planned with 140,000m² of green spaces, only 11,000m² were built, treeless. The administration ignored private sector violations and actively supported their interests, declaring many buildings ruinous to enable large-scale urban projects.

Clandestine developments proliferated in the outskirts (Campanillas, Churriana, Puerto de la Torre) and self-built neighborhoods like Mangas Verdes. From 1974, neighborhood associations emerged, some facing legalization hurdles.

== Democracy ==
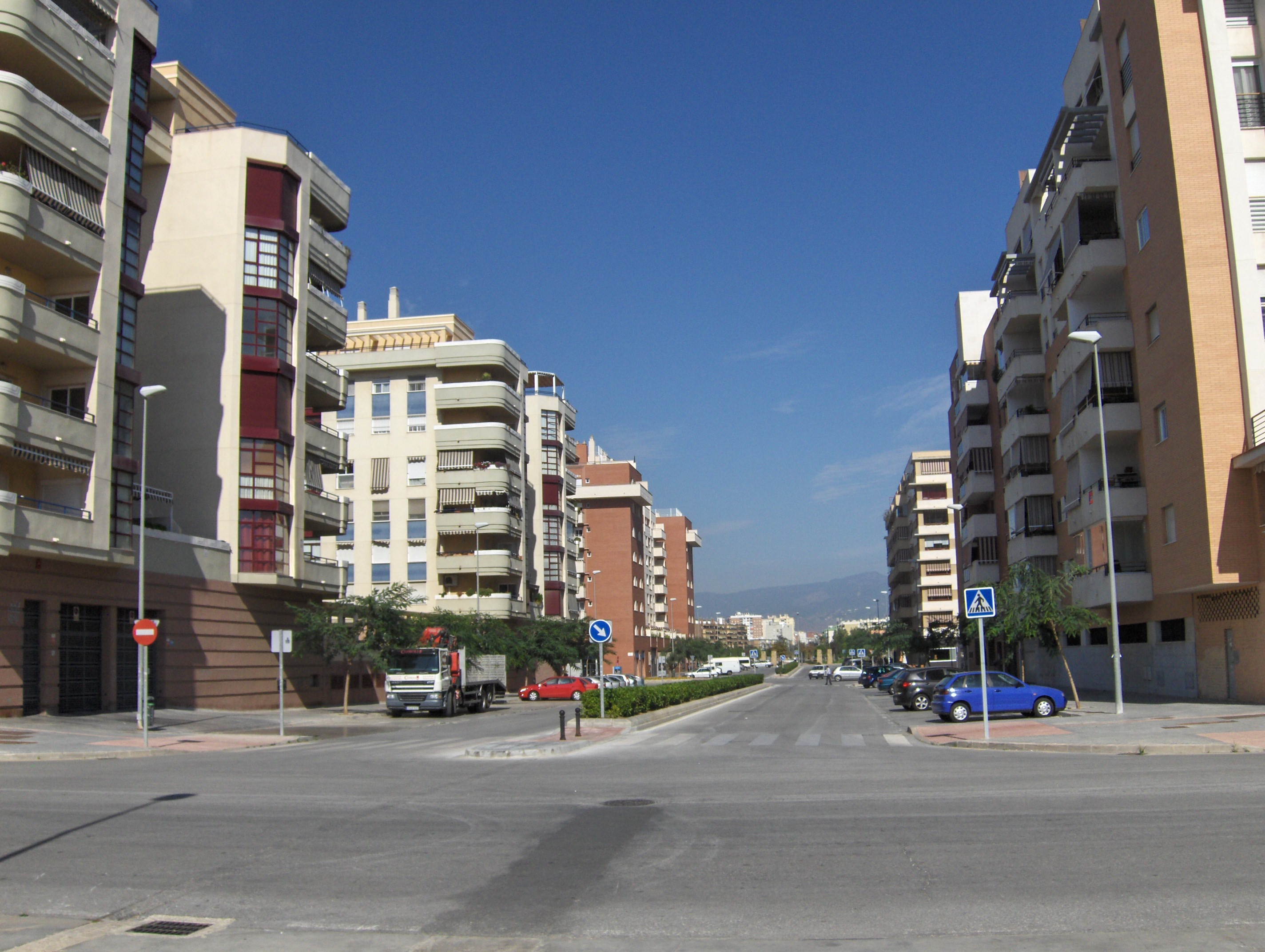
New residential developments in Finca El Pato.

After the González Edo Plan’s repeal, a new plan wasn’t approved until 1971. This expansive, desarrollista plan failed to address acute urban issues over eight years, weakened by the pre-democratic political-economic context.

=== 1983 PGOU ===
The 1983 plan analyzed issues inherited from two decades of rapid growth, identifying urban fabric fragmentation due to poor road systems, congestion, segregated areas lacking essential amenities, excessive land exploitation, heritage destruction, urban landscape degradation, industrial space conversion to residential, and middle-class flight to the periphery, aging the old town.

The plan focused on re-equipment, zoning, rationalizing the road system, and protecting heritage. Drafted by Salvador Moreno Peralta, José Seguí, and Damián Quero, it won the National Urban Planning Award of Spain and was Spain’s first democratic plan for a city over 100,000 inhabitants.

=== Historic Center Rehabilitation ===
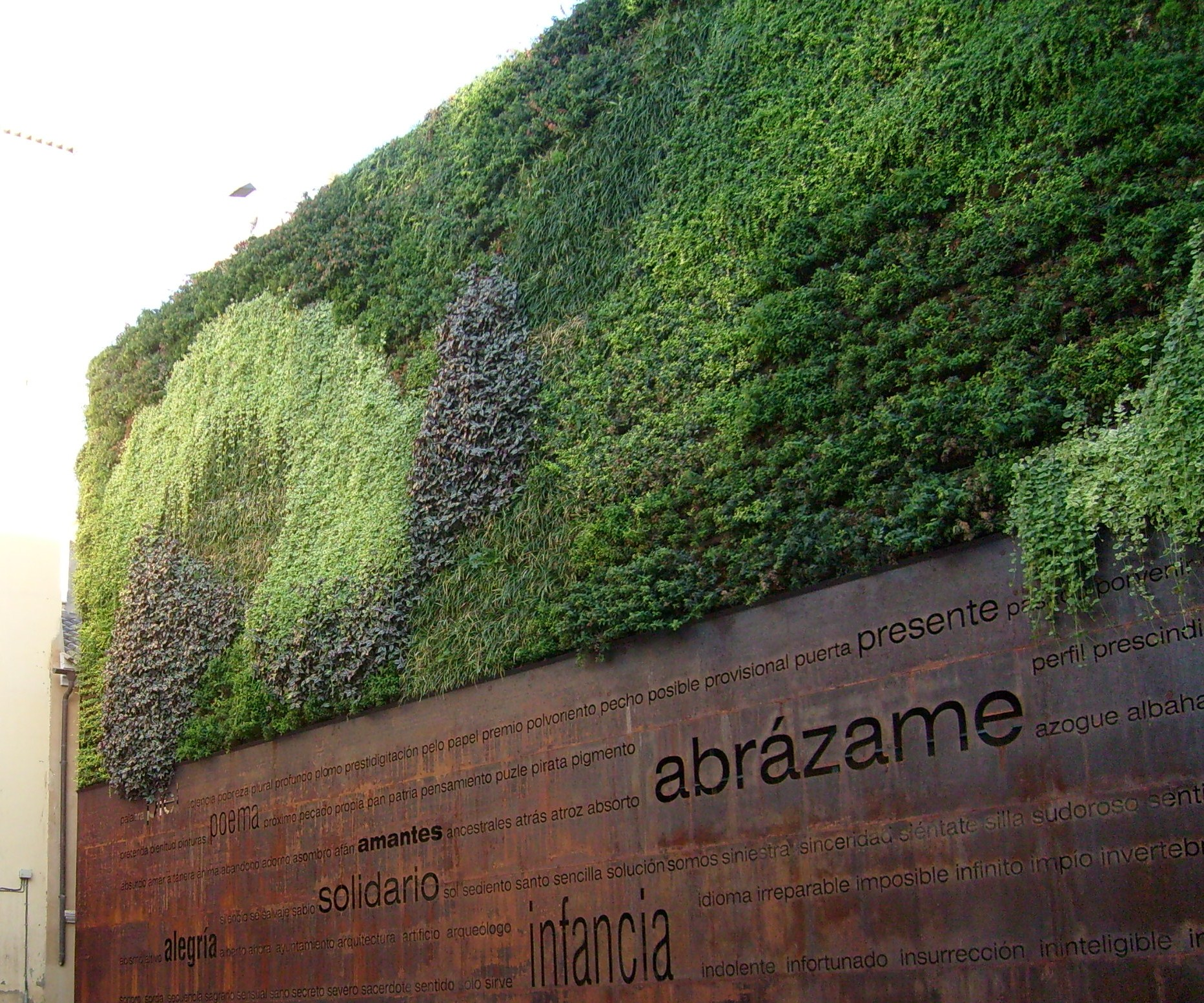
Vertical garden in the rehabilitated Plaza del Pericón.

A key focus of the 1983 plan was rehabilitating the historic center, introducing regulations on planning, construction, building use, and heights, with two protection levels for safeguarded structures. Two years later, the process began to declare the center a Bien de Interés Cultural, mandating a special protection plan under Spanish Heritage Law. The Special Protection and Internal Reform Plan (PEPRI) was approved in 1988.

=== 1996 PGOU and Metropolitan Planning ===
The 1996 General Urban Planning Plan continued these goals, launching metropolitan projects like the University City University City expansion and the Andalusia Technology Park, accelerating historic center rehabilitation, which showed significant urban decay. In 1995, the first metropolitan planning tool, the Urban Agglomeration of Málaga Territorial Planning Plan, was drafted, alongside public parks like Park of Huelin, North Park, and Parque del Oeste.

=== 1997–2007 Real Estate Boom ===
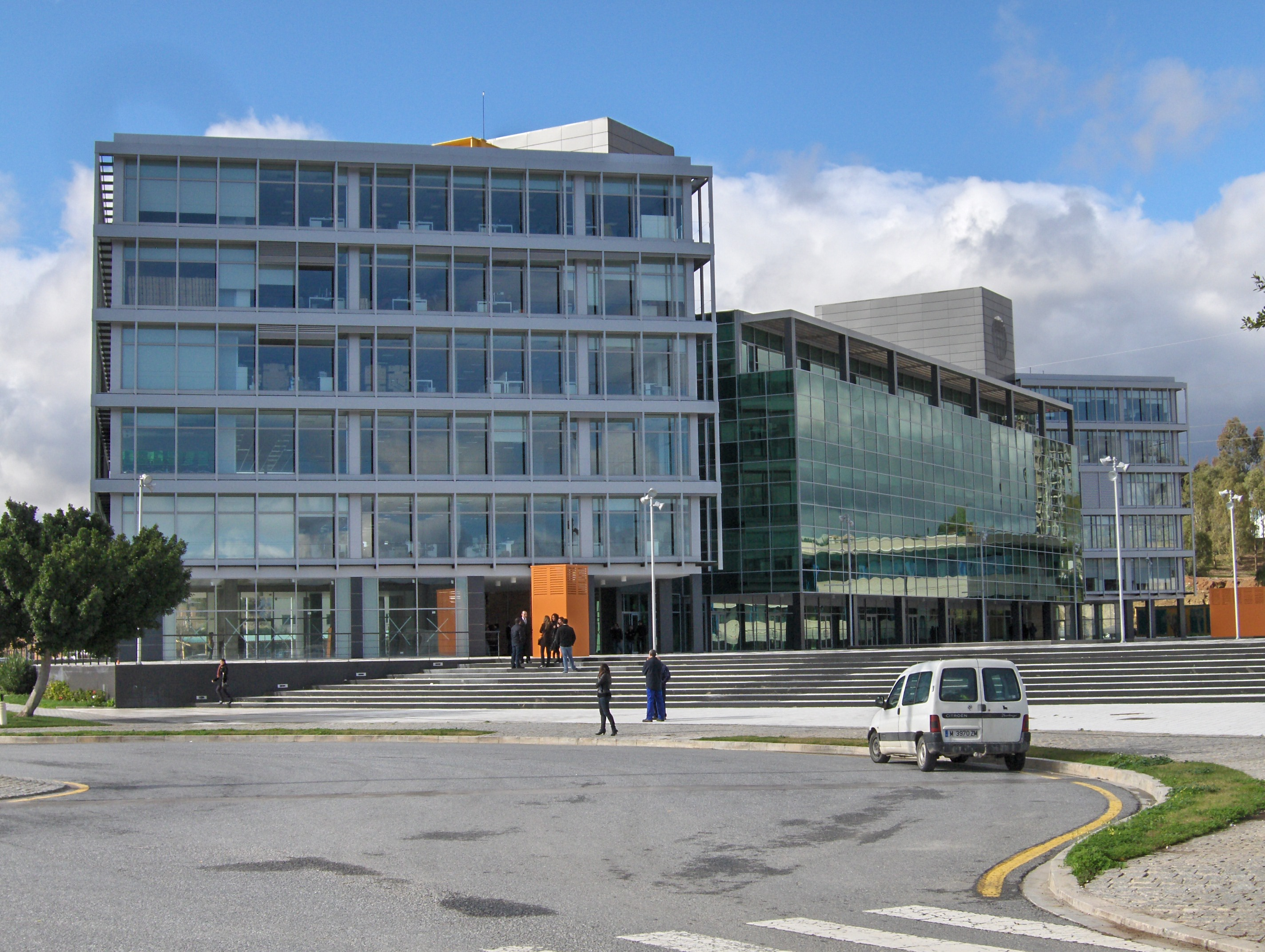
Building in the Andalusia Technology Park.

From 1997 to 2007, Málaga’s construction activity was intense, mirroring Spain’s, especially Mediterranean, real estate boom. Rising housing demand, fueled by immigration, pro-growth politics, and public belief in desarrollismo’s benefits, drove this period.

Urban growth in the 2000s was remarkable, adding 96,346 buildings, meaning over 25% of Málaga’s buildings in 2010 were 10 years old or less, surpassed only by Murcia among Spanish cities.

A 2008 study found Málaga had 9.2 m² of green space per inhabitant, half the European Union’s recommended amount. Of this, 53% comprised areas under 1,500 m², like plazas. Western neighborhoods like Carretera de Cádiz, Cruz del Humilladero, Carranque, and central areas like La Trinidad, Carlinda, and Miraflores de los Ángeles had the lowest green space ratios, while peripheral Campanillas, Churriana, Puerto de la Torre, and Este districts exceeded recommendations, reaching up to 30 m² per resident. The center averaged 13 m².

=== 2011 PGOU ===
This plan includes major projects like the Repsol Plan, set to shape the city’s future development.

A citizen-led initiative has materialized to create a cultural district, or Málaga Soho, in the central Ensanche, inspired by London and New York’s Soho districts. It involves regenerative actions and public space improvements.

The European Commission selected Málaga for its “best practices in urban development” receiving Urban Funds in 2007–2013, alongside San Sebastián, the only large Spanish cities chosen.

== See also ==
- Urban planning of Barcelona
- Urban planning of Miranda de Ebro

== Bibliography ==
- Candau, Mª Eugenia; Díaz Pardo, José Ignacio; Rodríguez Marín, Francisco (2005). Málaga Guía de Arquitectura [Málaga Architecture Guide] (in Spanish) (Bilingual, 1st. ed.). Seville: Consejería de Obras Públicas y Transportes, Málaga - Colegio de Arquitectos.
- Reinoso Bellido, Rafael; Rubio, Alfredo; Dragón, Jorge (2010). Las casas baratas de Málaga, 1911-1936 (16 ed.). Málaga. ISBN 978-84-614-4329-1.
- Urban Environment Observatory: Málaga '05, Agenda 21, Toward the Sustainable City.
