= Districts of Málaga =

Administrative units of Málaga, Spain

The city of Málaga (Spain) is governed and administered by the Ayuntamiento de Málaga (Málaga Council). It is divided in 10 municipal districts, coordinated by Juntas de Distrito, which are subdivided in wards (barrios) and industrial parks:

Nº	District/ Population	Wards
1	Centro; 84.988	Barcenillas, Campos Elíseos, Cañada de los Ingleses, Capuchinos, Centro Histórico, Conde de Ureña, Cristo de la Epidemia, El Bulto, El Ejido, El Molinillo, Ensanche del Centro, Explanada de la Estación, La Aurora, La Goleta, La Manía, La Merced, La Trinidad, La Victoria, Lagunillas, Los Antonios, Mármoles, Olletas, Parque Ayala, Perchel Norte, Perchel Sur, Plaza de Toros Vieja, Polígono Alameda, RENFE, San Miguel, Santa Amalia, Segalerva, Sierra Blanquilla, Ventaja Alta. Other areas: Monte de Gibralfaro^{3}, Camino del Colmenar^{1}, Puerto^{5}, Seminario^{3}.
2	Este; 67.289	Baños del Carmen, Bellavista, Castillo de Santa Catalina, Cerrado de Calderón, Clavero, Echeverría del Palo, El Candado, El Chanquete, El Drago, El Limonar, El Mayorazgo, El Morlaco, El Palo, El Polvorín, El Rocío, Hacienda Clavero, Hacienda Miramar, Hacienda Paredes, Jarazmín, La Araña, La Caleta, La Malagueta, La Mosca, La Pelusa, La Pelusilla, La Torrecilla, La Vaguada, La Viña, Las Acacias, Las Cuevas, Las Palmeras, Lomas de San Antón, Los Pinos del Limonar, Miraflores, Miraflores Alto, Miraflores del Palo, Miramar, Miramar del Palo, Monte Sancha, Olías, Parque Clavero, Pedregalejo, Pedregalejo Playa, Peinado Grande, Pinares de San Antón, Playa Virginia, Playas del Palo, Podadera, San Francisco, San Isidro, Santa Paula Miramar, Torre de San Telmo, Valle de los Galanes, Villa Cristina, Virgen de las Angustias. Industrial parks: Fábrica de Cemento. Other areas: Camino de Olías^{1}, Colinas del Limonar^{1}, El Lagarillo^{1}, Finca El Candado, Las Niñas^{1}, Parque del Morlaco^{3}.
3	Ciudad Jardín; 37.769	Alegría de la Huerta, Ciudad Jardín, Cortijo Bazán, Hacienda Los Montes, Herrera Oria, Huerta Nueva, Jardín de Málaga, Jardín Virginia, Las Flores, Los Casinis, Los Cipreses, Los Naranjos, Los Viveros, Mangas Verdes, Monte Dorado, Parque del Sur, Sagrada Familia, San José. Other areas: Finca la Concepción^{3}, Finca San José^{3}.
4	Bailén-Miraflores; 62.834	Arroyo del Cuarto, Camino de Suárez, Carlinda, Florisol, Gamarra, Granja Suárez, Haza del Campillo, La Alcubilla, La Bresca, La Corta, La Encarnación, La Florida, La Trinidad, Las Chapas, Los Castillejos, Los Millones, Miraflores de los Ángeles, Nueva Málaga, Parque Victoria Eugenia, Pavero, San Alberto, San Martín, Suárez, Tejar de Salyt, Victoria Eugenia. Industrial parks: Industrial San Alberto. Other areas: Hospital Carlos Haya^{6}, Parque del Norte^{3}.
5	Palma-Palmilla; 29.862	26 de Febrero, 503 Viviendas, Arroyo de los Ángeles, Huerta La Palma, La Palma, La Palmilla, La Roca, La Rosaleda, Las Virreinas, Martiricos, Virreina, Virreina Alta. Other areas: Parque Las Virreinas^{1}.
6	Cruz de Humilladero; 93.955	4 de Diciembre, Arroyo del Cuarto, Camino de Antequera, Carranque, Cortijo Alto, Cortijo de Torres, Cruz del Humilladero, El Duende, Haza Cuevas, La Asunción, La Barriguilla, La Unión, Las Chapas, Los Prados, Los Tilos, Mármoles, Nuestra Señora del Carmen, Núcleo General Franco, Polígono Carretera de Cártama, Portada Alta, San Rafael, Santa Cristina, Santa Julia, Santa Marta, Teatinos, Tiro de Pichón, San José del Viso, Intelhorce, Sánchez Blanca. Polígonos industriales: Industrial Alcalde Díaz Zafra, Industrial Siemens, Polígono Industrial La Estrella, Polígono Industrial Ronda Exterior. Otros sectores: Cementerio San Rafael, Estación de Los Prados^{5}, La Estación^{6}, Recinto Ferial Cortijo de Torres^{6}.
7	Carretera de Cádiz; 113.424	25 Años de Paz, Alaska, Almudena, Ardira, Ave María, Barceló, Cortijo Vallejo, Dos Hermanas, El Higueral, El Torcal, Girón, Guadaljaire, Haza de la Pesebrera, Haza Honda, Huelin, Jardín de la Abadía, La Luz, La Paz, La Princesa, Las Delicias, Los Girasoles, Los Guindos, Mainake, Nuevo San Andrés 1, Nuevo San Andrés 2, Pacífico, Parque Ayala, Parque Mediterráneo, Puerta Blanca, Regio, Sacaba Beach, San Andrés, San Carlos, San Carlos Condote, Santa Isabel, Santa Paula, Sixto, Tabacalera, Torres de la Serna, Virgen de Belén, Vistafranca. Industrial parks: Industrial La Cordobesa, Industrial La Térmica, Industrial Nuevo San Andrés, Polígono Industrial Carranza, Polígono Industrial Guadaljaire, Polígono Industrial Los Guindos, Polígono Industrial Ronda Exterior. Other areas: Málaga 2000^{4}, Minerva^{1}, Palacio de Deportes^{6}, Polígono Comercial Valdicio^{4}, Torre del Río^{1}.
8	Churriana; 20.449	Buenavista, Cañada de Ceuta, Churriana, Cortijo de Mazas, El Cuartón, El Higueral, El Olivar, Finca La Hacienda, Finca Monsálvez, Guadalmar, Hacienda Platero, Heliomar, La Casita de Madera, La Cizaña, La Noria, La Tosca, Las Pedrizas, Los Jazmines, Los Paredones, Los Rosales, Los Paseros, Lourdes, San Fernando, San Jerónimo, San Juan-El Albaricocal, San Julián, Vega de Oro, Wittenberg. Industrial parks: Cortijo San Julián, Polígono Industrial Aeropuerto, Polígono Industrial El Álamo, Polígono Industrial El Tarajal, Polígono Industrial Guadalhorce, Polígono Industrial Haza de la Cruz, Polígono Industrial KM.239 Ctra. N-340, Polígono Industrial Mi Málaga, Polígono Industrial Santa Bárbara, Polígono Industrial Santa Cruz, Polígono Industrial Santa Teresa, Polígono Industrial Villa Rosa. Other areas: Aeropuerto Base Aérea^{5}, Arraijanal, Butano^{5}, Campamento Benítez, Cementerio Churriana, Centro de Ocio^{4}, Campo de Golf, Cortijo San Isidro^{2}, Depuradora Guadalhorce^{5}, El Retiro^{1}, La Azucarera, Los Chochales, Makro^{4}, Parque del Guadalhorce^{3}, Pizarrillo^{1}, Polígono Comercial Guadalhorce^{4}, Rojas, Santa Tecla.
9	Campanillas; 17.472	Campanillas, Castañetas, Colmenarejo, El Brillante, El Prado, El Tarajal, Estación de Campanillas, Huertecilla Mañas, La Fábrica, Las Manseras, Loma del Campo, Los Asperones 2, Los Chopos, Maqueda, Oliveros, Pilar del Prado, Roquero, Santa Águeda, Santa Rosalía, Segovia, Vallejo. Industrial parks: Amoniaco, Centro de Transporte de Mercacías, Industrial Intelhorce, Industrial Pilar del Prado, Parque Industrial Trevénez, Polígono Industrial La Huertecilla. Other areas: Ampliación de la Ciudad Universitaria^{6}, Mercamálaga^{4}, Miranda, Parque Cementerio, Parque Tecnológico.
10	Puerto de la Torre; 49.442	Arroyo España, Cañada de los Cardos, Ciudad Santa Inés, Colonia Santa Inés, El Atabal, El Chaparral, El Cónsul, El Cónsul 2, El Cortijuelo-Junta de los Caminos, El Limonero, El Romeral, El Tejar, El Tomillar, Finca La Palma, Fuente Alegre, Hacienda Bizcochero, Hacienda Cabello, Hacienda Capitán, Hacienda Roldán, Huerta Nueva-Puerto de la Torre, Las Morillas, Las Morillas 2, Las Morillas-Puerto de la Torre, Los Almendros, Los Asperones 1 y 3, Los Molinos, Los Morales, Los Morales 1, Los Morales 2, Los Ramos, Los Tomillares, Orozco, Puertosol, Quinta Alegre, Salinas, Santa Isabel-Puerto de la Torre, Torre Atalaya, Torremar, Virgen del Carmen. Other areas: Cañaveral^{1}, Ciudad Universitaria^{6}, Soliva Este^{1}, Soliva Norte^{1}, Universidad Laboral^{6}.

The 10 districts.

== Notes ==
^{1} Neighbourhood planned or under construction.
^{2} Former neighbourhood demolished to extend the airport.
^{3} Green area.
^{4} Commercial complex.
^{5} Infrastructures.
^{6} Public facilities.
