= Salvador Moreno =

Salvador Moreno may refer to:

- Salvador Moreno Fernández (1886–1966), Spanish admiral and politician
- Salvador Moreno Manzano (1916–1999), Mexican composer, painter, and art historian
- Salvador Moreno Peralta (born 1947), Spanish architect and planner, participated in the urban planning of Málaga
