= Montes de Málaga =

Mountain range in Málaga Province, Andalusia, Spain

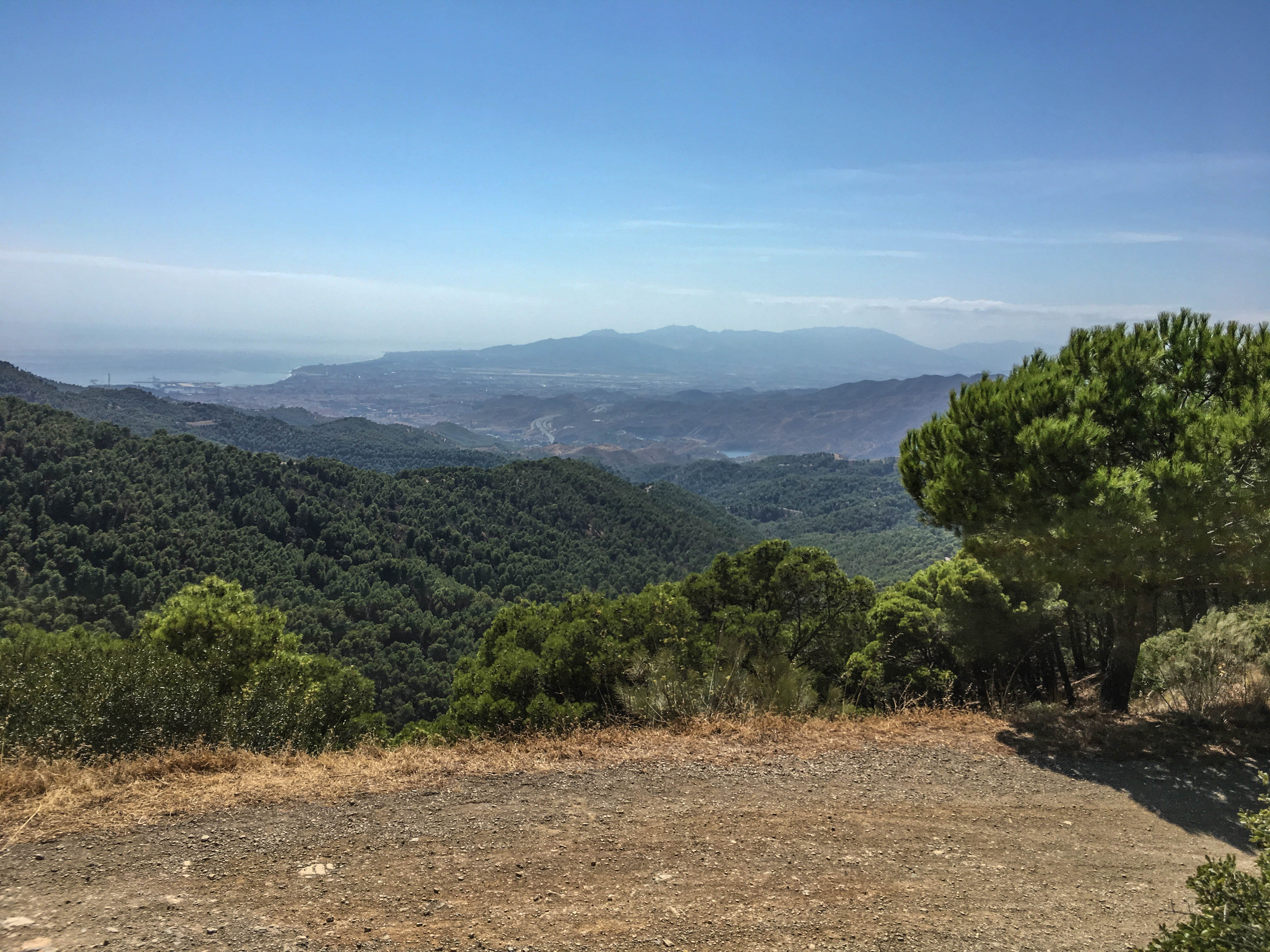
- Mirador del Cochino

Highest point
- Peak: Cresta de la Reina
- Elevation: 1,030 m (3,380 ft)
- Coordinates: 36°49′0″N 04°23′0″W

Geography
- Location within Province of Málaga Location within Spain
- Location: Málaga Province, Andalusia
- Country: Spain
- Parent range: Penibaetic System

Geology
- Mountain type: Limestone

Montes de Málaga is a mountain range of the Penibaetic System in Málaga Province, Andalusia, Spain. Its highest point is the 1,030 m high Cresta de la Reina peak. Other notable peaks are San Antón, Coronado, Monte Victoria and Gibralfaro.

The range is named after Málaga City located at its base.

== Geography ==
This mountain range extends between the Guadalhorce valley to the west and the Axarquía in the east. To the north the Corredor de Periana valley separates it from the Cordillera Antequerana and to the south lies the Mediterranean Sea.

River Guadalmedina flows through the Montes de Málaga. It is a river subject to high seasonal variations and has five well defined tributaries which have their sources in this range, the Arroyo de las Vacas, Arroyo Chaperas, Arroyo Humaina, Arroyo Hondo and Arroyo de Los Frailes. All of these rivers are dry most of the year. Located in the mountains, the Limonero Dam on the Guadalmedina provides water for the area.

Part of the area of the Montes de Málaga is a protected area under the name Montes de Málaga Natural Park located within the range.

== See also ==
- Baetic System
- Montes de Málaga Natural Park
- Urban planning of Málaga
