= Este (Málaga) =

- District of Málaga
- Country: Spain
- Aut. community: Andalusia
- Municipality: Málaga

Area
  - Total: 126.63 km^{2} (48.89 sq mi)

Population
  - Total: 67,289
  - Density: 531.38/km^{2} (1,376.3/sq mi)
- Postal code: 28032
- Málaga district number: 2
- Address of council: Calle Martínez Falero 34, 29018

Este (Spanish for East), also known as District 2 and Málaga-Este, is one of the 11 districts of the city of Málaga, Spain.

== Barrios ==
It comprises de following wards (barrios):

- Baños del Carmen
- Bellavista
- Camino de Olías
- Castillo de Santa Catalina
- Cerrado de Calderón
- Colinas del Limonar
- Echeverría del Palo
- El Candado
- El Chanquete
- El Drago
- El Lagarillo
- El Limonar
- El Mayorazgo
- El Morlaco
- El Palo
- El Polvorín
- El Rocío
- Fábrica de Cemento
- Finca Clavero
- Finca El Candado
- Hacienda Clavero
- Hacienda Miramar
- Hacienda Paredes
- Jarazmín
- La Araña
- La Caleta
- La Malagueta
- La Mosca
- La Pelusa
- La Pelusilla
- La Torrecilla
- La Vaguada
- La Viña
- Las Acacias
- Las Cuevas
- Las Niñas
- Las Palmeras
- Lomas de San Antón
- Los Pinos del Limonar
- Miraflores
- Miraflores Alto
- Miraflores del Palo
- Miramar
- Monte Sancha
- Olías
- Parque Clavero
- Parque del Morlaco
- Pedregalejo
- Pedregalejo Playa
- Peinado Grande
- Pinares de San Antón
- Playa Virginia
- Playas del Palo
- Podadera
- San Francisco
- San Isidro
- Santa Paula Miramar
- Torre de San Telmo
- Valle de los Galanes
- Villa Cristina
- Virgen de las Angustias
