= Palma-Palmilla =

Coordinates: 36°44′10″N 4°26′26″W

- District of Málaga
- Country: Spain
- Aut. community: Andalusia
- Municipality: Málaga

Area
  - Total: 25.37 km^{2} (9.80 sq mi)

Population
  - Total: 29,862
  - Density: 1,177/km^{2} (3,049/sq mi)
- Málaga district number: 5
- Address of council: Calle Doctor Gálvez Moll 11, 29011

Palma-Palmilla, also known as District 5, is one of the 11 districts of the city of Málaga, Spain.

It comprises the wards (barrios) of 26 de Febrero, 503 Viviendas, Arroyo de los Ángeles, Huerta La Palma, La Palma, La Palmilla, La Roca, La Rosaleda, Las Virreinas, Martiricos, Parque Las Virreinas, Virreina, and Virreina Alta.
