= Bailén-Miraflores =

Coordinates: 36.7365°N 4.4542°W

- District of Málaga
- Country: Spain
- Aut. community: Andalusia
- Municipality: Málaga

Area
  - Total: 6.93 km^{2} (2.68 sq mi)

Population
  - Total: 62,834
  - Density: 9,066.96/km^{2} (23,483.3/sq mi)
- Postal code: 28032
- Málaga district number: 4
- Address of council: Plaza Bailén 11, 29009

Bailén-Miraflores, also known as District 4, is one of the 11 districts of the city of Málaga, Spain.

It comprises the following wards (barrios):

1. Arroyo del Cuarto
2. Arroyo de los Ángeles
3. Camino de Suárez
4. Carlinda
5. Carlos Haya
6. Florisol
7. Gamarra
8. Granja Suárez
9. Haza del Campillo
10. Industrial San Alberto
11. La Alcubilla
12. La Bresca
13. La Corta
14. La Encarnación
15. La Florida
16. La Trinidad
17. Las Chapas
18. Los Castillejos
19. Los Millones
20. Miraflores de los Ángeles
21. Nueva Málaga
22. Parque del Norte
23. Parque Victoria Eugenia
24. Pavero
25. San Alberto
26. San Martín
27. Suárez
28. Tejar de Salyt
29. Victoria Eugenia
