= Montes de Málaga Natural Park =

Natural park in Andalusia, Spain

Coordinates: 36°50′00″N 4°22′00″W

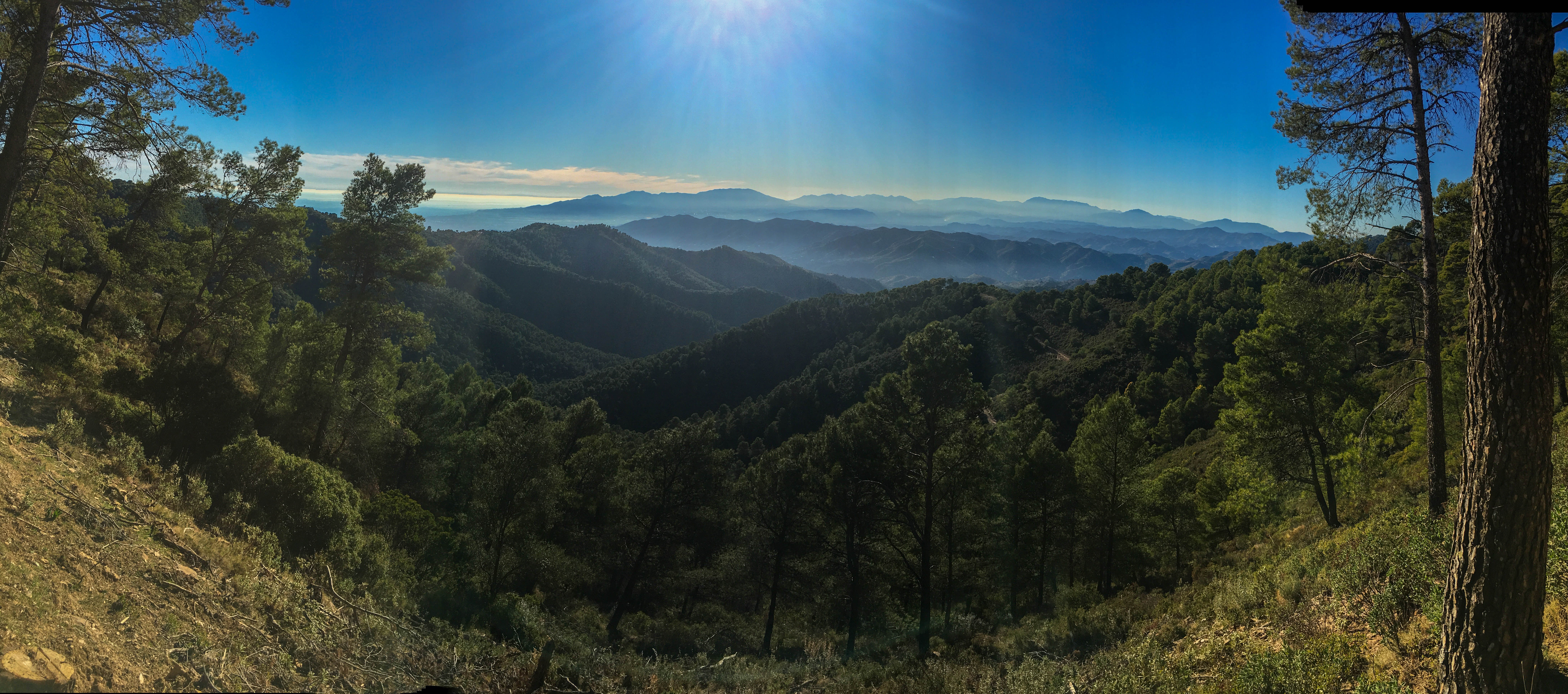
- Interactive map of Montes de Málaga Natural Park
- Location: Málaga, Spain
- Nearest city: Málaga
- Area: 49.9
- Established: 1989
- Governing body: Junta de Andalucia

Montes de Málaga Natural Park (Spanish: Parque Natural Montes de Málaga) is the name of a natural park in Andalusia, Spain. It is named after the Montes de Málaga range located near Málaga city and was established in 1989.

== Description ==
The park lies at the heart of the Montes de Málaga coastal mountain range. The Guadalmedina river that runs through Málaga, crosses the park area which includes small valleys cut by the Guadalmedina's tributaries

The vegetation is dominated by shrubland with Pistacia lentiscus and Arbutus unedo. The most characteristic tree species are pines, including the stone pine and Monterrey pine. Other trees found in the area are Algerian oak, cork oak, scarlet oak, olive tree and carob tree.

The animals in the protected area include the genet, badger, fox, ocellated lizard, Andalusian wall lizard, Mediterranean chameleon and the Iberian ribbed newt. There are also birds of prey such as the eagle, Eurasian sparrowhawk and northern goshawk.

== Ethnographic Museum ==
There is also the Ethnographic Museum (Museo Etnográfico) in an old farm in Torrijos, within the park area.
