= Alameda Principal =

Major street in Málaga (Spain)

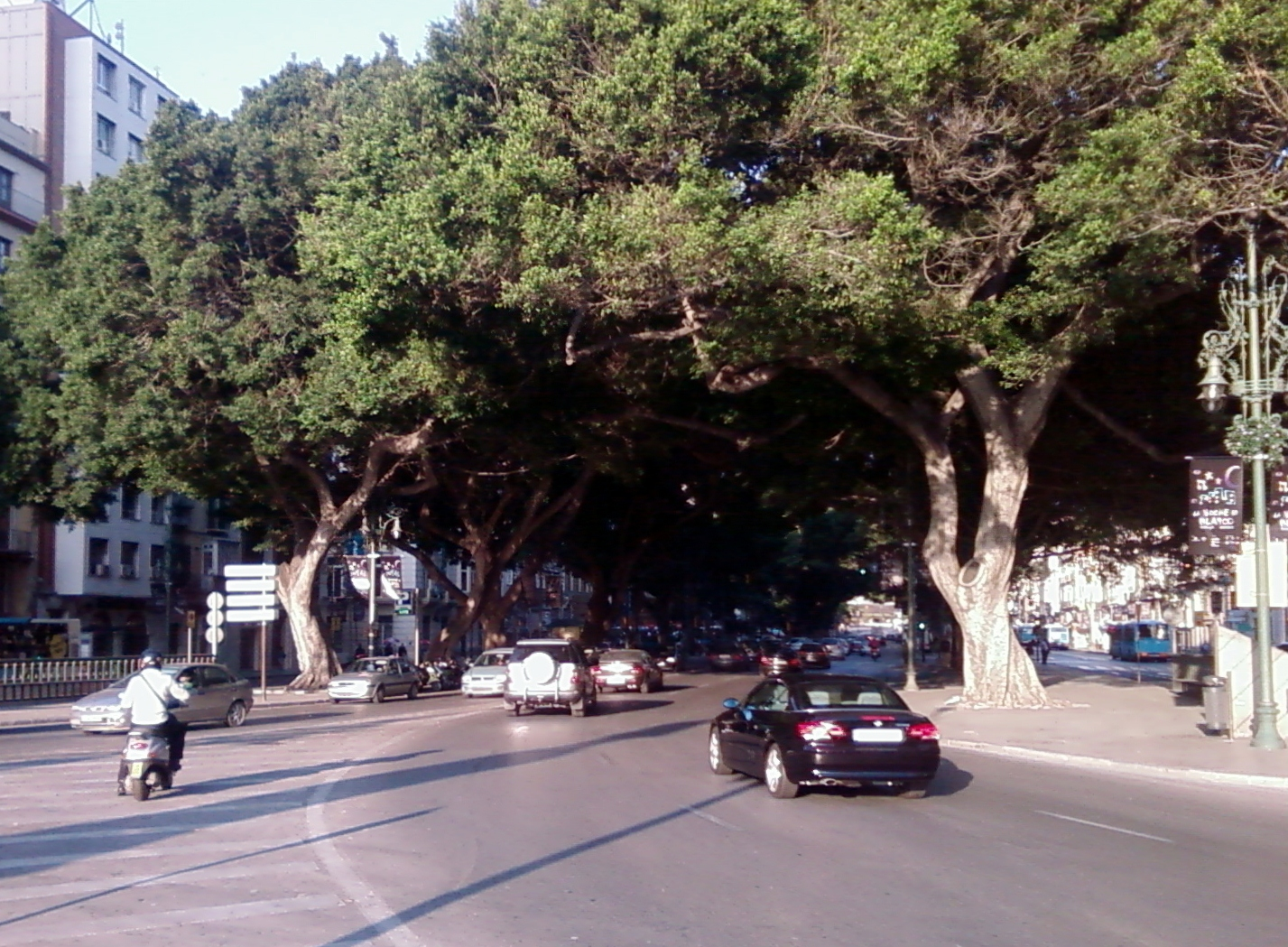
- Interactive map of Alameda Principal
- Type: street
- Length: 350 m (1,150 ft)
- Location: Málaga, Spain
- West end: Guadalmedina
- East end: Plaza de La Marina

Alameda Principal, commonly known as La Alameda is a major street in Málaga, Spain. It is one of the most important streets of the city. Located in the center of Malaga, it is the backbone of its east and west.

== History ==
In what is now the north sidewalk of the Alameda, the medieval defensive walls were located until the 18th century. As a consequence of the sedimentation of new lands brought by the Guadalmedina river, the so-called sandbank was formed between the walls and the port, for that reason this new space advanced towards the sea was approved by the Court, thanks to the intervention of the family, Unzaga-St. Maxent.

Between 1786 and 1793, Luis de Unzaga y Amézaga, president of the Board of royal works of the port of Malaga and governor of the General Command of the coasts of the Emirate of Granada, which then included Malaga, coordinated various military engineers such as José Carrión de Mula and Bartolomé Molina, commander of revenues for the construction of the first rows of houses, starting from the north. For its trees, Luis de Unzaga ordered to bring trees, some from the mountains of Malaga and others that would come through the port, thus configuring itself as a tree-lined promenade with noble houses and mansions, including that of the governor Luis de Unzaga.

In 1925, it was opened to the public under the name of "Avenida de Alfonso XIII". During the Franco regime, it was renamed "Avenida del Generalísimo" and some of the buildings that mark its current appearance were built, as well as its extension to the other side of the river by the Tetuán bridge in 1966.
