= Ciudad Jardín (Málaga) =

Coordinates: 36.74959698°N 4.41855545°W

- District of Málaga
- Country: Spain
- Aut. community: Andalusia
- Municipality: Málaga

Area
  - Total: 76.21 km^{2} (29.42 sq mi)

Population
  - Total: 37,769
  - Density: 495.59/km^{2} (1,283.6/sq mi)
- Postal code: 28032
- Málaga district number: 3
- Address of council: Calle Alcalde Nicolás Maroto 18, 29014

Ciudad Jardín (Spanish for Garden City), also known as District 3, is one of the 11 districts of the city of Málaga, Spain.

It comprises de following wards (barrios): Alegría de la Huerta, Ciudad Jardín, Cortijo Bazán, Finca La Concepción, Finca San José, Hacienda Los Montes, Herrera Oria, Huerta Nueva, Jardín de Málaga, Jardín Virginia, Las Flores, Los Casinis, Los Cipreses, Los Naranjos, Los Viveros, Mangas Verdes, Monte Dorado, Parque del Sur, Sagrada Familia and San José.
