= Campanillas =

Coordinates: 36.7490°N 4.5521°W

- District of Málaga
- Country: Spain
- Aut. community: Andalusia
- Municipality: Málaga

Area
  - Total: 59.77 km^{2} (23.08 sq mi)

Population
  - Total: 17,472
  - Density: 292.32/km^{2} (757.1/sq mi)
- Málaga district number: 9
- Address of council: Calle Ramírez Arcas 2, 29590

Campanillas, also known as District 9, is one of the 11 districts of the city of Málaga, Spain.

It comprises the wards (barrios) of Amoníaco, Campanillas, Castañetas, Centro de Transporte de Mercancías, Colmenarejo, El Brillante, El Prado, El Tarajal, Estación de Campanillas, Parque Industrial Trévenez, Huertecilla Mañas, Industrial Intelhorce, Industrial Pilar del Prado, La Estación, La Fábrica, Las Manseras, Loma del Campo, Los Asperones 2, Los Chopos, Maqueda, Mercamálaga, Miranda, Oliveros, Parque Cementerio, Parque Tecnológico, Pilar del Prado, Polígono Industrial La Huertecilla, Roquero, Santa Águeda, Santa Rosalía, Segovia, Vallejo.
