= Andalusia Technology Park =

Parque Tecnológico de Andalucía (PTA)
- Location within Spain
- Coordinates: 36°43′55.64″N 4°33′46″W
- Country: Spain
- Autonomous Community: Andalusia
- Province: Málaga
- City: Málaga
- Time zone: UTC+1 (CET)
  - Summer (DST): CEST
- Postcode: 29590
- Calling code: +34 (Spain) 95 (Malaga)
- Website: http://www.pta.es

The Andalusia Technology Park (Spanish: Parque Tecnológico de Andalucía, PTA) in Málaga is a small science park.

The Parque Tecnológico de Andalucía was conceived as a technological nucleus to stimulate industry in Andalusia. This complex is one of the most important economic centres in the south of Spain, with 715 companies and 27,940 employees in 2024.

The sectors with the greatest presence at the PTA are: Information Technology (Electronics, Information, Computing and Telecommunications) together with Engineering, Consultancy and Advisory services. Most of the companies are focused on information technology, telecommunications, and research and development. They include some multinationals such as Oracle, Ericsson, IBM, TDK, Ciklum, CGI, Accenture and Huawei.

PTA is one of the most important technological parks in southern Europe and since 1995, the world headquarters of the International Association of Science Parks (IASP).

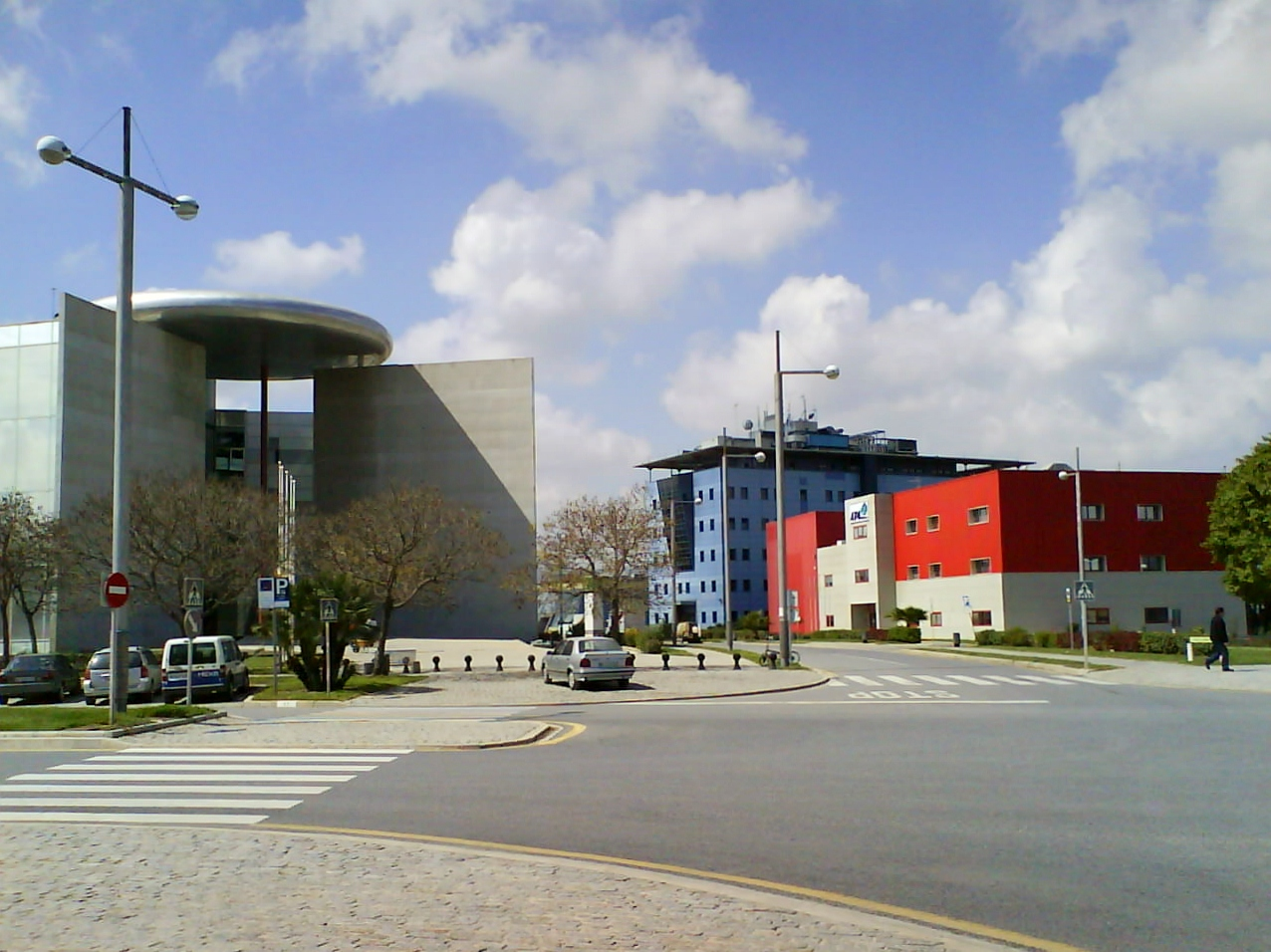

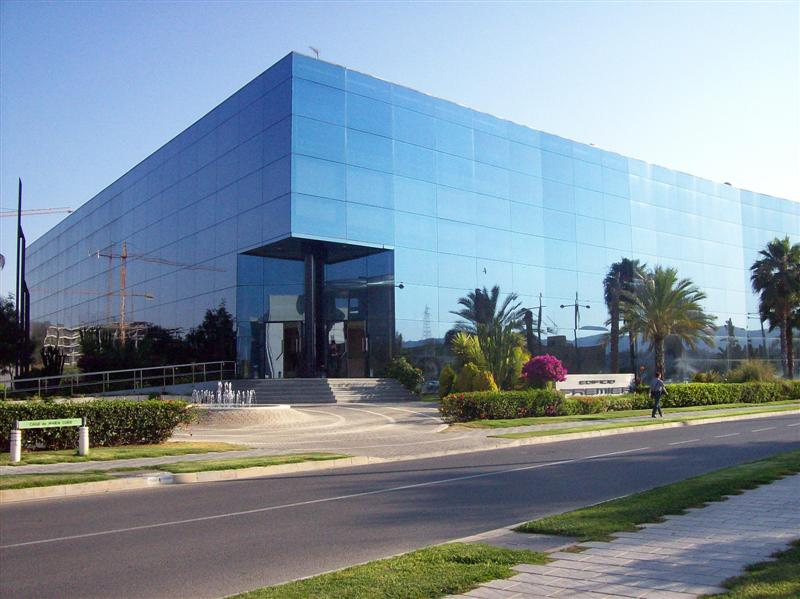

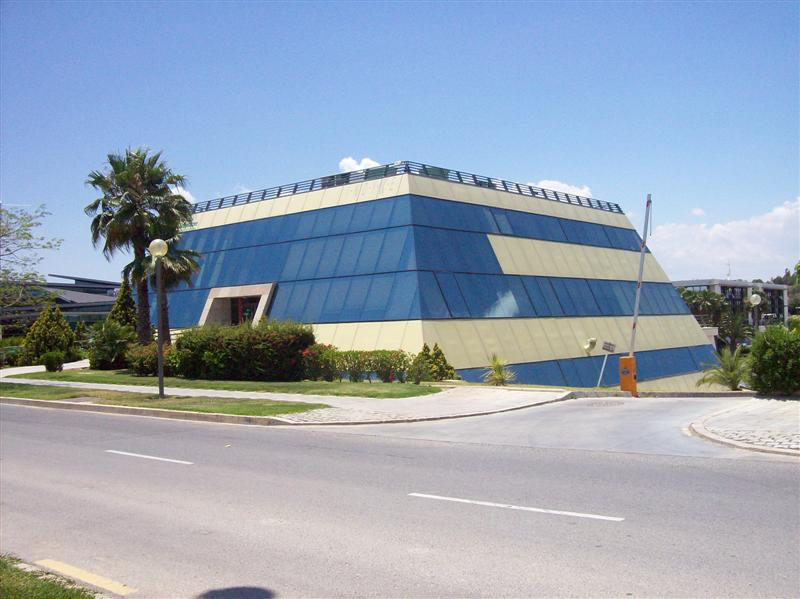

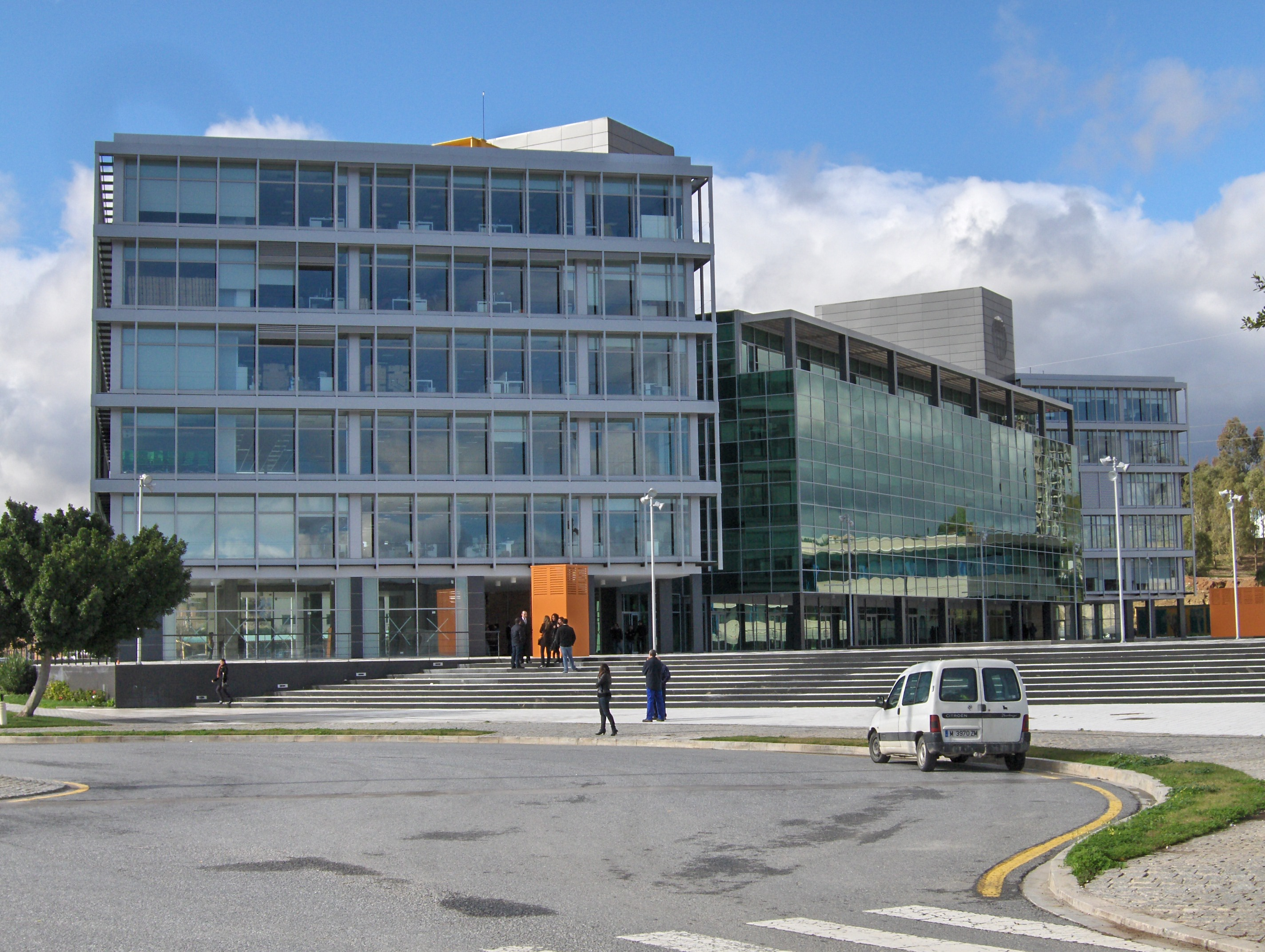
