= Puerto de la Torre =

- District of Málaga
- Country: Spain
- Aut. community: Andalusia
- Municipality: Málaga

Area
  - Total: 42.26 km^{2} (16.32 sq mi)

Population
  - Total: 49,442
  - Density: 1,169.95/km^{2} (3,030.2/sq mi)
- Málaga district number: 10
- Address of council: Calle Víctor Hugo 1, 29190

Puerto de la Torre, also known as District 10, is one of the 11 districts of the city of Málaga, Spain.

It comprises the wards (barrios) of Arroyo España, Cañada de los Cardos, Cañaveral, El Atabal, El Chaparral, El Cortijuelo-Junta de los Caminos, El Limonero, El Tejar, El Tomillar, Hacienda Cabello, Hacienda Roldán, Huerta Nueva-Puerto de la Torre, Las Morillas 2, Las Morillas-Puerto de la Torre, Los Almendros, Los Asperones 1 y 3, Los Molinos, Los Morales, Los Morales 1, Los Morales 2, Los Ramos, Los Tomillares, Orozco, Puertosol, Quinta Alegre, Salinas, Santa Isabel-Puerto de la Torre, Soliva Este, Torremar, Universidad Laboral, Virgen del Carmen.
