= Guadalmedina =

River in Spain

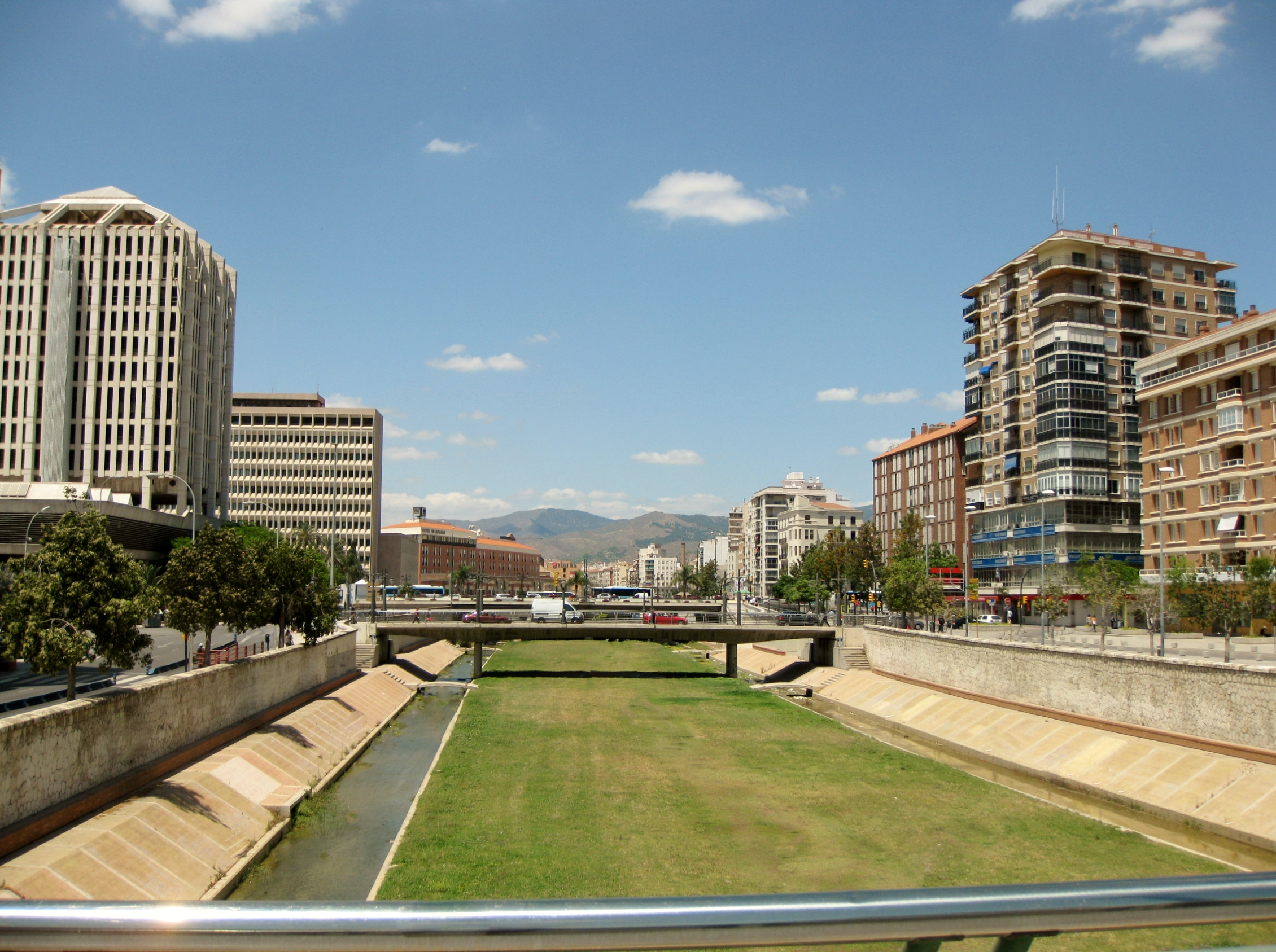
- The Guadalmedina in Málaga

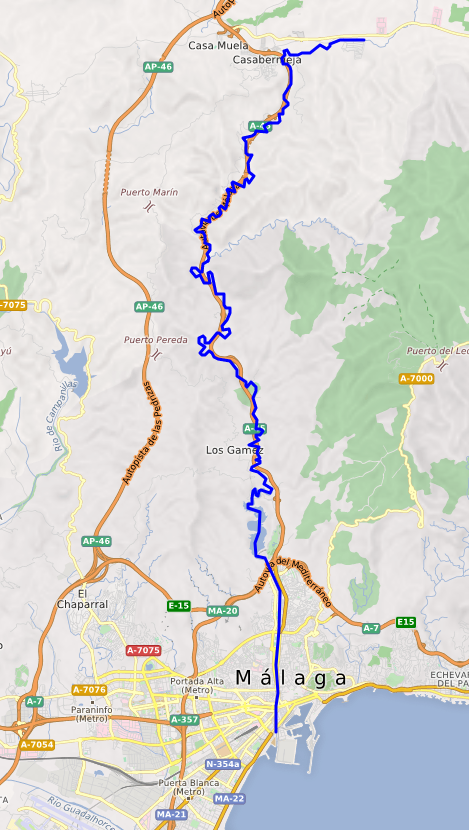
- Course of the Guadalmedina

Location
- Country: Spain

Physical characteristics
- Source
  - location: Sierra de Camarolos, Andalusia
- Mouth
  - location: Mediterranean Sea
  - coordinates: 36°42′23″N 4°25′33″W
  - elevation: 0 m (0 ft)
- Length: 47 kilometres (29 mi)

The Guadalmedina (from the Arabic وادي المدينة wādī l-madīna; lit. 'river of the city') is a river that runs through the city of Málaga, Spain. Historically, it has played an important role in the city's history, and has divided the city into two halves. The city's historic center is on its east bank.

== Course ==
The Guadalmedina has its source at the La Cruz Peak, in the Sierra de Camarolos mountain range, and it is 47 kilometres (29 mi) long. It reaches the Mediterranean in the center of the city of Málaga and flows through the Montes de Málaga Natural Park.

It is a river subject to high seasonal variations and has five well defined tributaries which have their sources in the Montes de Málaga range, the Arroyo de las Vacas, Arroyo Chaperas, Arroyo Humaina, Arroyo Hondo and Arroyo de Los Frailes. All of these rivers are dry most of the year. The Limonero Dam on the Guadalmedina provides water for the area.

== See also ==
- List of rivers of Spain
