= Plaza de toros de La Malagueta =

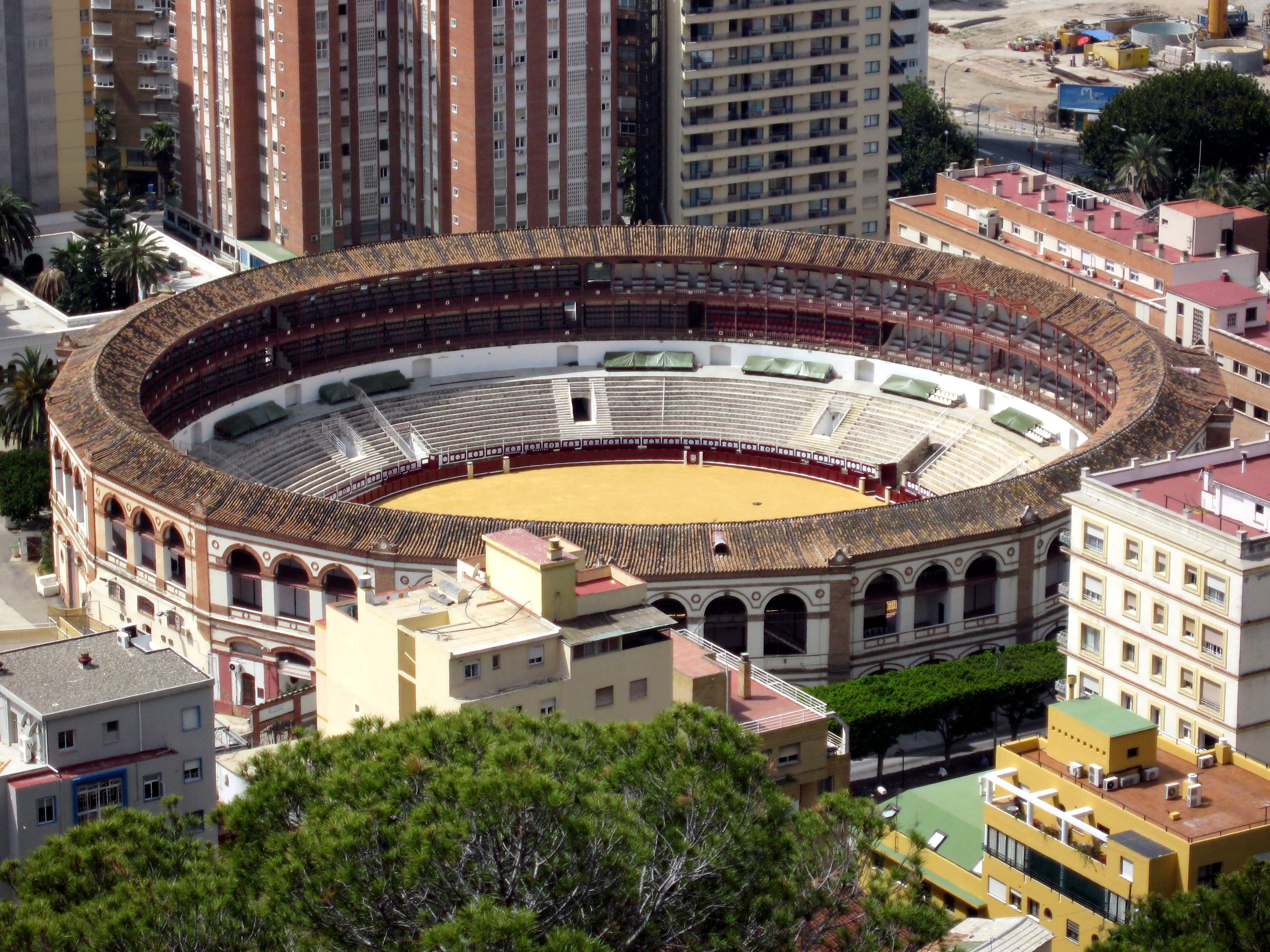
- La Malagueta in Málaga, 2008
- Interactive map of the Plaza de toros de La Malagueta area

General information
- Type: Bullring
- Architectural style: Neo-Mudéjar
- Location: Paseo Reding 8, Málaga, Spain
- Coordinates: 36°43′13.2″N 4°24′38.9″W
- Construction started: 1874
- Completed: 1876
- Inaugurated: June 11, 1876; 150 years ago

Dimensions
- Diameter: 52 m (171 ft)

Design and construction
- Architect: Joaquín Rucoba

Other information
- Seating capacity: 9,032

Website
- https://plazadetoroslamalagueta.com/

La Malagueta is a bullring at Málaga, Andalucía, Spain. It is located in the eastern district of Málaga, in its namesake neighbourhood of La Malagueta.

The first event was held in 1876.

The building is owned by the Provincial Deputation of Málaga.

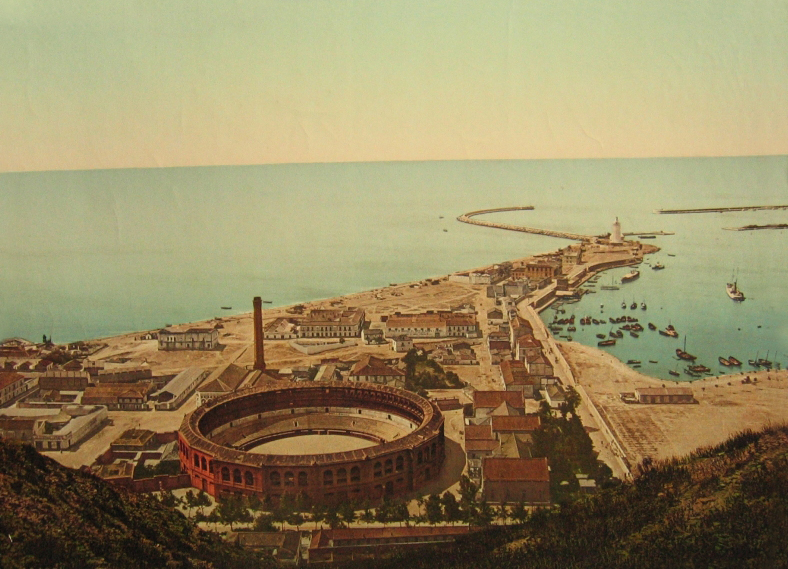
La Malagueta in 1900

== History ==
The bullring was designed by Joaquín Rucoba, who also designed the Mercado de Atarazanas. Construction work started on June 16, 1874. The work was interrupted from December 23, 1874, until October 10, 1875. It was inaugurated on June 11, 1876, with a traditional corrida de toros.

In 1939, during the last months of the Spanish Civil War, the concentration camp at La Aurora had been filling up. The regime decided to use the bullring to house prisoners. In 1943, during the Second World War, it was once again used to house prisoners.

In 1976, it was declared a Conjunto histórico. In 1981, it was also declared a Bien de Interés Cultural, meaning it was added to the list of national heritage sites.

A two-year renovation started in 2017. The inside of the building was adapted so that it could be used as a cultural centre year round, rather than only as a bullring.

== Building ==
The style of the building is Neo-Mudéjar and it takes the form of a 16-sided hexadecagon. After a refurbishment carried out in 2010 the arena now has a capacity for 9,032 spectators. The ring measures 52 meters in diameter and the complex includes four large pens, 10 small holding pens, stables, dressing rooms, a first aid post and assorted administrative facilities including the Museo Taurino Antonio Ordóñez museum.

La Malagueta hosts events during the Spanish-style bullfighting season, and its festivities include two bullfights in Holy Week which include the Corrida Picassiana (named in honour of Pablo Picasso). La Corrida de la Prensa (press) is held in June for the feast of Málaga town's duo of patron saints Ciriaco and Paula, who were martyred in Málaga in 303 AD. The bullring is also featured prominently during Feria de Agosto.

The August festival and final bullfight of the season is held in the month of September in honour of Our Lady of Victory, the patron saint of the Roman Catholic Diocese of Málaga.

== See also ==
- Spanish-style bullfighting
