= List of winners of Sección Especial of Falles =

Sección especial (Mayor)
- 1948- Plaza del Mercado
- 1949- Plaza del Mercado
- 1950- Plaza del Mercado
- 1951- Plaza del Mercado
- 1952- Plaza del Mercado
- 1953- Plaza del Mercado
- 1954- Plaza del Mercado
- 1955- Plaza del Mercado
- 1956- Na Jordana
- 1957- Av. Antic Regne - Duque de Calabria
- 1958- Convento Jerusalén
- 1959- Visitacion - Orihuela
- 1960- Plaza del Doctor Collado
- 1961- Convento Jerusalén
- 1962- Convento Jerusalén
- 1963- Plaza del Mercado
- 1964- Convento Jerusalén
- 1965- Na Jordana
- 1966- Plaza del Pilar
- 1967- Plaza del Pilar
- 1968- Plaza del Pilar
- 1969- Plaza del Doctor Collado
- 1970- Convento Jerusalén
- 1971- Convento Jerusalén
- 1972- Plaza de la Merced
- 1973- Xativa - Bailen
- 1974- Plaza del Pilar
- 1975- Na Jordana
- 1976- Convento Jerusalén
- 1977- Plaza del Pilar
- 1978- Plaza del Pilar
- 1979- Convento Jerusalén
- 1980- Na Jordana
- 1981- Avenida Antic Regne - Mestre Serrano
- 1982- Na Jordana
- 1983- Plaza del Pilar
- 1984- Plaza del Pilar
- 1985- Plaza del Pilar
- 1986- Na Jordana
- 1987- Plaza del Pilar
- 1988- Na Jordana
- 1989- L'Antiga de Campanar
- 1990- Na Jordana
- 1991- L'Antiga de Campanar
- 1992- Plaza del Pilar
- 1993- Convento Jerusalén
- 1994- Na Jordana
- 1995- Na Jordana
- 1996- Plaza del Pilar
- 1997- Na Jordana
- 1998- Plaza del Pilar
- 1999- Plaza del Pilar
- 2000- Convento Jerusalén
- 2001- Convento Jerusalén
- 2002- Sueca-Literato Azorín
- 2003- Na Jordana
- 2004- Nou Campanar
- 2005- Nou Campanar
- 2006- Nou Campanar
- 2007- Nou Campanar
- 2008- Nou Campanar
- 2009- Nou Campanar
- 2010- Convento Jerusalén
- 2011- Convento Jerusalén-Matemático Marzal
- 2012- Nou Campanar
- 2013- Convento Jerusalén-Matemático Marzal
- 2014- Plaza del Pilar
- 2015- Plaza del Pilar
- 2016- Cuba-Literato Azorín
- 2017- L'Antiga de Campanar
- 2018- Convento Jerusalén
- 2019- L'Antiga de Campanar
- 2020/21- Convento Jerusalén
- 2022- Convento Jerusalén-Matemático Marzal
- 2023- Exposició Misser Mascó
- 2024- Antiga Campanar
- 2025- Convento Jerusalén-Matemático Marzal
- 2026- Convento Jerusalén-Matemático Marzal
Sección especial (Infantil)
- 1976- S. Vicent - F. Esteve
- 1977- Obispo Amigó - Cuenca
- 1978- Espartero-Ramón y Cajal
- 1979- Espartero-Ramón y Cajal
- 1980- Espartero-Ramón y Cajal
- 1981- Espartero-Ramón y Cajal
- 1982- Espartero-Ramón y Cajal
- 1983- Espartero-Ramón y Cajal
- 1984- Espartero-Ramón y Cajal
- 1985- Espartero-Ramón y Cajal
- 1986- Espartero-Ramón y Cajal
- 1987- Na Jordana
- 1988- Espartero-Ramón y Cajal
- 1989- Na Jordana
- 1990- Na Jordana
- 1991- Espartero-Ramón y Cajal
- 1992- Albacete - Marva
- 1993- Espartero-Ramón y Cajal
- 1994- Obispo Amigó - Cuenca
- 1995- Sueca-Literato Azorín
- 1996- Archiduque Carlos-Chiva
- 1997- Convento Jerusalén
- 1998- Sueca-Literato Azorín
- 1999- Sueca-Literato Azorín
- 2000- Cuba-Buenos Aires
- 2001- Cuba-Buenos Aires
- 2002- Duque de Gaeta-Pobla de Farnals
- 2003- Sueca-Literato Azorín
- 2004- Nou Campanar
- 2005- Nou Campanar
- 2006- Nou Campanar
- 2007- Nou Campanar
- 2008- Exposició-Micer Mascó
- 2009- Convento Jerusalén
- 2010- Exposició-Micer Mascó
- 2011- Nou Campanar
- 2012- Nou Campanar
- 2013- Nou Campanar
- 2014- Duque de Gaeta-Pobla de Farnals
- 2015- Duque de Gaeta-Pobla de Farnals
- 2016- Na Jordana
- 2017- Convento Jerusalén
- 2018- Maestro Gozalbo-Conde Altea
- 2019- Maestro Gozalbo-Conde Altea
- 2020/21- Convento Jerusalén
- 2022- Convento Jerusalén
- 2023- Convento Jerusalén
- 2024- Convento Jerusalén
- 2025- Convento Jerusalén-Matemático Marzal
- 2026- Espartero-Ramón y Cajal
