= Sabina Muchart =

Spanish photographer (1858–1929)

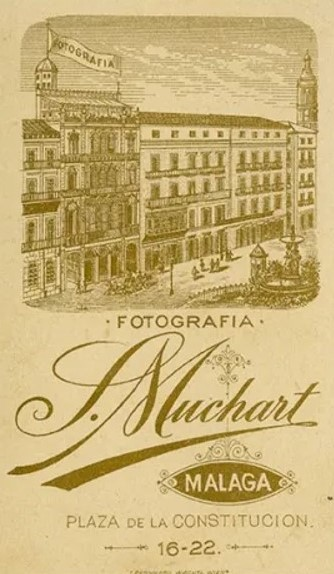
- Visiting card for Muchart
- Born: Sabina Jerónima Muchart Collboni; 20 October 1858; Olot, Catalonia, Spain
- Died: 21 March 1929 (aged 70); Málaga, Spain
- Occupation: Photographer

Sabina Jerónima Muchart Collboni (20 October 1858 – 21 March 1929) was a Spanish photographer who worked in Málaga from 1887 to 1928. Known for the variety and quality of her photographs, she is believed, among her other achievements, to have been the first Spanish female photojournalist and war photographer, although the latter is disputed.

== Early life ==
Muchart was born in Olot in the province of Girona in Catalonia, northern Spain on 20 October 1858. She was the daughter of Joan Muchart i Plana, a bricklayer, and Gerònima Collboni i Roca, the eldest daughter of a large family. Her paternal surname of Muchart was an adaptation of the French name of Mouchard. Her grandfather came from Dax in Nouvelle-Aquitaine in southwestern France.

== Málaga ==
During the third of the Carlist Wars, Muchart, like many other young Catalans, left the autonomous community of Catalonia and moved to Málaga in Andalusia in the south of Spain, sometime in 1872 or 1873. In the Málaga city census of 1875, she was recorded as being 17 and living with three of her brothers: Manuel (28), Esteban (26) and Luis (19). Initially they ran Muchart Hermanos y Cía (Muchart Brothers and Company), a textile and carpet business, which was a trade followed by many Catalans in Málaga. They also opened a shop in Córdoba, but the business failed, in part because they suffered fraud in 1882, and they eventually declared bankruptcy, closing both shops.

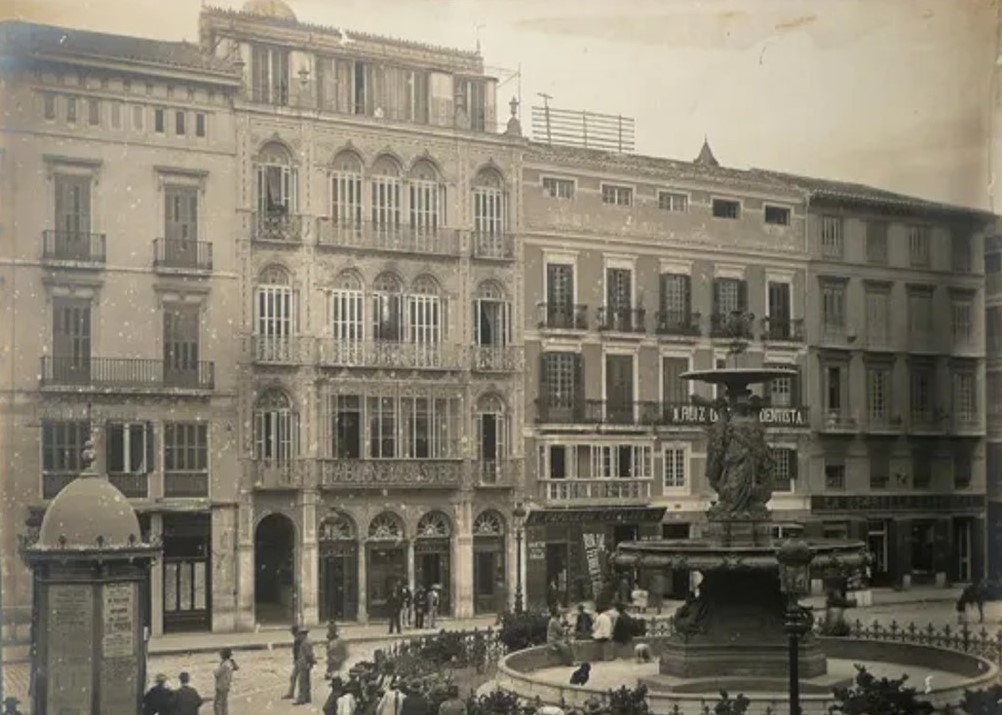
Plaza de la Constitución in Málaga by Muchart. Her studio was in the second building from the left

Probably inspired by their friendship with the artist and photographer, Ventura Reyes Corradi, a professor at the Córdoba School of Fine Arts, they then decided to open a photography studio in the centre of Málaga. As the brothers were bankrupts, this was done in the name of their sister who had no legal impediment to running a business. The Fotografía S. Muchart studio was opened at 16-22 Plaza de la Constitución in Málaga in 1887. It was on the top floor and had a glass gallery. Its large sign can be seen in photographs of the plaza of the time. She and her brothers Manuel and a younger brother, Francisco, lived in the apartment below the studio and shared the work. Manuel died prematurely in 1894, and Muchart took over the running of the business. Given the use of her initial in the company name, many people seeing her photographs in magazines automatically assumed that she must have been a man.

Muchart was, above all, a portraitist, and some of her portraits in different formats have been preserved, mainly but not solely as "business cards". In addition, she took photographs of monuments and landscapes, which she sold in her studio and in the Papelería Catalana stationery shop next door. She also took stereoscopic views, one of the most successful types of photographs of the time. Six of her stereoscopes are known to still exist. Her studio portraits, with figures standing or seated, often in front of a curtain, were typical of the era although in some cases the figures (especially women) appear more comfortable when posing than that achieved by male photographers. A good part of her photographic activity is known due to the more than 70 postcards that Ricardo Álvarez Morales published in Málaga during the first years of the 20th century, using her photographs. These include views of the city, as well as the people, such as a fishmonger and a flamenco dancer. Some of her photographs were used to advertise Málaga wines.

Muchart also contributed to the most important Spanish graphic publications of the time. Sometimes her photographs would be used: on other occasions engravings based on her photos would be published. She was the first woman to sign her works as "photographer". In 1889, La Ilustración published a report on views of Málaga using some of her photographs. In 1891, La Ilustración Española y Americana published three of her photographs of paintings by the Málaga-born painter Antonio de la Torre. In 1893, La Ilustración Artística (Barcelona) published a portrait of a group of Red Cross ambulancemen in front of the entrance to the Rostrogordo fort in Melilla, an autonomous city of Spain bordered by Morocco. They were there as a result of the First Melillan campaign (1893–1894), also known as the Margallo War, which was a conflict between the Spanish and Moroccan armies. That photograph has served to attribute to Muchart the role of war reporter, although little other justification for this has been found, with no evidence that she visited Melilla and no other war photographs by her being found.

From 1900 she became well known for three postcards of the sinking of the German navy training ship SMS Gneisenau which, after hitting the breakwater of the eastern jetty of the port of Málaga, sank dramatically in a quarter of an hour with loss of life. In 1904 she published another series of photographs of Málaga in the Madrid magazine specialized in monumental views of cities, Alfredor del Mundo (Around the World). In 1906 another report by her was published in the bullfighting magazine La Fiesta Nacional, this time made in the bullring of Málaga, in which her proximity to the bullfighting is striking.

== Death ==
Muchart lived at her studio in Plaza de la Constitución until at least 1925 and possibly until her death in Málaga on 21 March 1929. Her younger brother, Francisco, had died from tuberculosis before her. She was buried at the San Miguel Cemetery in Málaga, as were two of her brothers. Her photographs are preserved in Málaga's archives, in the Díaz Escovar collection, by the Unicaja Foundation and in private collections.
