= Picasso Museum =

Picasso Museum may refer to:

== France ==
- Musée Picasso (Antibes), Antibes, France
- Musée Picasso, Paris, France

== Spain ==
- Museu Picasso, Barcelona, Spain
- Fundación Picasso, Málaga, Spain
- Museo Picasso Málaga, Málaga, Spain

== See also ==
- Pablo Picasso (1881-1973), Spanish artist
