= Palacio de la Aduana =

Former Spanish Customs House

Coordinates: 36.719973°N 4.417172°W

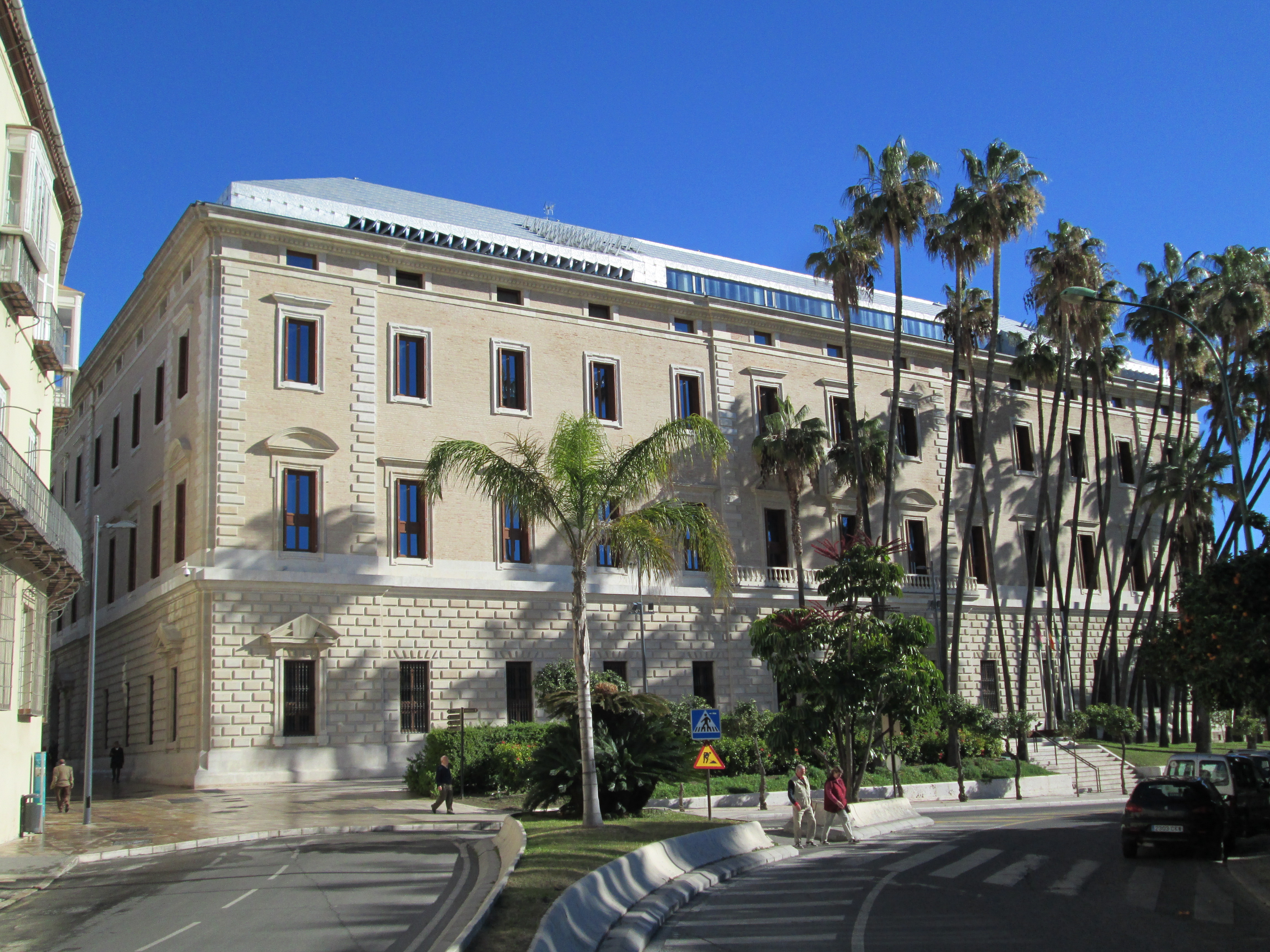
Palacio de la Aduana.

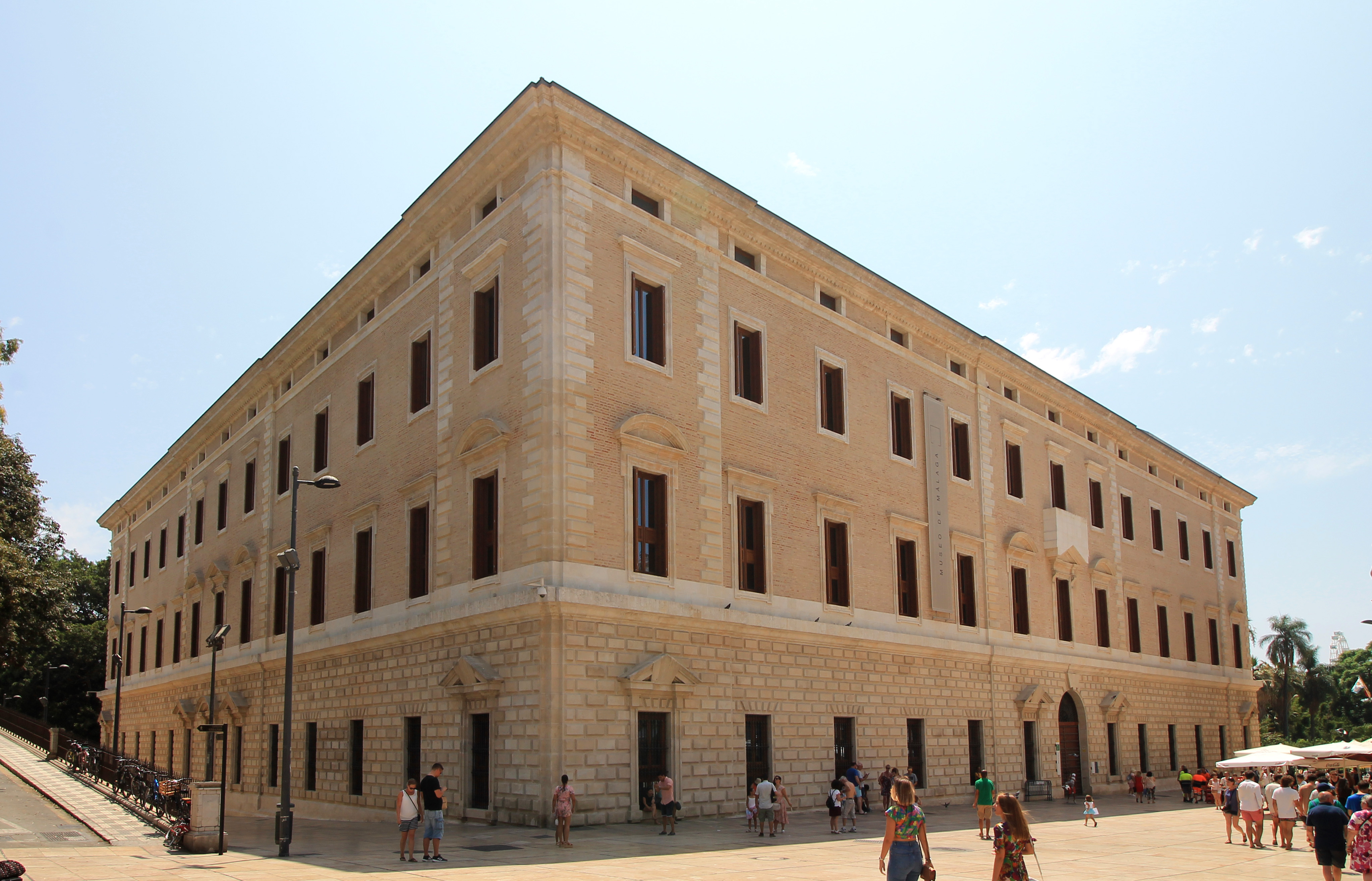
View from the north angle.

The Palacio de la Aduana ("Customs Palace") is a building in Málaga, Andalusia, Spain, originally a customs house for the Port of Málaga.

The building was proposed by Manuel Martín Rodríguez in 1787 and approved by Charles III of Spain. Work began in 1791 under the direction of administrador general of Customs Pedro Ortega Monroy and architects Miguel del Castillo and Ildefonso Valcárcel, who designed the principal façade and floor plans. Work was still under way in 1810 when the building was sacked during the occupation of Málaga by French forces during the Peninsular War; after the war, damage was repaired and construction continued. Architect Pedro Nolasco Ventura made various modifications to the plans, and the building was completed in 1829.

The Neoclassical building was modeled on Renaissance Italian palaces. Four corridors or bays surround a central patio that is porticoed for the lower two floors; then set back on the third floor, where there is an open gallery with an openwork balustrade functioning as a parapet; between sections of the parapet are Roman busts atop low walls. The building has bossed exterior walls; towering palm trees that flank the main façade.

Originally a customs house, it later served in the later 19th century as the Real Fábrica de Tabaco (Royal Tobacco Factory), as the seat of the city government, and as the Subdelegation of the Spanish Government in the Province of Málaga beginning in the Franco era, and was later used also by the Policía Nacional. As of 2004, it was being used by the Subdelegation, and the Policía Nacional, and to store the collection of the Fine Arts section of the Museo de Málaga, which lost its previous site in the Buenavista Palace when that was taken over by the Museo Picasso Málaga.

The original roof was destroyed by a fire in the tobacco factory era. On 25–26 April 1922, while functioning as the seat of the government, the building experienced a terrible fire. The wooden staircases to the top floor caught fire; at the time, there were 70 government functionaries living on that floor. 28 people died, and years of archives were destroyed.

The building is currently (as of February, 2012) being rehabilitated for permanent museum use by the Museo de Málaga. The Ministry of Culture has hired the construction firm Sacyr to rehabilitate the building, following the designs of architects Fernando Pardo, Bernardo García Tapia, and Ángel Pérez Mora. The project is budgeted at 23.6 million euros. The museum is projected to open in 2013.
