= Museo de Málaga =

Museum in Málaga, Andalusia, Spain

Coordinates: 36.720087°N 4.417401°W

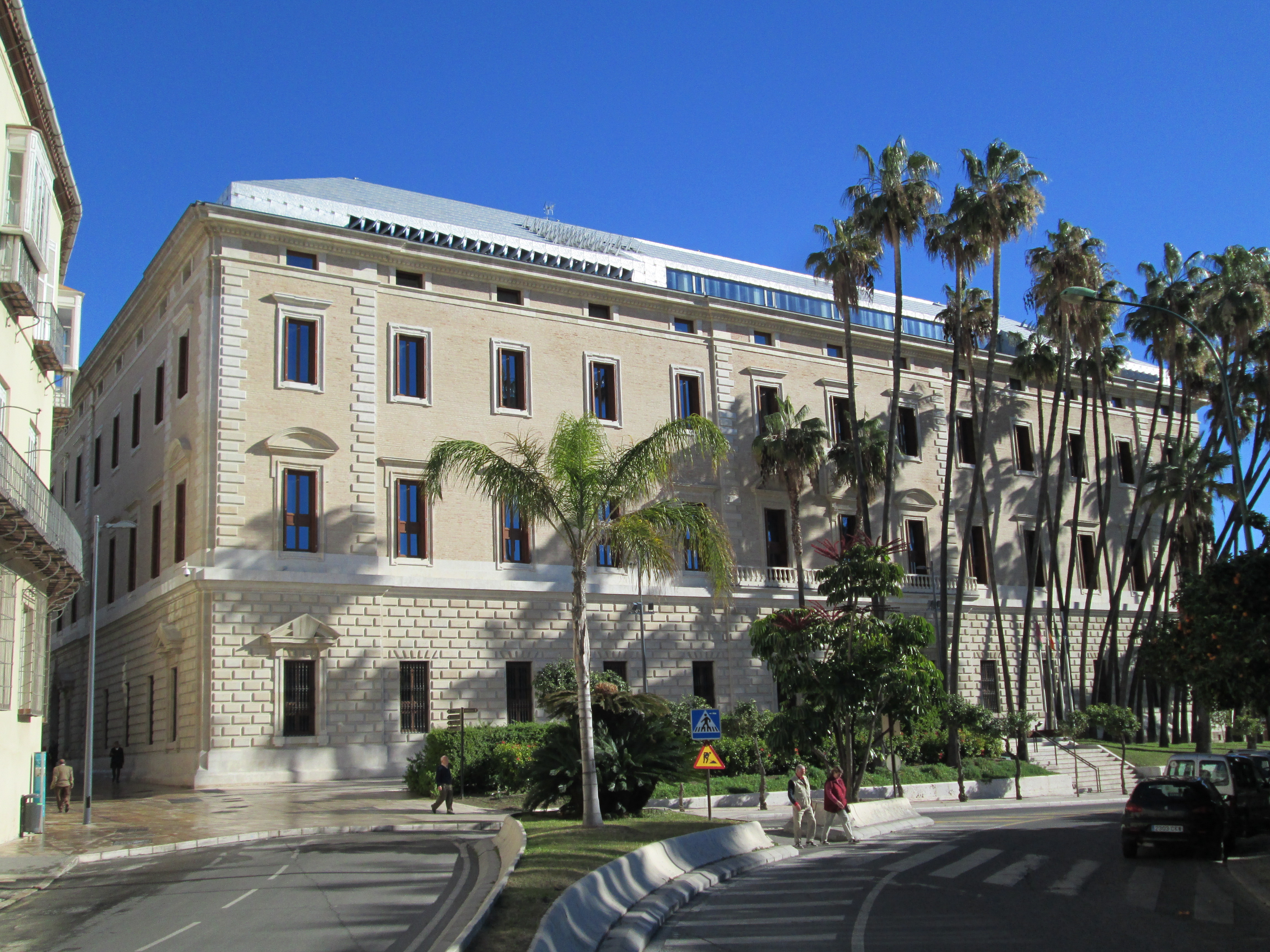
Museo de Málaga

The Museo de Málaga is a museum in Málaga, Andalusia, Spain. Formed in 1973, it brought together the former Museo Provincial de Bellas Artes (Provincial Museum of Fine Arts), born in 1913, and Museo Arqueológico Provincial (Provincial Archeological Museum), born in 1947. As of 2010, the museum remains institutionally divided into two "sections" corresponding to the older museums. There are slightly over 2,000 pieces in the Fine Arts collection and over 15,000 in the Archeology collection. The museum opened to the public in December 2016, becoming the biggest museum in Andalusia and the 5th in Spain.

== Fine Arts section ==
The Fine Arts section has its origin in the Royal Decree of 24 July 1913 that encouraged the Ministry of Public Instruction to establish provincial fine arts museums in those provincial capitals that did not yet have such an institution. Málaga's Real Academia de Bellas Artes de San Telmo ("San Telmo Royal Academy of Fine Arts") had long wished to create such an institution. The Museo Provincial de Bellas Artes was founded 3 February 1915 and opened its doors in a temporary location in the Calle Pedro de Toledo 17 August 1916. In 1920 it moved to the former Jesuit college of San Sebastián, which also housed the Academy and a school of fine arts. It moved to the Buenavista Palace in 1961, but had to leave that facility in 1997 when the Andalusian Autonomous Government bought the palace to convert it into the Museo Picasso Málaga. At that time the Fine Arts section moved to the Palacio de la Aduana, where temporary exhibitions have been held.

The museum includes works by Luis de Morales, Luca Giordano, Bartolomé Esteban Murillo, Antonio del Castillo, Alonso Cano, Pedro de Mena, Jusepe de Ribera, Francisco de Zurbarán, Diego Velázquez, Francisco de Goya, Federico de Madrazo, Ramón Casas, José Moreno Carbonero, Enrique Simonet, Joaquín Sorolla, Léon Bonnat, Franz Marc and Pablo Picasso.

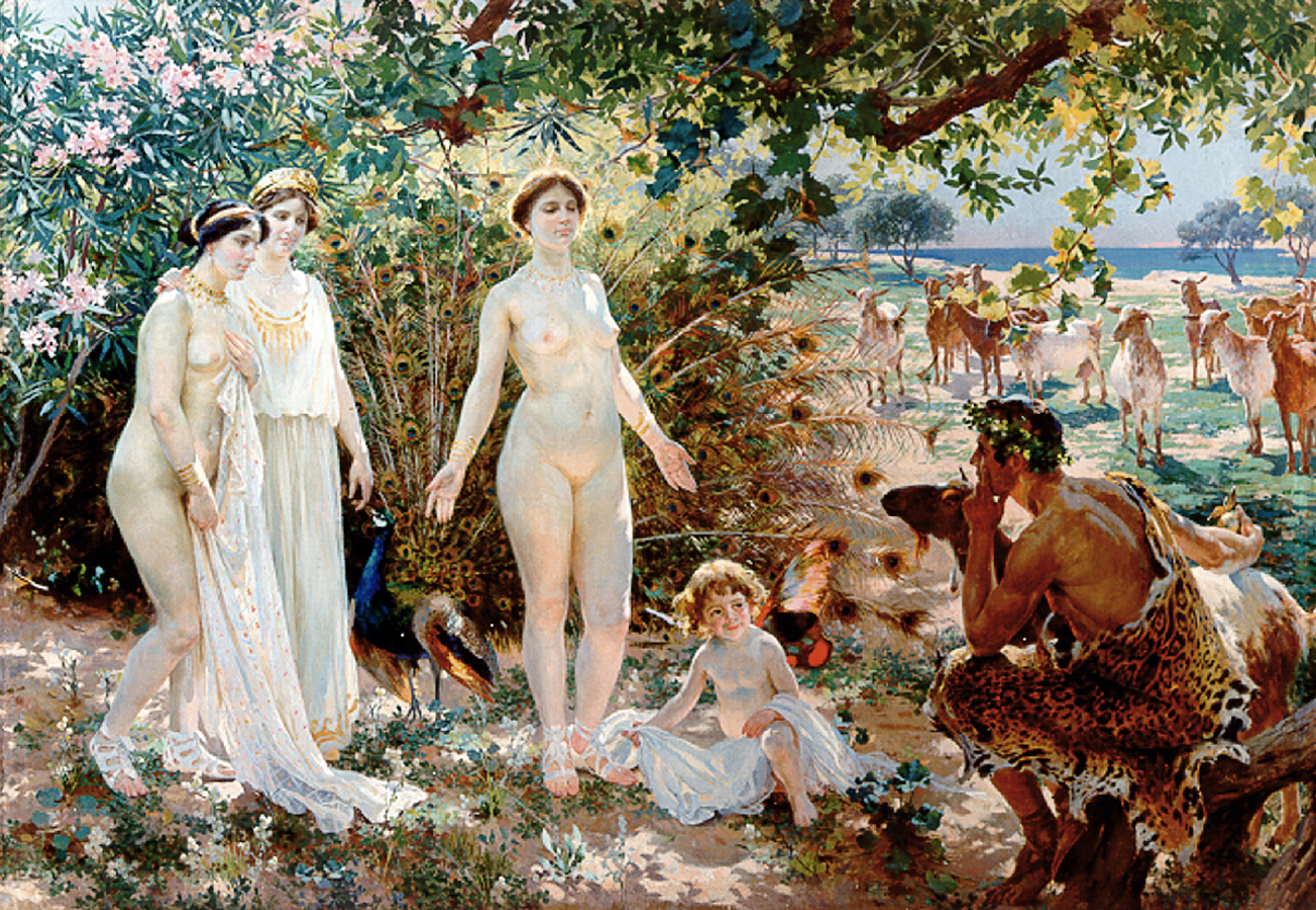
El Juicio de Paris (The Judgment of Paris, 1904), Enrique Simonet.

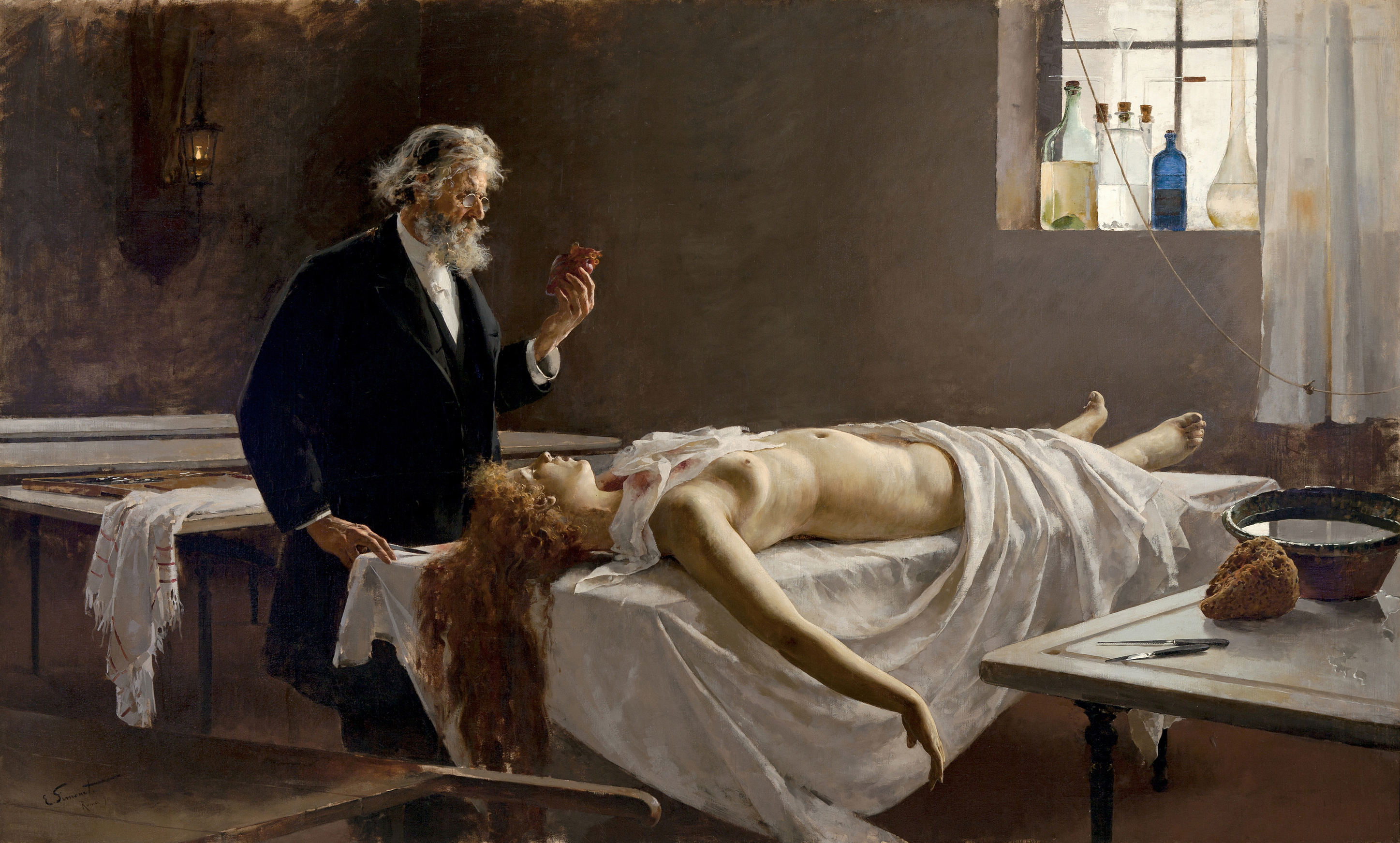
Autopsy, 1890, Enrique Simonet.

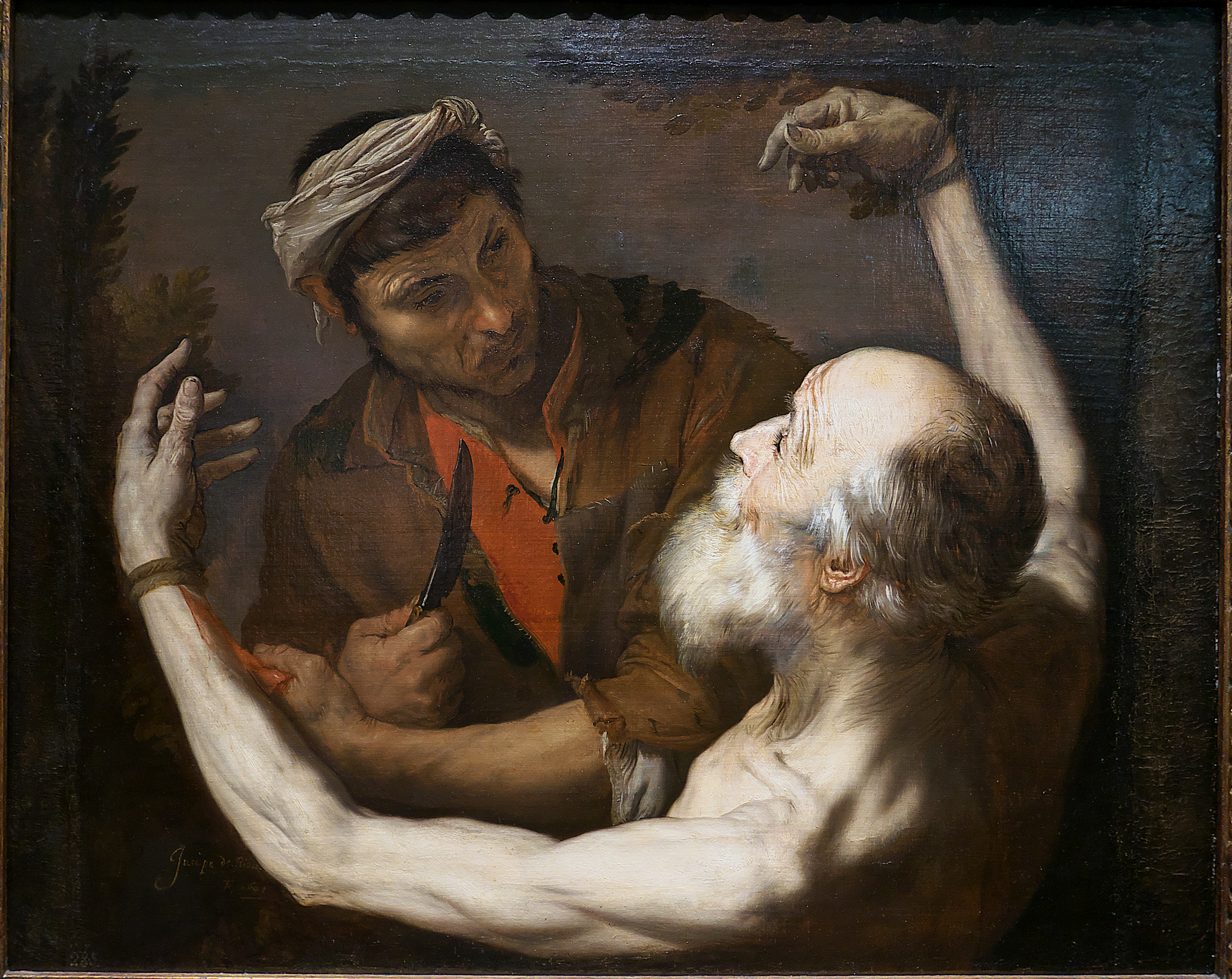
The martyrdom of Saint Bartholomew, circa 1641.
(attributed to Jusepe de Ribera)

== Archeological section ==
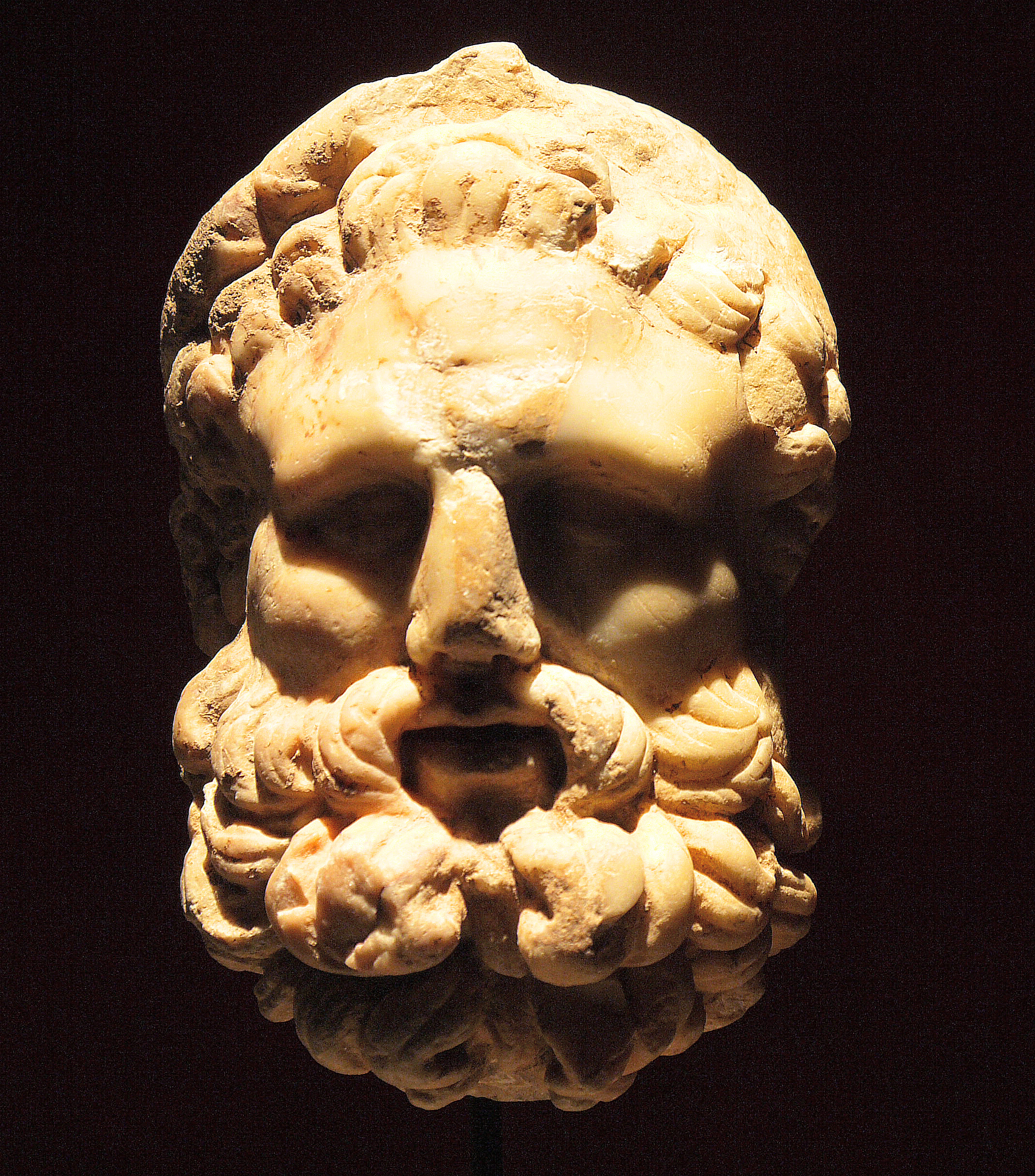
Hercules' mask, 1st century.

The Archeological section has its origin in a Decree of 1947, integrating the collections of the old Museo Loringiano (based on the 19th-century collection of the Marquesses of Casa-Loring) and the archeological holdings of the Museo Provincial de Bellas Artes. The latter came from digs that had occurred in the province since the 1930s, including digs in the Alcazaba of Málaga, where the new museum opened in 1949. In 1996, rehabilitation of the Alcazaba required a move. The collection was temporarily housed in the 16th-century Convento de la Trinidad until 1999, when it moved to the former provincial historical archive in the Avenida de Europa, which it shares with the Biblioteca Pública del Estado ("State Public Library"). Before the museum opened, there was a series of temporary exhibitions at the Palacio de la Aduana.

== See also ==
- List of museums in Málaga
- List of museums in Spain
