= Constitution Square =

Constitution Square may refer to:

- Constitution Square Historic Site, Danville, Kentucky
- Constitution Square (Kyiv)
- Constitution Square (Montevideo)
- Constitution Square (Ottawa)
- Constitution Square (Warsaw)
- Piața Constituției, Bucharest
- Plaza de la Constitución (Málaga)
- Plaza de la Constitución (Santiago)
- Zócalo, formally Plaza de la Constitución, Mexico City

== See also ==
- Syntagma Square
