= Fundación Picasso =

Art foundation in Málaga, Spain

Coordinates: 36.7240°N 4.4175°W

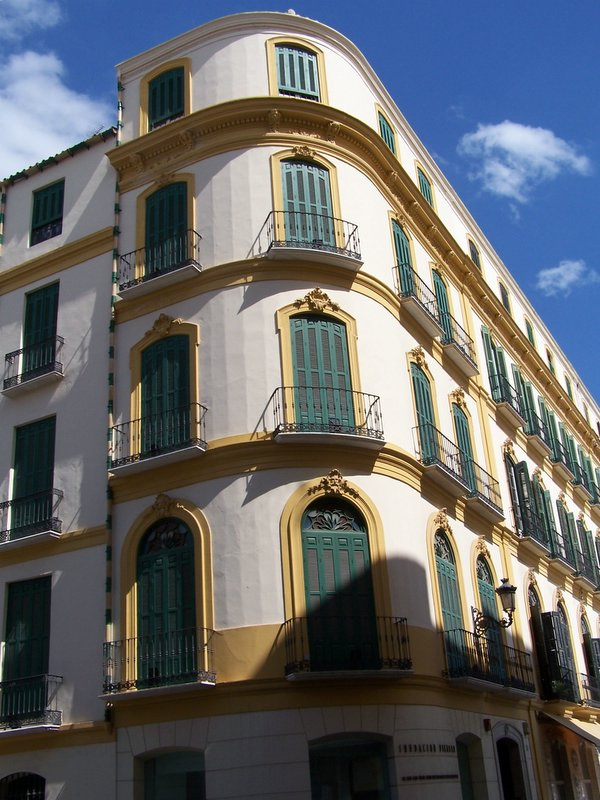
Picasso's birthplace: headquarters of the foundation and Museo Casa Natal.

The Fundación Picasso, also known as the Pablo Ruiz Picasso Foundation, is a foundation based in Málaga, Andalusia, Spain with the objective of promoting and promulgating the work of the artist Pablo Picasso. They are headquartered in the home on the Plaza de la Merced that was his birthplace, now the Museo Casa Natal ("Birthplace Museum"), one of the world's many Picasso museums.

The Fundación Picasso is distinct from the former Fundación Paul, Christine y Bernard Ruiz-Picasso ("Paul, Christine and Bernard Ruiz-Picasso Foundation") and Fundación Museo Picasso Málaga ("Malaga Picasso Museum Foundation"), both associated with the much larger Museo Picasso Málaga. Those two foundations merged in December 2009 to form the "Fundación Museo Picasso Málaga. Legado Paul, Christine y Bernard Ruiz-Picasso" ("Museo Picasso Málaga Foundation. The Paul, Christine and Bernard Ruiz Picasso Legacy").

The foundation was created by the city government of Málaga in 1988. Headquartered since its founding in the Casa Natal—declared a Historical-Artistic Monument of National Interest—it later obtained an additional exhibition space at Number 13 of the same plaza in 2005.

The facility includes a Picasso documentation center; art collections; a department of cultural promotion, which organizes expositions and conferences; and the Museo Casa Natal. In 2009 the Andalusian Autonomous Government agreed to give the foundation the Palacio de Buenavista (seat of the Museo Picasso Málaga), as a result of the merger of the Fundación Picasso and the Fundación Paul, Christine y Bernard Ruiz-Picasso. The new merged foundation is officially the "Fundación Museo Picasso Málaga. Legado Paul, Christine y Bernard Ruiz-Picasso" ("Museo Picasso Málaga Foundation. The Paul, Christine and Bernard Ruiz Picasso Legacy").

Besides their collection of works by Picasso, the museum also has a collection of the work of the philosopher, inventor, and kinetic sculptor Frank Rebaxes and a collection of sketches by Luis Molledo. There is also a large collection of works by other artists, with a particular emphasis on engravings. There are engravings by Pablo Palazuelo, Manuel Hernández Mompó, Eduardo Arroyo, Rafael Canogar, Manuel Rivera, Arman, Alfonso Albacete, Manuel Quejido and Marc Chagall, and other graphic works by Joan Miró, Christo, Francis Bacon, Joan Brossa, Max Ernst, Antoni Tàpies, Eduardo Chillida, Perejaume, Jaume Plensa, Dokoupil, Oswaldo Guayasamín, Josep Guinovart, Wifredo Lam, Roberto Matta, Henry Moore and others. There are also works by local Malagan artists Manuel Barbadillo, Enrique Brinkmann, Eugenio Chicano, Jorge Lindell, Francisco Peinado, and Dámaso Ruano; works by Carlos Durán, Joaquín de Molina, Diego Santos, and Joaquín Gallego; works by the winners of the Beca Pablo Ruiz Picasso a las Artes Plásticas (Pablo Ruiz Picasso Scholarship for the Plastic Arts); and a small collection of sculpture.

== See also ==
- List of single-artist museums
