= Plaza de la Merced =

Square in Málaga, Spain

- Plaza del Mercado; Plaza de Riego
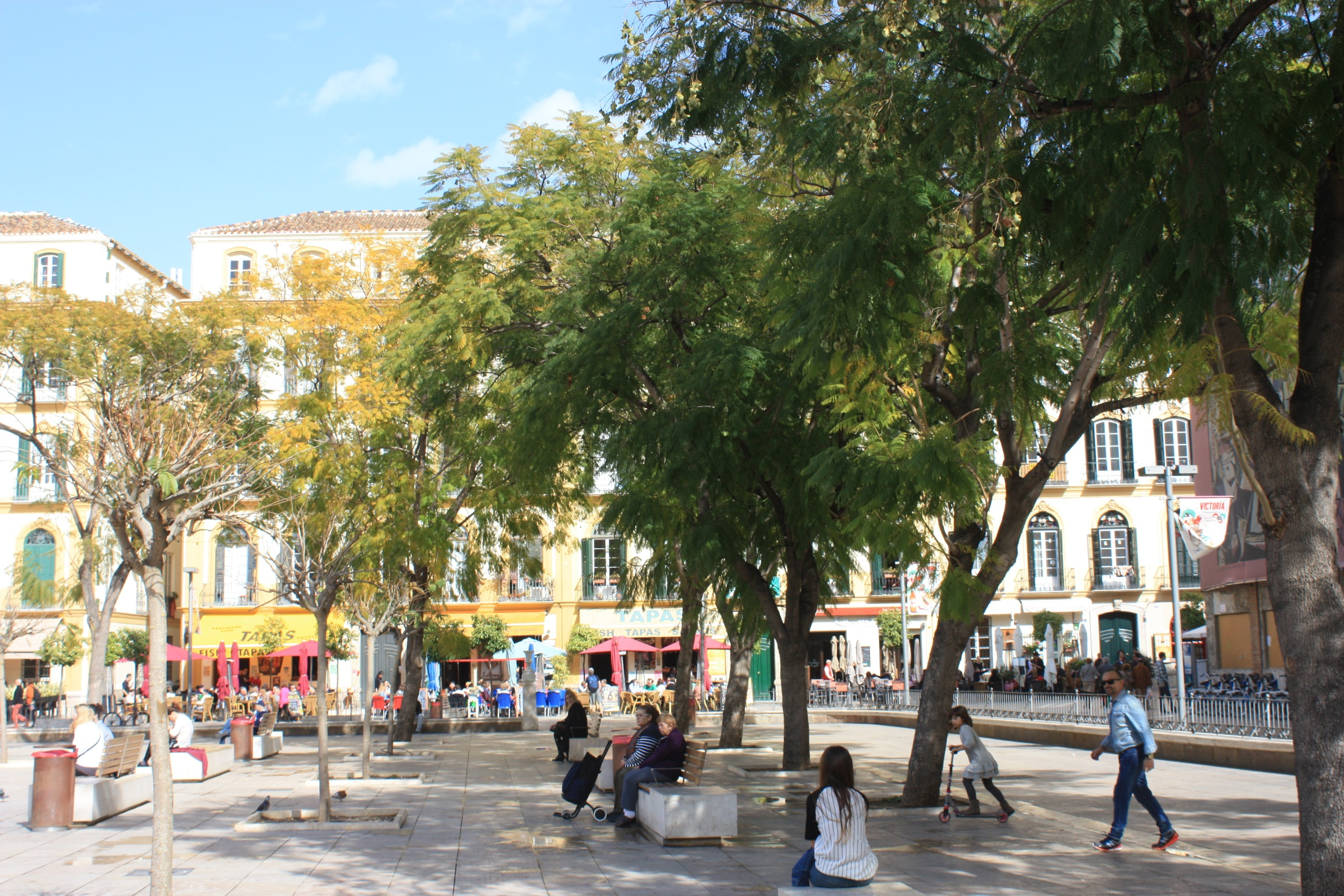
- Interactive map of Plaza de la Merced
- Owner: Ayuntamiento de Málaga
- Location: Málaga, Spain
- Quarter: Barrio la Merced
- Coordinates: 36.7234°N 4.4175°W
- East: Calle Victoria
- South: Calle Álamos

Plaza de la Merced is a public square located in the barrio La Merced in central Málaga, Spain.

The plaza has been a part of the city since the city of Málaga's Roman era, and has been operating as a town market place since at least the fifteenth century.

It is one of the largest public squares in Málaga’s city center, and is also known for containing Pablo Picasso's childhood home.

== History ==
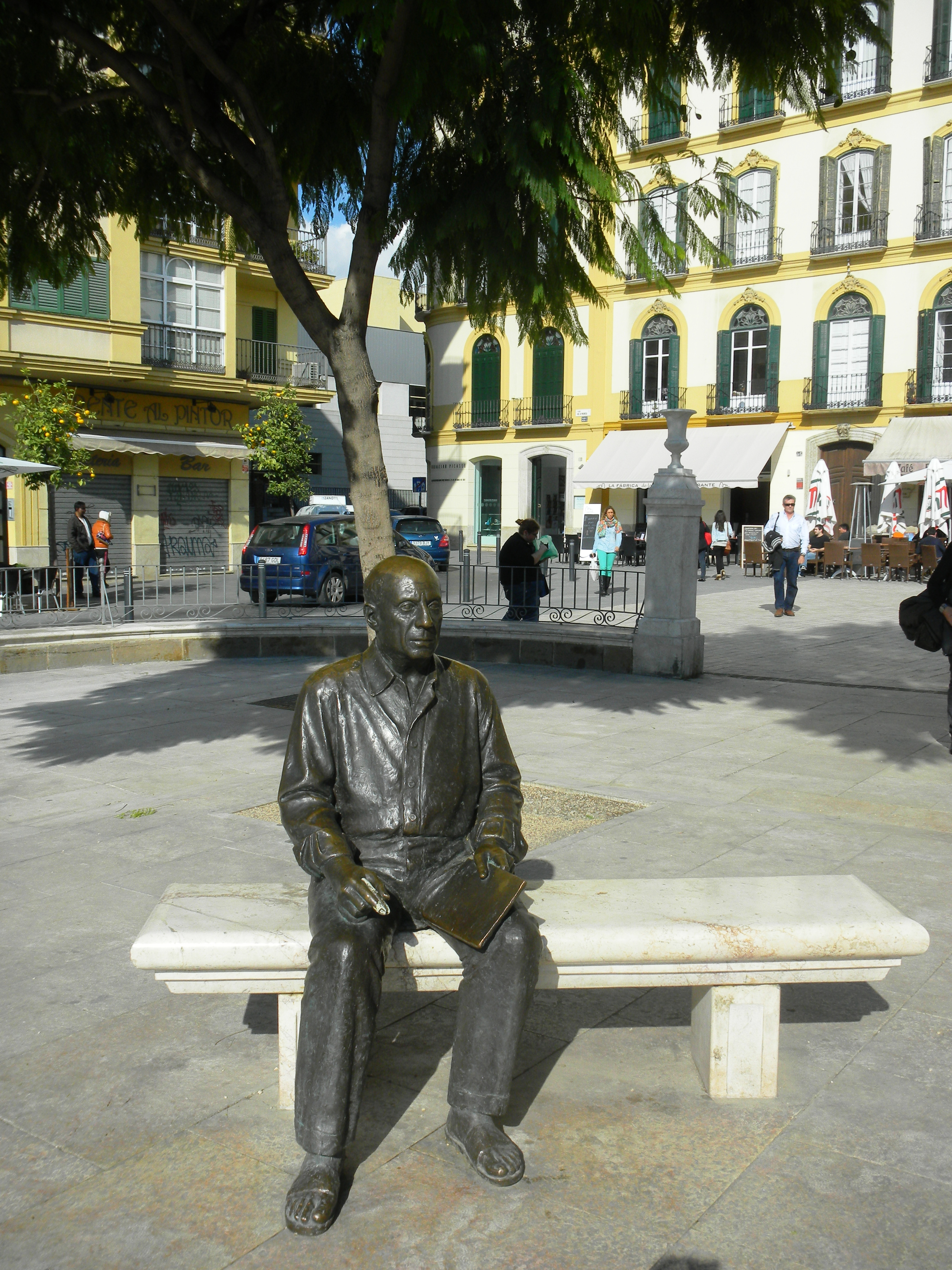
Statue of Pablo Picasso in the plaza

Since Rome, the area now known as Plaza de la Merced was, as it is today, an open public space.

During the Arabic rule of the city, the plaza fell outside of the city's exterior wall, and was located near the entrance la Puerta de Granada through which Ferdinand and Isabel entered in 1487 upon conquering the city.

In the 15th century the square operated as a public market. For this reason, it was previously called Plaza del mercado (Market square).

In 1507 Mercedarian friars arrived in the plaza, acquiring a plot of land on which they built a church, the plaza then takes its name from the friars order. The temple stood there until 1931.

In the 1820s it was named Plaza Riego after the General Riego who had resided in building located in the Plaza.

== Features ==
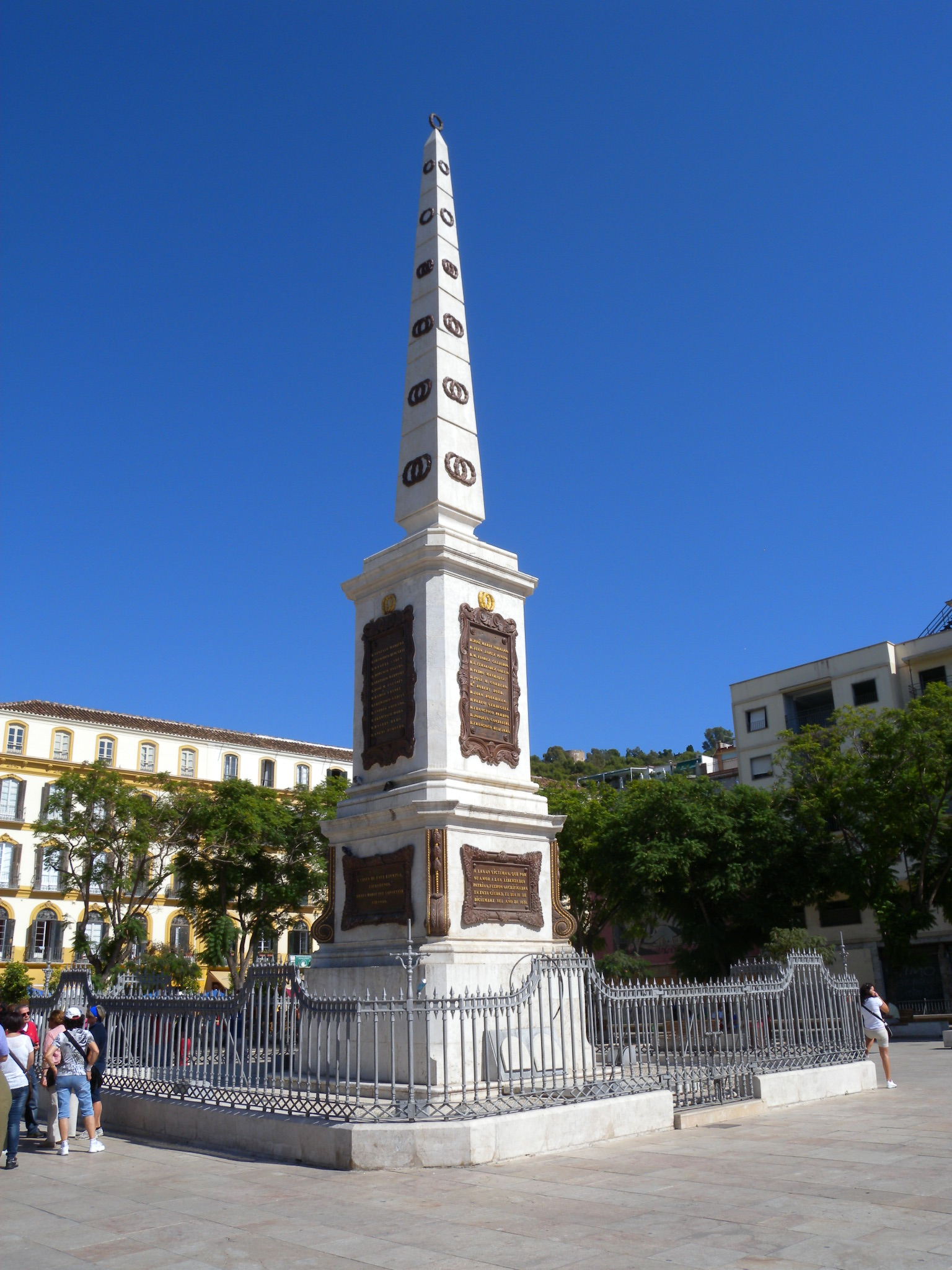
Monumento a Torrijos located in the center of Plaza de la Merced

=== Monumento a Torrijos ===
Monumento a Torrijos (Monument to Torrijos) is a 19th-century monument located in the center of the plaza. Spanish architect Rafael Mitjana designed the monument in honor of General José María Torrijos and 48 of his companions who were shot to death on order of Ferdinand VII . The base of the monument houses the remains of the men.

=== Picasso statue ===
The statue was built by Francisco López Hernández and installed in 2008. The bronze statue measures 1.4 meters in height, and depicts Picasso sitting on a marble bench taking notes with a pencil. The statue occupies part of a bench, allowing visitors to sit next to it.

=== Casa natal de Picasso ===
The house in which Pablo Picasso was born is located at number 15 of the plaza. The house now operates as a museum, and the building is the headquarters of the Pablo Ruiz Picasso Foundation.

== See also ==
- Calle Larios
- Plaza de la Constitución (Málaga)
