= Port of Málaga =

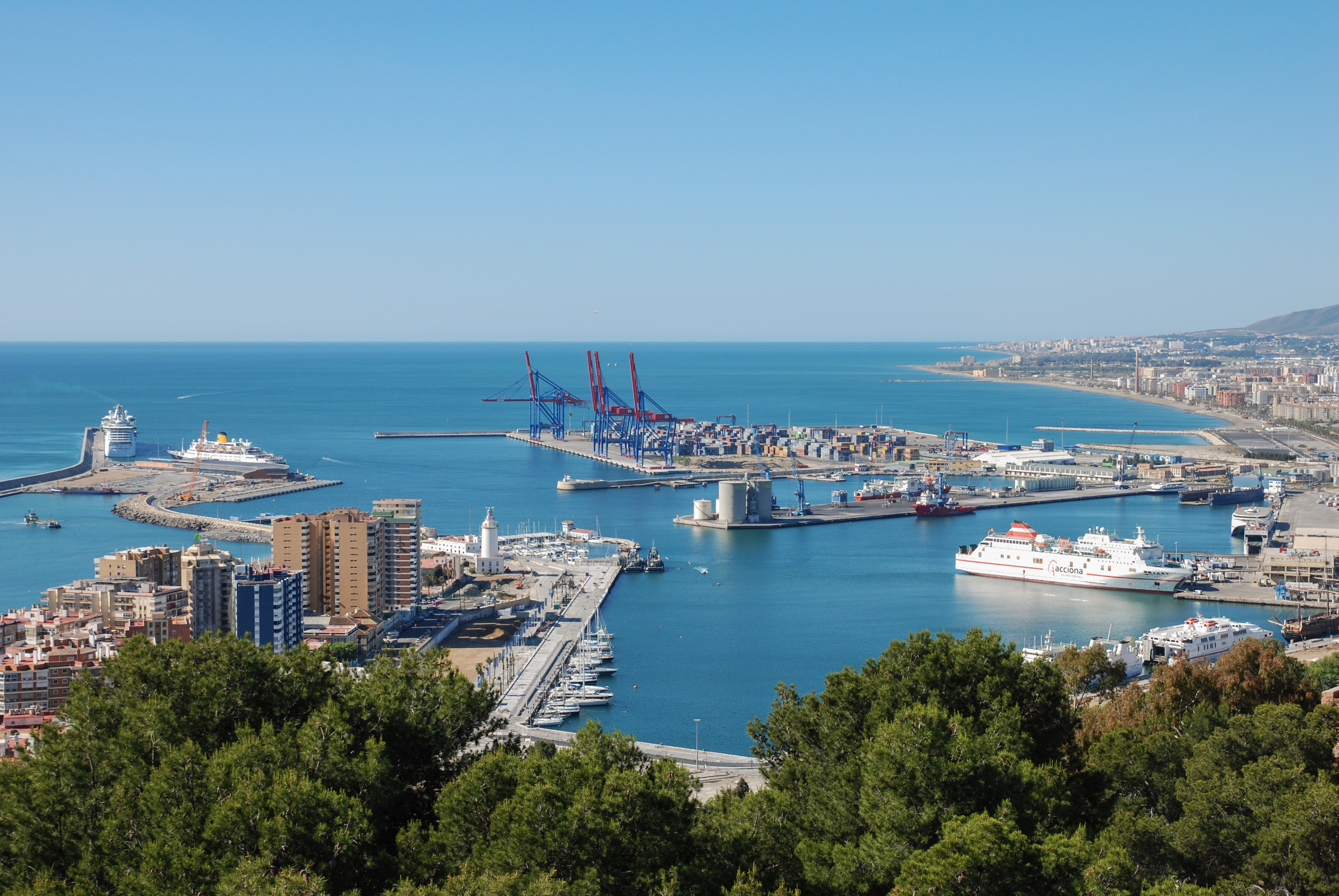

Location
- Country: Spain
- Location: Málaga
- Coordinates: 36°43′N 4°25′W
- UN/LOCODE: ESAGP

Details
- Land area: 1.15 km² (115 ha)

Statistics
- Annual cargo tonnage: 2,901,023 tonnes (2013)
- Annual container volume: 296,350 TEU's (2013)
- Passenger traffic: 662,659 (2013)
- Website www.puertomalaga.com

The Port of Málaga is an international seaport located in the city of Málaga in southern Spain, on the Costa del Sol coast of the Mediterranean. It is the oldest continuously-operated port in Spain and one of the oldest in the Mediterranean.

Principal port activities include cruise shipping and the importation of containerised manufactured products, break bulk and vehicles. A small fishing fleet also operates from the port.

== History ==
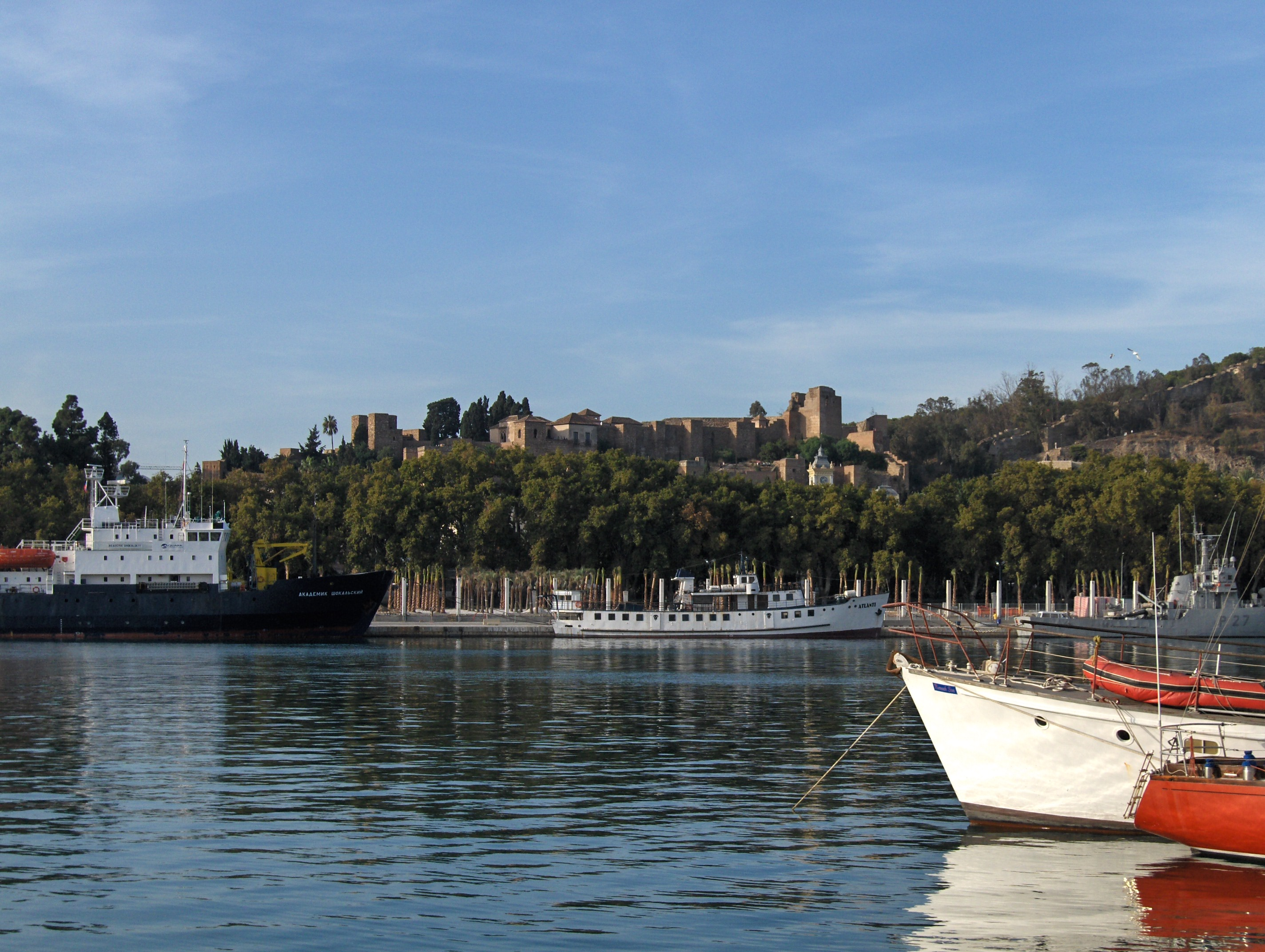
View of the Alcazaba of Málaga from the port.

=== Ancient and medieval times ===
The Port of Malaga was founded by Phoenicians from Tyre in around 1000 BC. The name Malaka is probably derived from the Phoenician word for salt because fish was salted on the first dock; in other Semitic languages the word for salt is still Hebrew מלח mélaḥ or Arabic ملح milḥ. This first dock was a single waterfront quay parallel to the shore and extending for about 500 metres from the Palacio de la Aduana to the Jardines de Puerta Oscura.

By Roman times Malaga had become an important export port for minerals, pottery, almonds, wine and oil. An Iberian delicacy was fish prepared with garum, large quantities of which were also exported to Rome.

Trade continued to grow, peaking when Malaga (now Mālaqah (Arabic مالقة) was declared the capital of the Islamic kingdom of Granada. When the kingdom passed into Catholic control in 1487 the port assumed a strategic importance as an embarkation point for Spanish soldiers in the conquest of the Rif, Melilla, Peñon de Velez and Oran, and was renamed the Port of Málaga.

=== Imperial Spain ===
The Port of Málaga grew swiftly throughout the 16th and 17th centuries, establishing itself as Spain's major export port for cereals and manufactures during the Habsburg and Enlightenment eras. In 1720 King Philip V appointed French engineer Bartolome Thurus to prepare a project of port expansion for commercial and military needs, culminating in the construction of both the East Dock and the New Quay. The first lighthouse was built in 1814.

=== Twentieth century ===
Between 1900 and 1910 an extensive reconstruction of port facilities resulted in the modernization of the existing quays and the completion of the current passenger terminal. The Málaga-Puertollano oil pipeline was completed by 1920, permitting oil exports directly from the port.

After the Second World War the importance of the port declined as new ports opened in North Africa and the Middle East, and post-war reconstruction led to the massive expansion of facilities at Port of Rotterdam and elsewhere. The Puertotollano pipeline ceased operation in the 1990s. Port operations were concentrated around ten wharves on the southern border of the existing port. The northern and central port areas were then progressively returned to the control of the city and converted for residential use.

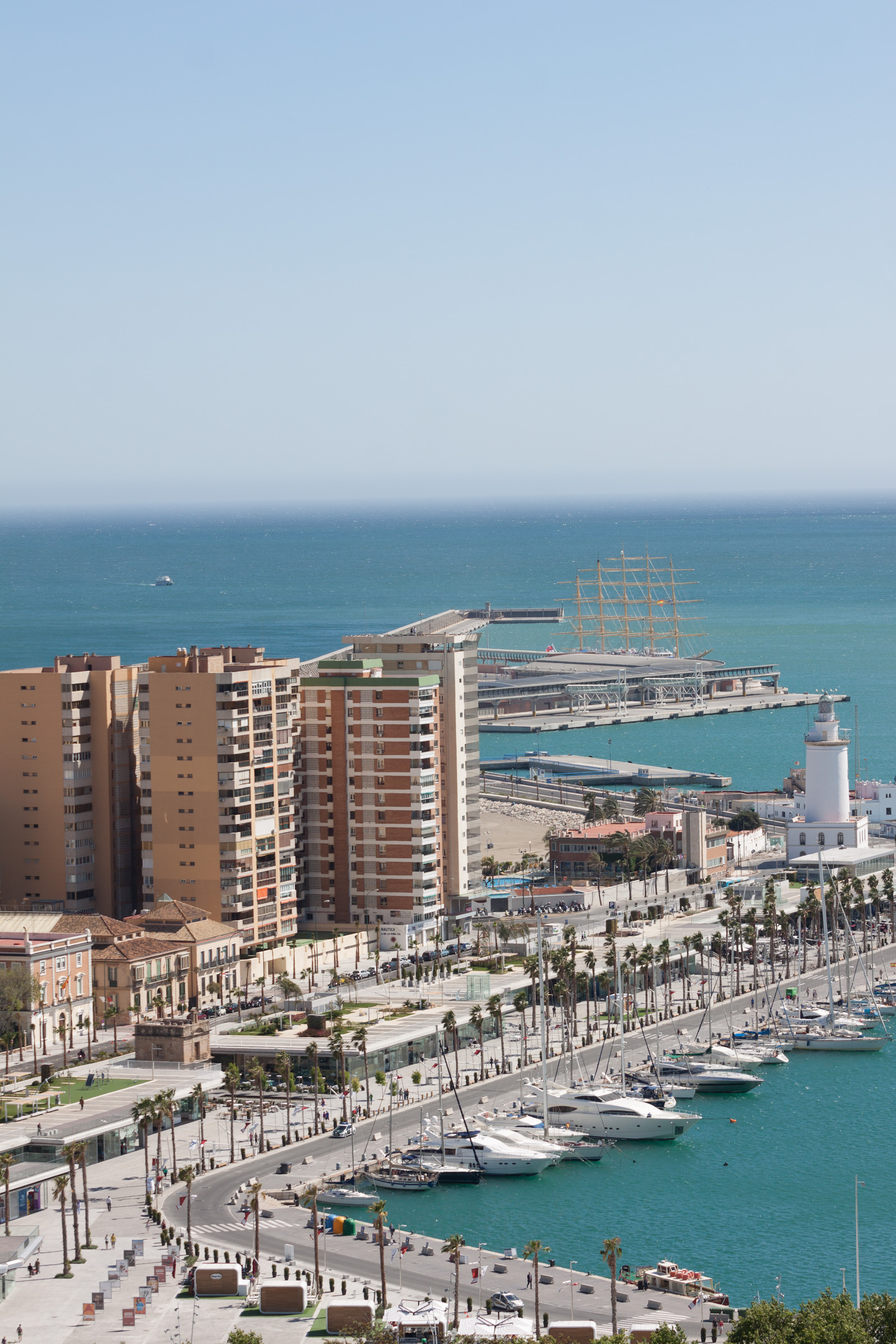
Muelle 1, (Quay 1) shopping and restaurant area.

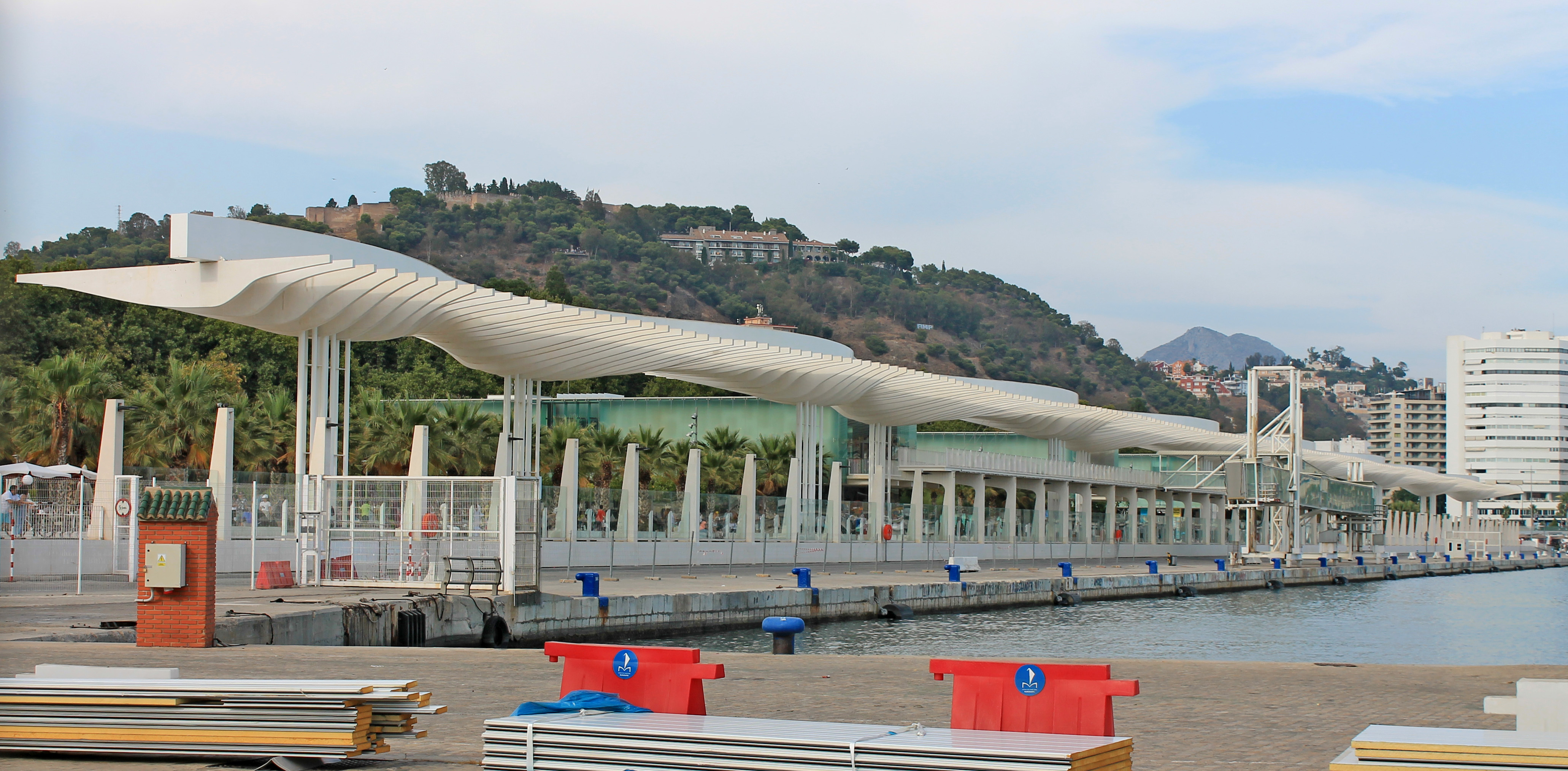
Quay 2.

=== Port facilities ===
Ten wharves are currently in operation at the Port of Málaga:

- East Quay: Embarkation for cruise ships.
- Quay n°1 "Ricardo Gross": Superyachts and touristic catamarans.
- Quay n°2 "Guadiaro": Cruise ships.
- Quay n°3 "Cánovas": Roll-on/roll-off.
- Quay n°4 "Heredia": Roll-on/roll-off, bulk liquids, break bulk.
- Quay n°5 Floating dock: Repairs and defence forces.
- Quay n°6 "Romero Oak grove 1": Bulk liquids, dangerous goods.
- Quay n°7 "Romero Oak grove 2": Bulk liquids, dangerous goods.
- Multipurpose Quay n°9: Containers, Roll-on/roll-off.
- Soft Port 1: Bulk liquid import/export requiring specialist equipment.

Until 2022, the port also hosted the Mario López Shipyard, part of the Cernaval Group Shipyards. Founded in the early 1980s by local entrepreneur Mario López, the facility carried out more than forty ship repairs annually for vessels from around the world. The shipyard ceased its activity in Málaga in late 2022.

In 2022 the port inaugurated the IGY Málaga Marina, a new facility for superyachts, with capacity for 24 yachts up to 180 metres in length. Operated by IGY Marinas, this project positions Málaga as one of the key superyacht hubs in the western Mediterranean.

In addition to cruise shipping and superyacht services, the port also hosts small-scale fishing and leisure operations, including sightseeing and excursion boats for visitors along the Costa del Sol.

== Future works ==
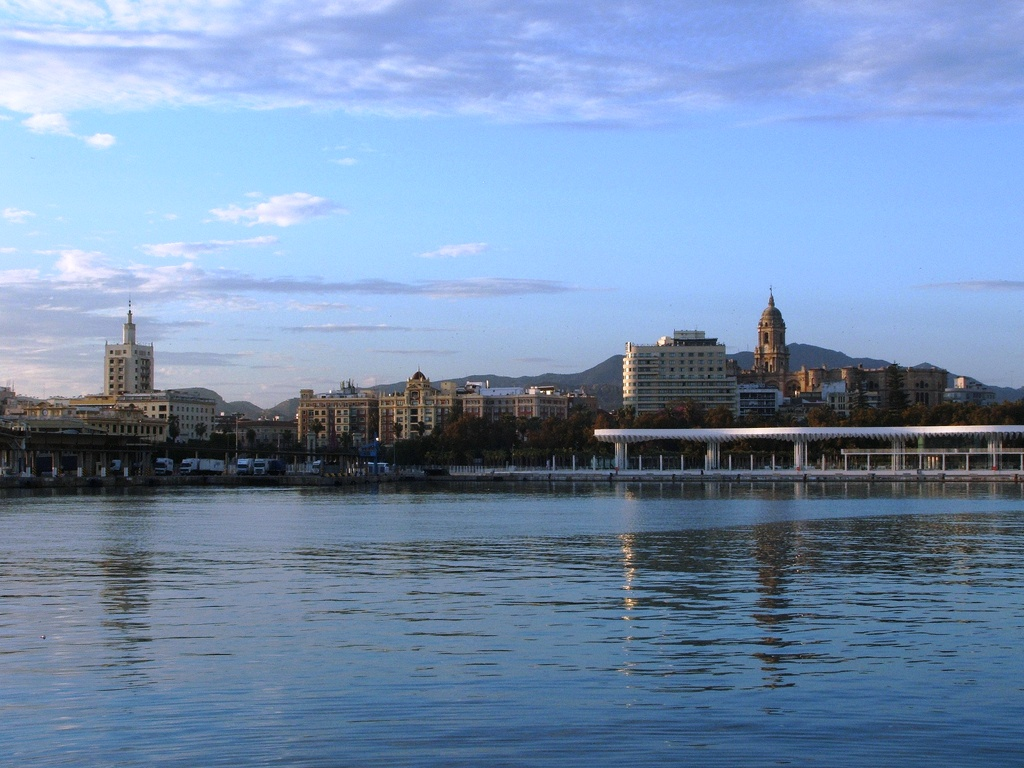
City view from the port.

An extensive program of works is planned for the Port as part of a Special Plan developed by the City of Málaga.

The Heredia Quay will be refurbished to expand port operation centres and provide an additional 500 car spaces, with works estimated at 33 million euros. A new passenger terminal, port museum and environmental education centre are also planned for inclusion in the cruise ship facilities at Quay 2, at a further cost of 22 million euros. The Eastern Quay passenger terminal will be remodeled to improve pedestrian access and double existing capacity to 560,000 passengers a year. The total area of the new terminal is 1,270 m², consisting of two floors and two new berths (Southern and Northern), with a construction cost of 21.3 million euros.

In February 2023, the Port Authority awarded the administrative concession for the new San Andrés Marina to Marina Málaga San, S.L. The project design, presented in 2022, was prepared by Estudio Seguí in collaboration with IGY Marinas and Ocean Capital Partners. Media sources also cite a consortium including Al Alfia, IGY Marinas, and Ocean Capital Partners among the developers. The marina will comprise more than 500 berths for vessels between 8 and 50 metres, along with commercial, leisure and educational facilities, with an estimated investment of 45–54 million euros. Construction is expected to begin in 2025, with the opening scheduled for late 2027.
