= Palacio de Buenavista =

Historical edifice in Málaga, Andalusia, Spain

Coordinates: 36°43′18″N 4°25′06″W

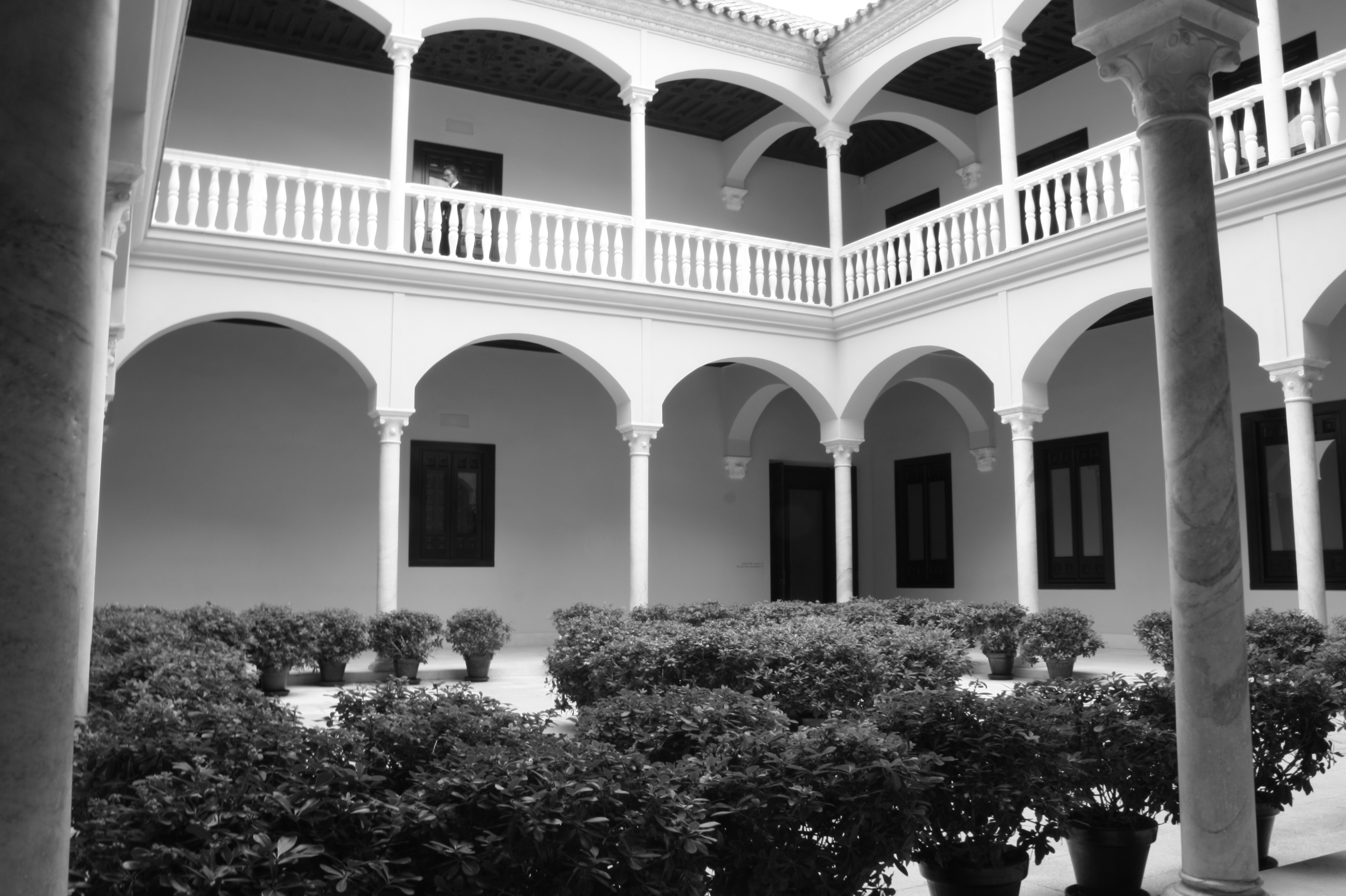
"Patio" of the Buenavista Palace.

Buenavista Palace (Spanish: El Palacio de Buenavista or El Palacio de los Condes de Buenavista, "the palace of the counts of Buenavista") is a historical edifice in Málaga, Andalusia, Spain. It was built in the first half of the 16th century for Diego de Cazalla on the ruins of a Nasrid palace. Declared a "Property of Cultural Interest" in 1939, it was leased to the Spanish government in 1946 for a provincial art museum, which opened in 1961. In 1997 it was acquired to house the present Museo Picasso Málaga, which opened there in 2003. It is located in the historic center of Málaga, in the Calle San Agustín in the former Jewish quarter (judería), next to the San Agustín convent and not far from the Cathedral of Málaga.

== Architecture ==
Except for its towers, the Buenavista Palace is a two-story building. Its Plateresque façade is built of thick stone blocks; the ornament around the doors and windows is elaborate, although the rest of the ashar facades are simple to the point of austerity. The doors and windows are very large, and are placed asymmetrically. The design of the main entrance is of a piece with the balcony over the door. The interior is arranged around two patios. The first patio is surrounded by a double colonnade (a separate colonnade for each story). The other, farther in, is in the Mudéjar style, with octagonal pillars, and two Roman-era mosaics. One of these, from Cártama, represents the birth of Venus. The other, from Benalmádena, is in a geometric pattern. The stairway at the right accesses the upper story, which originally had the same floor plan as the ground floor. The floor plans have been somewhat modified for the Museo Picasso Málaga.

The palace is the most important example of seigneurial architecture executed after the 1487 conquest of Málaga by the forces of the Catholic Monarchs Isabella and Ferdinand during the Granada War, the last war of the Reconquista; Diego de Cazalla had participated in that conquest. The architectural style is basically that of the Renaissance, with a Plateresque façade and Mudéjar aspects. Some of those Mudéjar aspects may be directly inherited from the previous Nasrid palace on the site: Professor Fernando Marías states that the torre morisca ("Moorish tower") adjacent to the Mudejar patio dates back to the old Nasrid palace. This combination is particularly emblematic of the period following the completion of the Reconquista. The chief Mudéjar element is the tower, which resembles those of certain houses in Granada in its style of cornice and in the low alfiz-style arches of its upper story, but is on a much grander scale than any found in that city.

The basement is effectively an archeological museum in its own right, visible from above through transparent panels in the floor. During the construction of the museum, there were a series of interesting discoveries. There are remnants of a city wall and towers dating back to the Phoenicians, of a Roman factory to produce the fish-based sauce garum, and also of an earlier Nasrid palace on the same site.

== History ==
The palace was built in the first half of the 16th century. sometime after the death of Diego de Cazalla, it passed to the Counts of Mollina and in the 19th century to the Counts of Buenavista. Eventually, the palace passed to the Countess de Luna. It was used as a family home for centuries, but less so from some time in the 19th century. After that, the palace had various uses including as an educational center, a furniture factory, and in 1938 (during the Spanish Civil War) a Red Cross hospital.

A royal decree in 1913 established the Museo de Bellas Artes (later Museo Provincial de Bellas Artes, "Provincial Museum of Fine Arts"), which opened in 1916 and was located beginning in 1920 in a space that had formed part of the former Jesuit College of Saint Sebastian. The museum built up a strong collection, including works by Luis de Morales ("El Divino"), Luca Giordano, Bartolomé Esteban Murillo, Enrique Simonet, Francisco Zurbarán, and other comparably distinguished artists.

The Countess de Luna leased the palace to the Spanish State in 1946 as a new home for the museum; in 1961 the Museo Provincial de Bellas Artes moved into the palace. The Museum of Fine Arts was closed in 1997 to make way for the Picasso museum which, after extensive modifications including the addition of some new adjacent buildings, opened in 2003. As of 2010, the Museo Provincial de Bellas Artes collection remains intact. Various temporary exhibitions have taken place at the Palacio de la Aduana, but it does not yet have a new permanent home.

The palace was selected for the Picasso museum in accord with the wishes of the museum's principal donor, Christine Ruiz-Picasso, who wished the museum to be housed in a notable and typically Andalusian building. Besides the palace itself, the museum incorporates 18 houses from the old judería (Jewish quarter).

The museum was purchased in 1996 by the Andalusian Autonomous Government for the sum of 650 million pesetas. (roughly US$6.5 million). The conversion of the building for the Museo Picasso was a major undertaking. Led by the American architect Richard Gluckman, along with Isabel Cámara and Rafael Martín Delgado, it was budgeted at over 2,000 million pesetas, about US$20 million.

In December 2009 the Fundación Museo Picasso Málaga ("Malaga Picasso Museum Foundation")—which operated the museum—and the Fundación Paul, Christine y Bernard Ruiz-Picasso ("Paul, Christine and Bernard Ruiz-Picasso Foundation")—which owned the collection—merged to become the "Fundación Museo Picasso Málaga. Legado Paul, Christine y Bernard Ruiz-Picasso" ("Museo Picasso Málaga Foundation. The Paul, Christine and Bernard Ruiz Picasso Legacy"). As a result, the Andalusian government agreed to give the new merged foundation ownership of the palace.
