= Falla Nou Campanar =

Falla Nou Campanar (Valencian pronunciation: [ˈfaʎa ˈnɔw kampaˈnaɾ]) is a Falla in Valencia, Spain that is erected by falleros (volunteers) every year for the Festival of St. Joseph.

From 2004 to 2009, Falla Nou Campanar won the best falla prize. It won the largest fall competition seven times.

For several years, the Falla Nou Campanar organization was headed by real estate businessman Juan Armiñana, who invested large amounts of money in the falla. Armiñana created the first falla to reach 30 m high. causing complaints of unfairness from other competitors.

In 2006, the large Falla Nou Campanar cost approximately 600.000 Euros and the small falla cost around 120.000 Euros. The cost of the large falla reached 720.000 Euros in 2007 and 800.000 Euros in 2008. In 2009, the cost reached approximately 1.000.000 Euros.

In 2013, Armiñana left Falla Nou Campanar with most of the falleros.

With Armiñana's departure, the falla organization lost a large amount of funding. In 2014 and 2015, the remaining falleros tried building experimental fallas with a costs of only 90.000 Euros. However, they failed to win any prizes. In 2016, the group was unable to build a falla due to lack of funding.
