= Rostrogordo =

Coordinates: 35°18′50″N 2°57′25″W

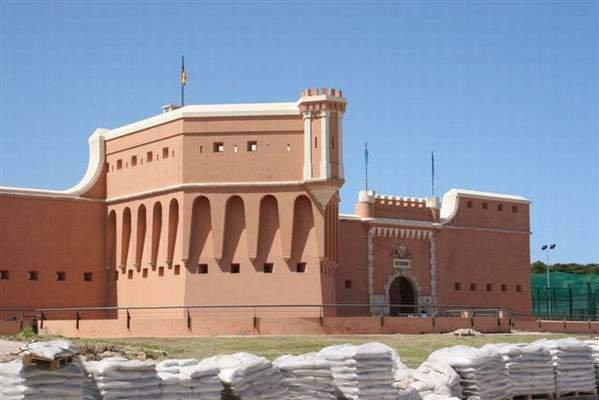
- Fuerte de Rostrogordo
- Interactive map of Rostrogordo

Rostrogordo is a plateau at the northern edge of the Spanish city of Melilla, just inside the border with Morocco, and west of the headland of Punta de Rostrogordo. It is located three kilometres to the north of Melilla city centre.

In it is located the Rostrogordo Fort (El Fuerte de Rostrogordo) and the Pinares de Rostrogordo, the Periurban Park of Rostrogordo. (Parque Periurbano de Rostrogordo). Rostrogordo is also the site of a sports complex, Parque de Ocio y Deporte El Fuerte.

Melilla's highest point is located immediately to the west of Rostrogordo, on the border with Morocco, at around 132 metres above sea level.
