= Dokoupil =

Dokoupil (feminine: Dokoupilová) is a Czech surname, which can be translated as '[he] bought additionally'. Notable people with the surname include:

- Jiří Georg Dokoupil (born 1954), Czech-German painter and graphic artist
- Tony Dokoupil (born 1980), American journalist and writer
