= Calle Marqués de Larios =

Street in Málaga, Spain

- Calle Larios
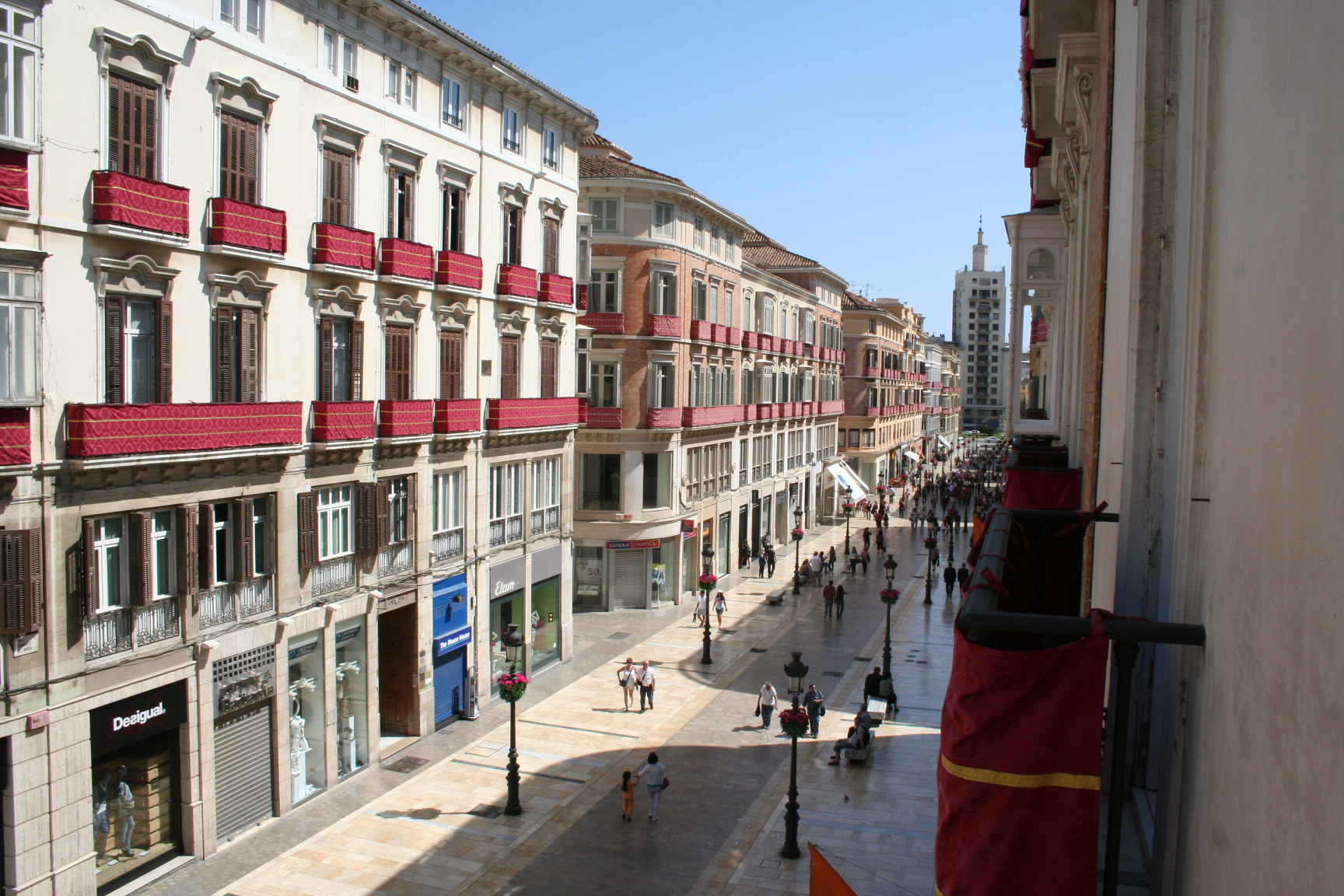
- Interactive map of Calle Marqués de Larios
- Former name: Calle 14 de abril
- Namesake: Manuel Domingo Larios y Larios, 2nd Marquess of Larios
- Type: Shopping street
- Location: Málaga, Spain
- North: Plaza de la constitución
- South: Alameda principal

Construction
- Commissioned: 1880
- Inauguration: August 27, 1891

Other
- Designer: José María de Sancha

Calle Marqués de Larios, also known simply as Calle Larios, is a pedestrian and shopping street in Málaga, Spain. The street was inaugurated on 27 August 1891.

It is the most expensive street to live on in Málaga, and the eleventh most expensive to live on in all of Spain.

== History ==
=== Construction ===
On 1 May 1880, a corporation was formed by the local government of Málaga to fund the construction of the street. The company needed to raise 1 million pesetas, and sold 40 shares of 25,000 pesetas each. A majority of shares were purchased by the Larios family.

The street was initially designed by architect José María Sancha. Further changes to the design were later made by Manuel Rivera.

In 1887, the responsibility for the project was taken on by the Larios family. The street was named after Manuel Domingo Larios y Larios, the 2nd Marquess of Larios. He is also depicted in a statue by Mariano Benlliure on the south end of the street.

Over 1200 laborers worked on the project.

=== Later history ===
During the second republic, the street was briefly renamed "Calle 14 de abril" in honor of the date of the new democracy.

The street was bombed during the Spanish Civil War, though it did not suffer much architectural damage.

In 2002 the street was converted to only allow foot traffic.

== Architecture ==
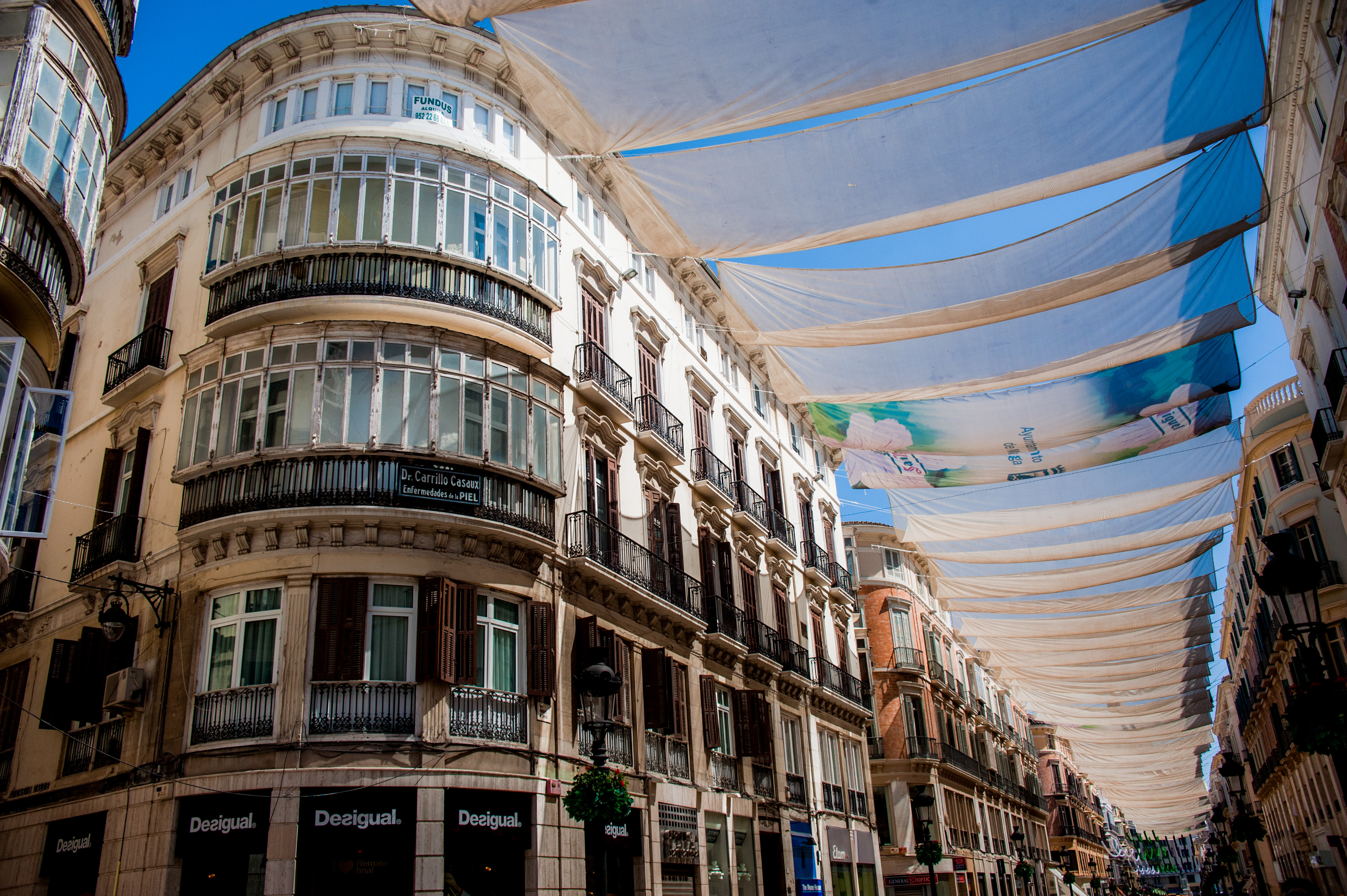

Much of the street's buildings were designed by Spanish architect Eduardo Strachan Viana-Cárdenas, who was greatly influenced by the architecture of the city of Chicago.

== Festivals and Events ==
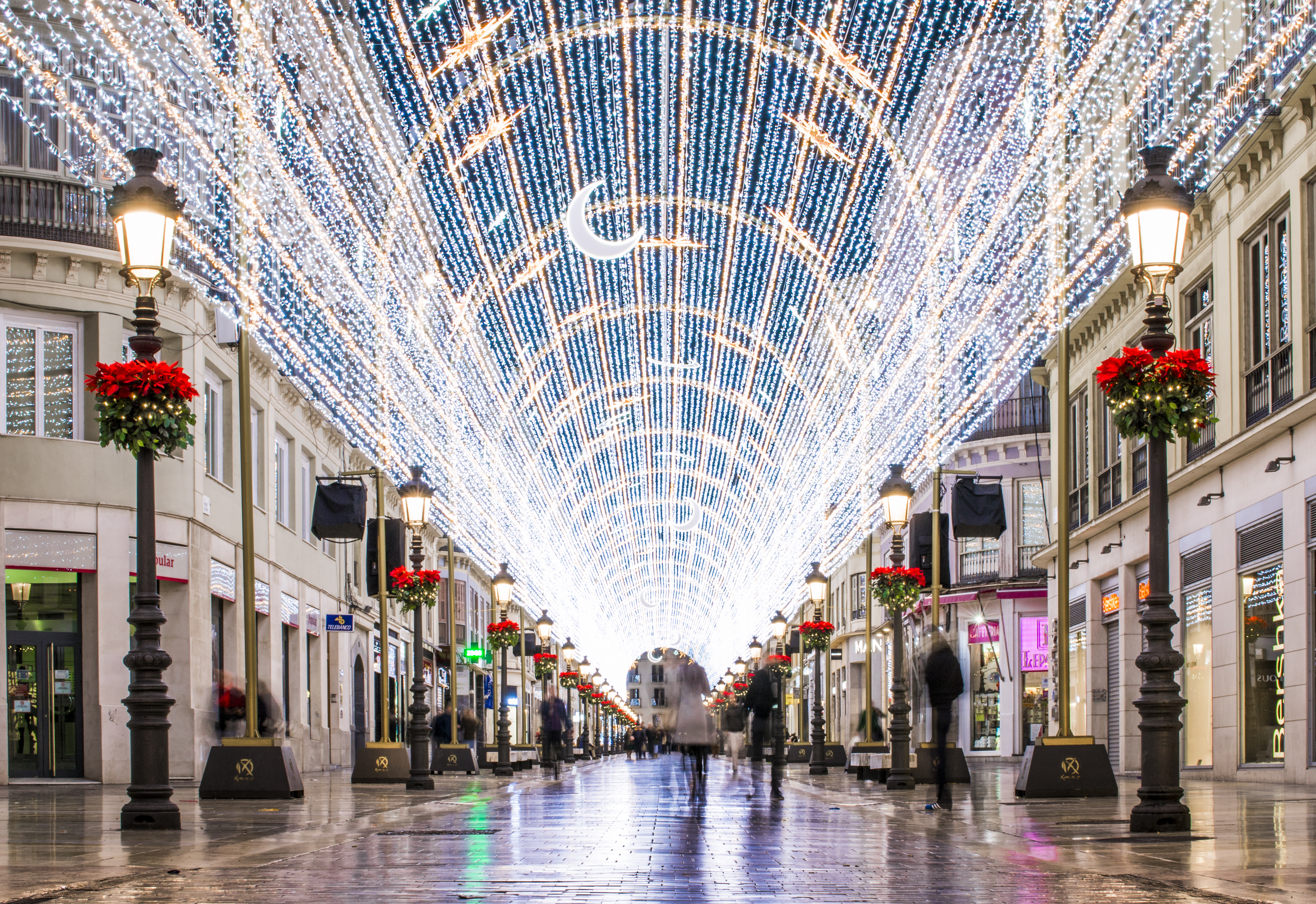
Calle Larios decorated for Christmas in 2016

The street hosts many of the city's top events, including Málaga Fashion Week.

== See also ==
- List of shopping streets and districts by city
