= Museo Picasso Málaga =

Museum in Málaga, Andalusia, Spain

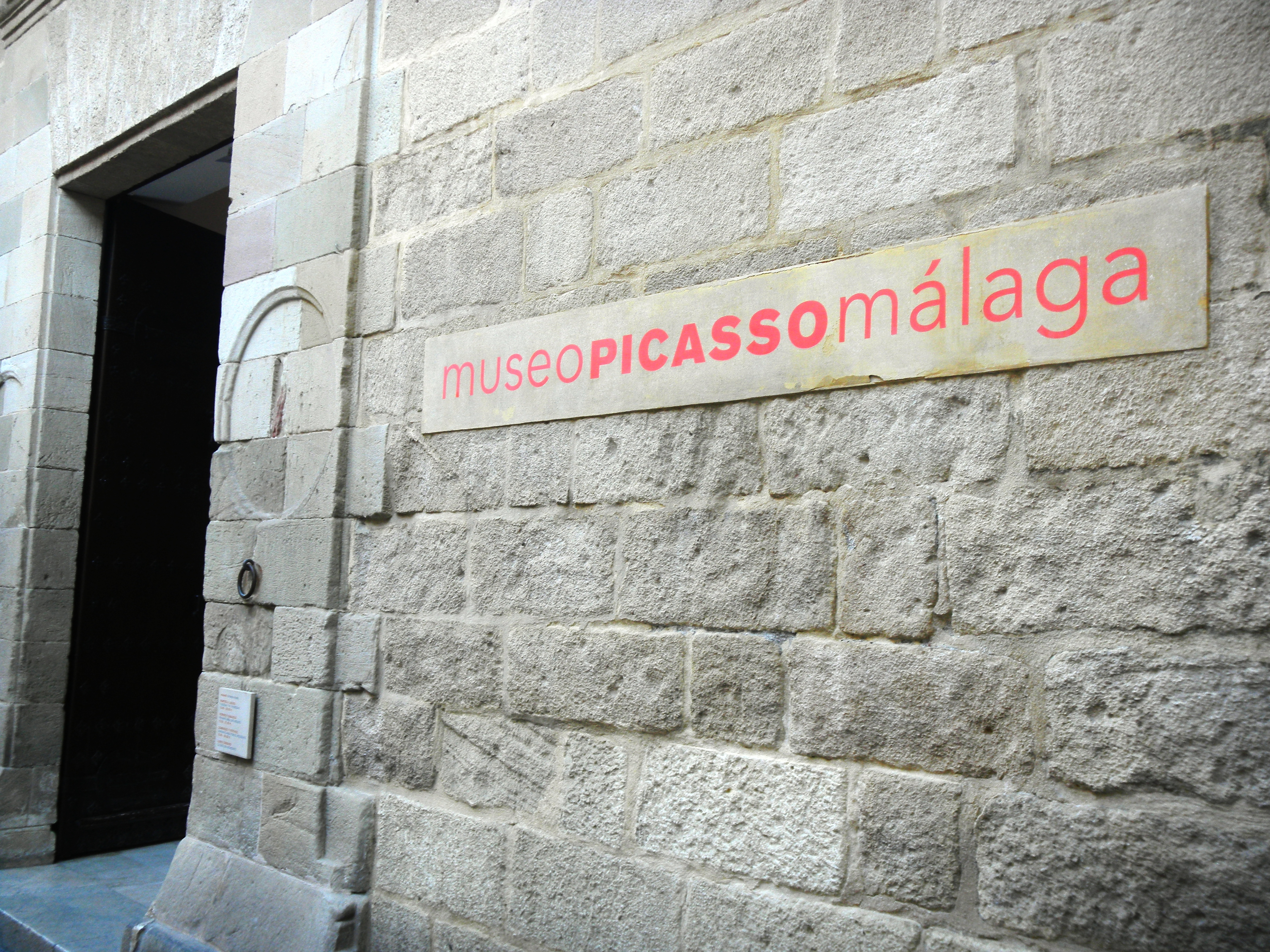
- Established: 2003
- Location: Málaga, Spain
- Coordinates: 36°43′18″N 4°25′06″W
- Visitors: 391.319 (2011)
- Director: José Lebrero
- Website: http://www.museopicassomalaga.org/

The Museo Picasso Málaga is a museum in Málaga, Andalusia, Spain, the city where artist Pablo Ruiz Picasso was born. The museum opened in 2003 in the Buenavista Palace, and received 285 works donated by members of Picasso's family. In 2009, the Fundación Paul, Christine y Bernard Ruiz-Picasso who owned a substantial Picasso collection merged with the Fundación Museo Picasso Málaga to expand the collection which is managed by the museum, a part of the collection is on view at Málaga's Plaza de la Merced that was Picasso's birthplace, and is now the Museo Casa Natal ("Birthplace Museum"). The new merged foundation is the "Fundación Museo Picasso Málaga. Legado Paul, Christine y Bernard Ruiz-Picasso" ("Museo Picasso Málaga Foundation. The Paul, Christine and Bernard Ruiz Picasso Legacy").

== Founding and collection ==
The idea of a Picasso museum in the city of the artist's birth was first seriously discussed in 1953, during the Franco era. The artist was in touch with Juan Temboury Álvarez, the Provincial Delegate for Fine Arts in Málaga, and this very building was discussed as a possible site but nothing came of it. Christine Ruiz-Picasso, widow of the artist's eldest son Paulo Ruiz-Picasso, worked with Málaga to help put on the exhibitions Picasso Clásico ("Classic Picasso") in 1992 and Picasso, primera mirada, ("Picasso, the first glimpse") in 1994. This led in 1996 to rekindling the idea of a major Picasso museum in Málaga. The museum opened 17 October 2003, with the king and queen of Spain in attendance.

Christine Ruiz-Picasso donated 14 paintings, 9 sculptures, 44 individual drawings, a sketchbook with a further 36 drawings, 58 engravings, and 7 ceramic pieces, 133 works in all. Her son, Picasso's grandson, Bernard Ruiz-Picasso donated another 5 paintings, 2 drawings, 10 engravings, and 5 ceramics, for an overall total of 155 works. The collection ranges from early academic studies to cubism to his late re-workings of Old Masters. Many additional pieces are on long-term loan to the museum. There is also a library and archive including over 800 titles on Picasso, as well as relevant documents and photographs.

== The building ==
The Buenavista Palace (Spanish: Palacio de Buenavista) was originally built in the first half of the 16th century for Diego de Cazalla, over the remains of a Nasrid palace of which some elements still survive. It was declared a National Monument in 1939 and housed a previous fine arts museum 1961–1997, when it was acquired with the intention of converting it into the present museum. Adjoining buildings were adapted and built before the 2003 opening. Besides the palace itself, the museum incorporates 18 houses from the old judería (Jewish quarter).

Taken as a whole—both the palace and other buildings—the museum has of 8,300 square metres (89,000 sq ft) of floor space. The museum makes major use of natural light, especially through skylights.

=== Conversion of the building ===
The conversion of the building for the Museo Picasso was a major undertaking, led by the American architect Richard Gluckman, along with Isabel Cámara and Rafael Martín Delgado. Gluckman was something of a known quantity in Málaga, having previously successfully remodeled the city's Episcopal Palace as an exhibition space. The project was budgeted at over 2,000 million pesetas, about US$20 million. The start of the project was delayed three months to get permission from the city for the existing buildings that would be demolished.

Gluckman originally considered a simple rehabilitation of the palace, but soon decided on a different course. The palace itself would not be big enough for the contemplated museum, and they went about acquiring adjacent buildings and land, and getting permission to incorporate or destroy various existing buildings. An initial plan was presented in July 1998; it was later expanded to include more space for a library/documentation center, an auditorium, and an educational department. The result was a decision to incorporate and refurbish several nearby historic buildings that were in disrepair. The ultimate design placed the modern buildings for offices and the new auditorium in and among a set of restored 18th and 19th century buildings.

The excavations for the work led to remarkable discoveries: remnants of a city wall and towers dating back to the Phoenicians, of a Roman factory to produce the fish-based sauce garum, and also of the earlier Nasrid palace on the same site. As a result, the basement is effectively an archeological museum in its own right, visible from above through transparent panels in the floor.

Many of the most difficult aspects of the conversion are precisely the ones that cannot be seen by the casual visitor. A purpose-built museum can take considerations of temperature, humidity, and cleanliness of air into account from the start of the design. When working with a 450-year-old palace, matters are not so simple, and are even more complex when one is resolved to change the ambience of the rooms—especially the exhibition halls—as little as possible. In particular ductwork must be well hidden, but running through the walls is also a very complicated matter, because one must not weaken the building's structure. This problem was solved in part through making air conditioning vents out of white marble slabs with pseudo-Mudéjar design elements, integrated into the walls. Similar techniques were applied to lighting considerations: modern technology in ancient disguise. In This approach of mixing the modern and the historical was put particularly to the test in March 2002, when a fire broke out, damaging three of the halls destined to be exhibition spaces. The damaged 16th century coffered ceilings were recreated by the Madrid-based Taujel company, combining traditional craftsmanship with computer design techniques.

Gluckman's firm received a 2005 Design Award from the American Institute of Architects for the project. Still, historian María Salinas Ruiz of Málaga was not at all pleased by the undertaking, criticizing the sacrifice of two houses with listed historical status and the major modifications to the palace itself, destroying "its marvelous spaces, its flooring, its winding passages and its fountains" that took such advantage of the light at different times of day. Others have spoken of how well the resulting galleries display Picasso's work.

== Picasso and the Calle San Agustín ==
The Museo Picasso Málaga is only 200 metres (660 ft) from the Plaza de la Merced, where Picasso was born, and is located in the Calle San Agustín, to which Picasso and his family had no small connection. Although he moved away from Málaga at the age of 10, Picasso went to nursery school on that street, and his father José Ruiz Picasso was curator of the city museum in the old town hall, also on that street. That museum had an excellent collection of the city's main artists, but for budgetary reasons was seldom open to the public. Because of the same budgetary issues, part of the elder Picasso's compensation was space for his own painting studio, where the younger Picasso did some of his first artwork. Furthermore, from the windows of the new staircases added for the museum, one can see the tower of the church of Santiago, where Picasso was baptized.

== See also ==
- Fundación Picasso, which operates a second, smaller Picasso museum in Málaga
- List of museums in Spain
- List of single-artist museums
- Musée Picasso (Paris)
- Museu Picasso (Barcelona)
