= Plaza de la Constitución (Málaga) =

Plaza de la constitución
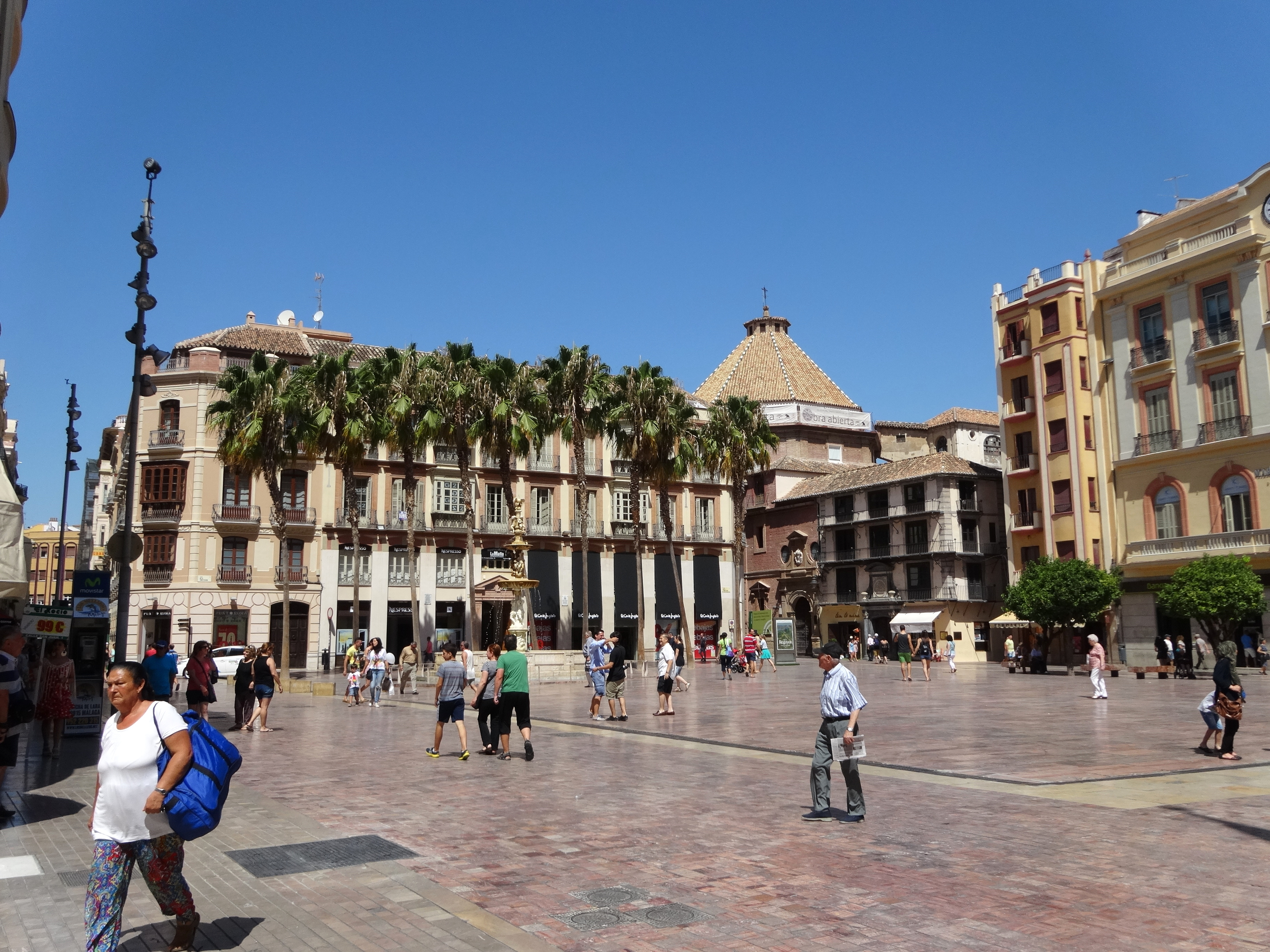
- Interactive map of Plaza de la constitución
- Former name: Plaza de las Cuatro Calles
- Owner: Ayuntamiento de Málaga
- Coordinates: 36.7211°N 4.4220°W
- Major junctions: Calle Marqués de Larios

Plaza de la Constitución is a public square in the city center of Málaga, Spain.

== Notable features ==
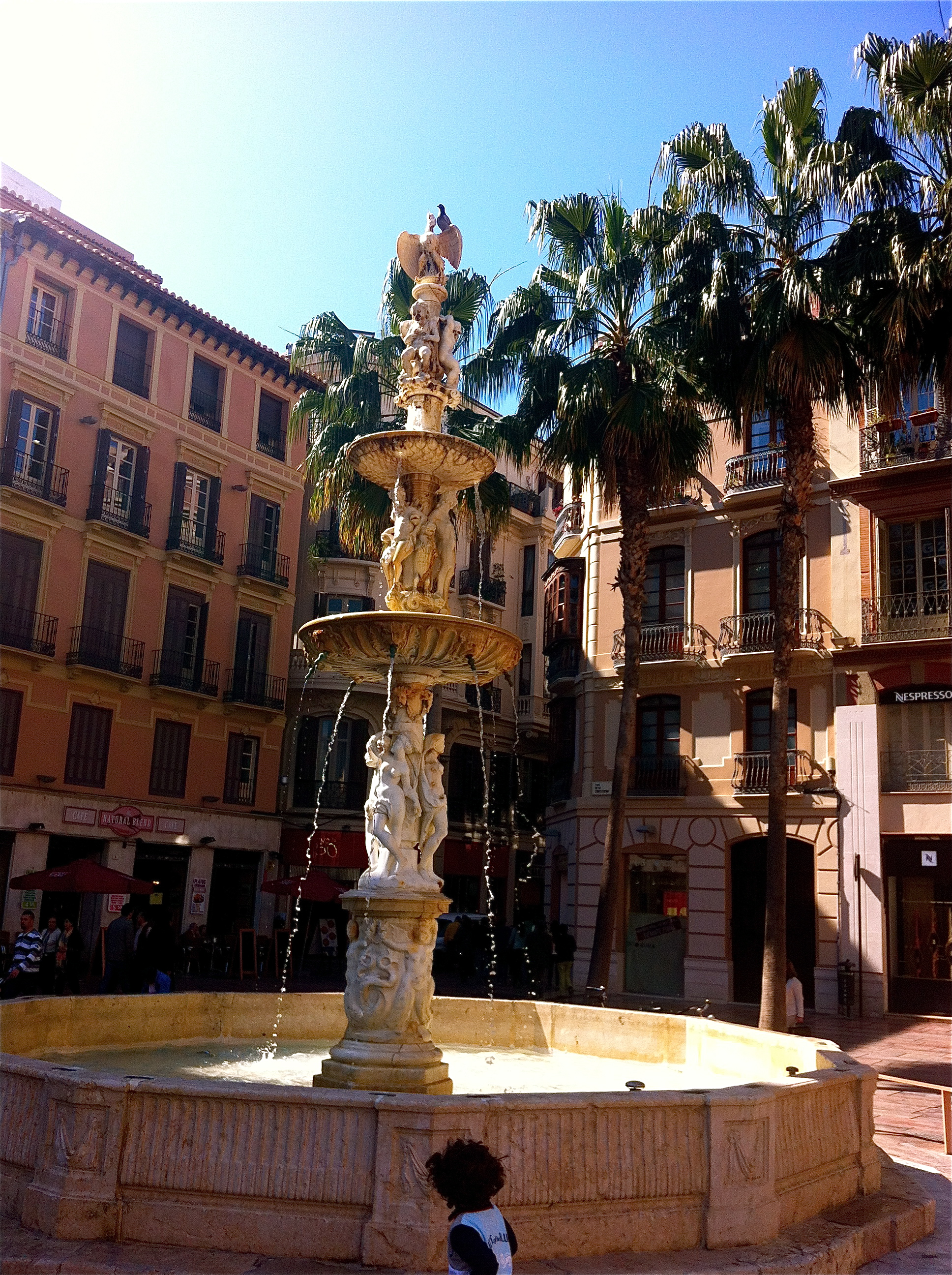
Fuente de Génova

- Fuente de Génova (Genoa Fountain): is a sixteenth-century marble fountain that has been located in the plaza since 2003.
- The Sociedad Económica de Amigos del País (Economic Foundation of the Friends of the Country): an 18th-century building that was formerly a maritime consul and later a Jesuit School

== History ==
The plaza has been a major town square since the time of the Reconquista when it was known as "Plaza de las Cuatro Calles" ("Four streets square"). It was also previously known as the Plaza mayor ("Main town square"). In 1812 it was renamed "Plaza de la constitución."

Málaga's city hall was located in the plaza until 1869. Other former occupants of the plaza include: The Casa del Corregidor (Mayor's home), the city jail, the Audiencia, and the convent of the Augustines.

In 2002, the Plaza was transformed into a pedestrian square, along with Málaga's Calle Larios.

== Festivals and Events ==
The plaza is a key location for the Feria de Málaga, which takes place every August, and the Holy Week celebrations in Málaga.

The city of Málaga's traditional New Year's Eve celebration is held in the plaza every year.
