= Caleta de Velez =

Coordinates: 36.7333°N 4.0500°W

Caleta de Vélez

- Location within Spain
- Country: Spain
- Province: Málaga
- Comarca: Axarquía

Area
  - Total: 4.2 km^{2} (1.6 sq mi)
- Elevation: 15 m (49 ft)

Population (2012)
  - Total: 3,659
  - Density: 870/km^{2} (2,300/sq mi)
- Time zone: UTC+1 (CET)
  - Summer (DST): UTC+2 (CEST)
- Website: Official website

Caleta de Vélez is a village in the Spanish province of Málaga, Andalusia. It belongs to Vélez-Málaga and it is in Axarquía. It is 35 kilometers away from Málaga. Its population is about 3659 people. It has 4.2 km^{2} of area.

== Geography ==
It is on the shores of the Mediterranean Sea, between Torre del Mar and Algarrobo-Costa and has a beach.

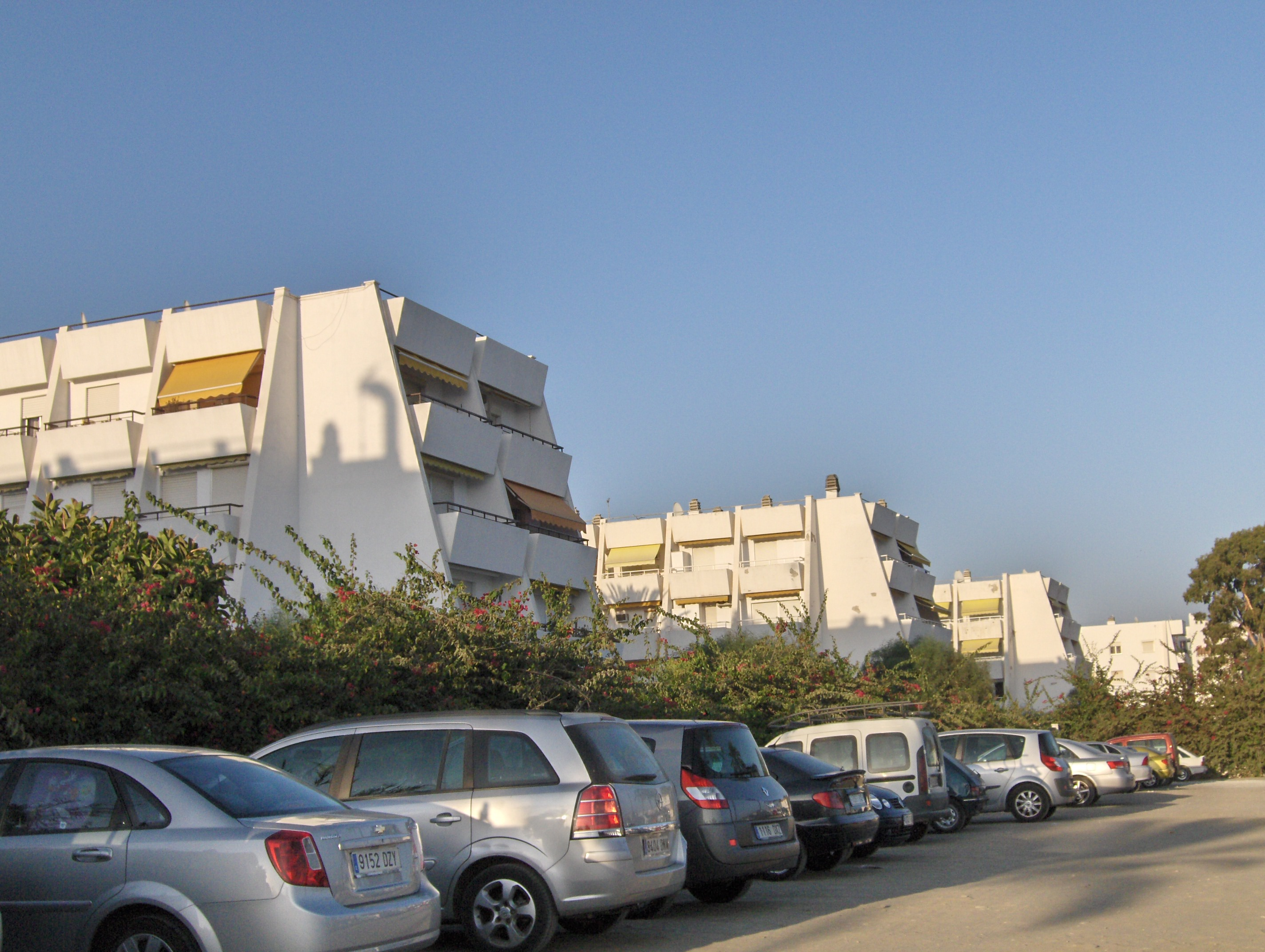
Buildings in Caleta near the beach.

== Transport ==
=== Roads ===
The Autovía A-7, (Autovia del Mediterraneo) passes to the north and the N340 crosses Caleta de Vélez closer to the coast.

=== Bus ===
This two routes of ALSA stop in Caleta de Vélez:

- Line Málaga - Nerja
- Line Málaga - Torrox

There is also a line of local bus Caleta de Vélez - Almayate.

=== Boats ===
Caleta de Vélez has a sea port.

== Culture ==
=== Gastronomy ===
Its gastronomy is based on Mediterranean food, such as fish soups, "pescaito" or avocado.
