= Bentomiz Castle =

Coordinates: 36.804028°N 4.043956°W

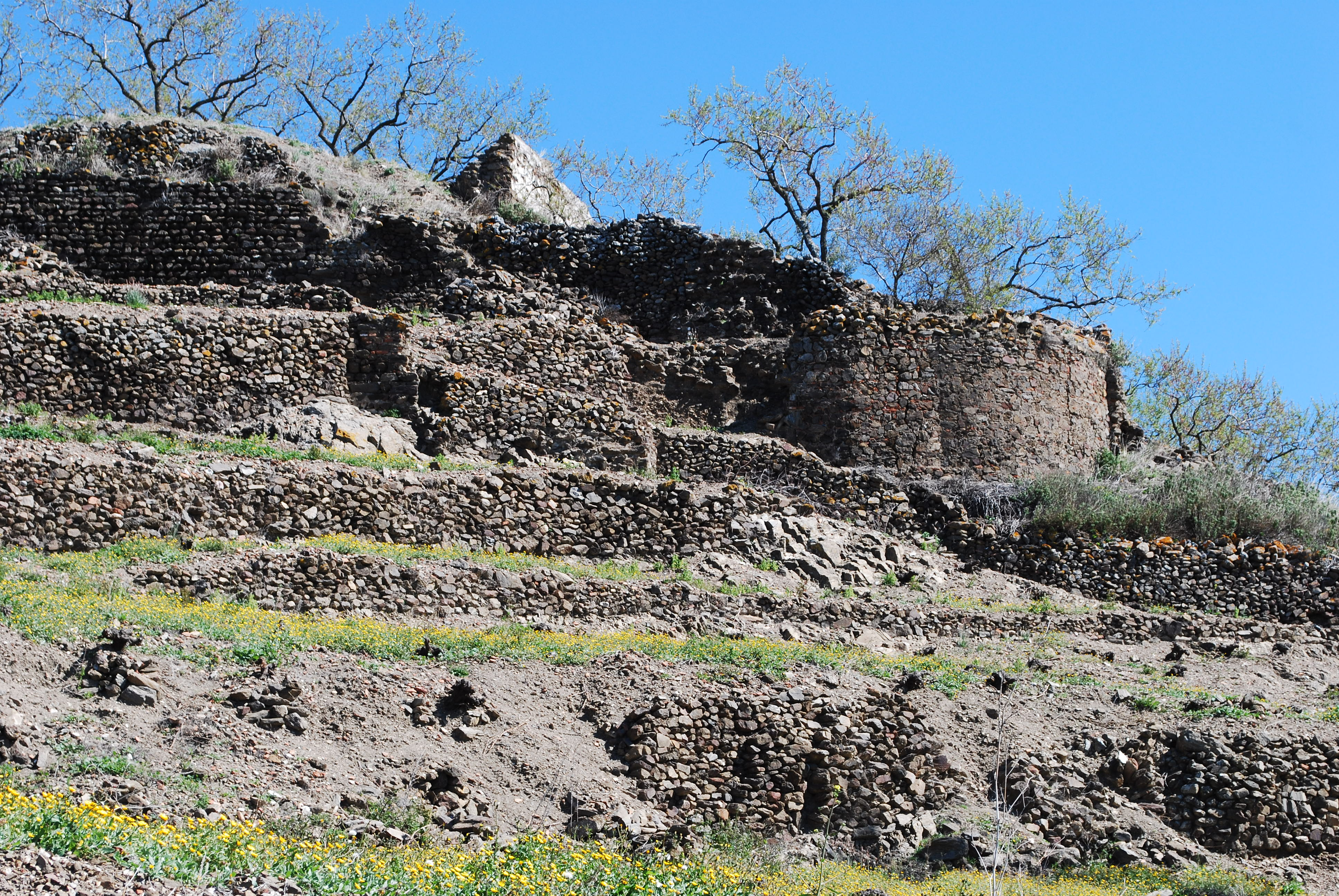

Bentomiz Castle is an ancient Moorish fortress built on a hill near the village of Arenas in the province of Málaga. It sits at a height of 711 metres (2,333 ft), and lies to the northeast of Vélez-Málaga.

The castle site is thought to have been occupied by the Phoenicians, Greeks and Romans, although it is not clear which parts of the ruins date to which period. Roman baths have been found there. The berbers built on the existing structure. The fortress, then called Munt Mās, was mentioned in the memoirs of Abdallah ibn Buluggin, ruler of the Taifa of Granada in the eleventh century. He described it as a formidable stronghold. The fortress surrendered to him during a civil war that he fought with his brother Tamim.

When Ferdinand II of Aragon reached the area en route to Vélez-Málaga, in the campaign that culminated in the Siege of Málaga (1487), the Granadan Sultan El Zagal brought a force to oppose them which he stationed around the Bentomiz castle. The Moors attacked the Christian siege train during the night of 25 April 1487 but were repulsed, and in panic retreated towards Granada. The castle was taken over by the Catholic Monarchs in 1487 and maintained as a defensive post. The castle is now ruined, but there are still towers, walls and underground chambers.
