= Benajarafe =

- Location within Spain
- Coordinates: 36°43′05″N 4°11′45″W
- Country: Spain
- Autonomous community: Andalusia
- Province: Málaga
- Municipality: Vélez-Málaga

Population (2023)
  - Total: 3,863
- Postal code: 29790
- Area codes: for multiple area codes

Benajarafe is a town located on the coast of the municipality of Vélez-Málaga, Spain, in the heart of Axarquia, a region that lies on the Eastern Costa del Sol, in the province of Málaga. It is located 9 kilometres from Torre del Mar and 20 kilometres from the provincial capital Málaga. It enjoys one of the best climates in Europe, with summers of full sun and a calm sea that imitates the tranquillity of the town. It is connected by the Mediterranean Motorway (E-15) north of the city, in the direction of Málaga to Almería.

== Geography ==
Benajarafe is divided into two different parts, Benajarafe Alto and Benajarafe Costa. The first one is the main sector of the population. It is mainly composed of a large number of country houses, scattered from the top to the bottom of the town. The people who live there are mainly farmers, and as they are still in the process of urbanization, most of them live in streets without asphalt and even in certain sectors, they are surrounded by streams that swell in the rainy season.

In recent years, a large number of urbanisations have been built, especially on the coast, and in 2005 a large part of the work was completed which resulted in a promenade worthy of a tourist town. The most important thing for the tourism of this town is without any doubt the immense beach that gives it its length of almost 2 kilometres. The National Road 340 separates the beach from the town, giving way to a large amount of traffic that moves preferably between Málaga and Vélez-Málaga, although the creation of the motorway a few kilometres further in has taken most of it.

Nowadays many foreigners, mainly French, German and English, visit the town and many choose it as a place to buy a house in which they can spend the summer or winter.

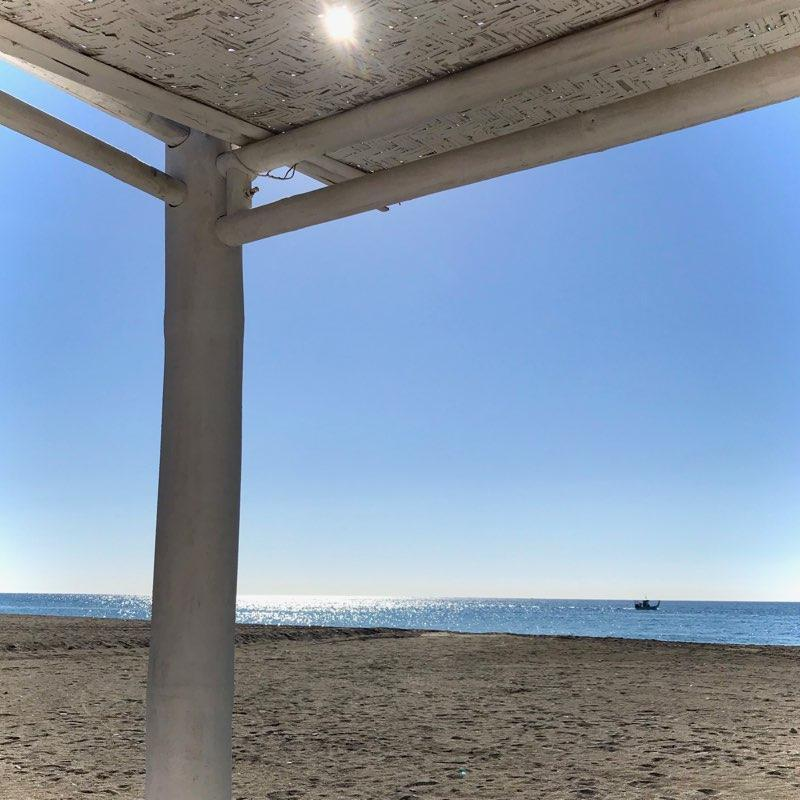
Benajarafe Beach

=== Benajarafe Costa ===
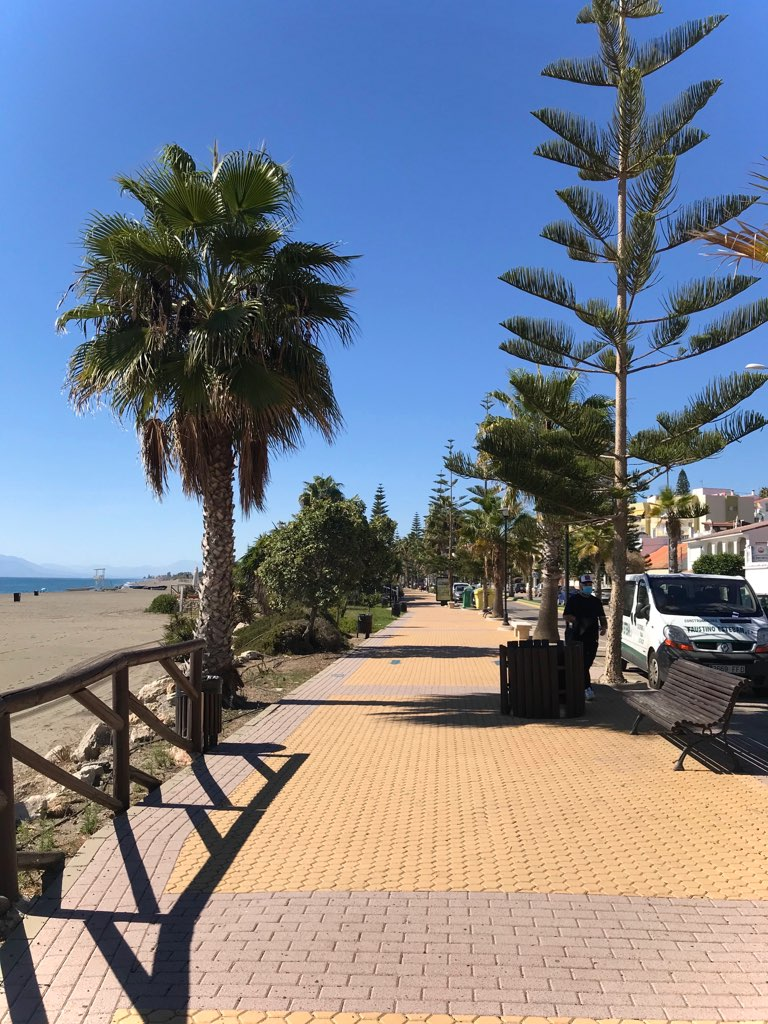
Main street sidewalk

Benajarafe Beach is a dark sand beach with a moderate swell. It is about 1,600 metres long and 30 metres deep and has a series of basic utilities such as pathways, parasols, and showers.

=== Benajarafe Alto ===
The centre of Benajarafe Alto is the hermitage of Nuestra Señora del Rosario, where every October the pilgrimage to the patron saint takes place from the church located in Benajarafe Costa on the back of oxen. This church was restored between the years 1996 and 1999 by the association of neighbours, helped by the Tenencia de Alcaldía

This area of Benajarafe is mainly articulated by a paved road that starts at the mouth of the Adelfas stream and goes up to the Loma del niño perdido and from there numerous dirt roads lead to the homes.

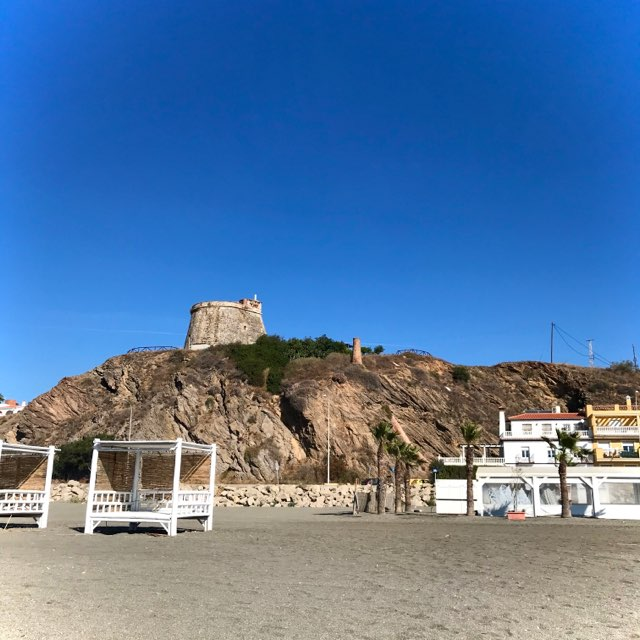
Moya Tower

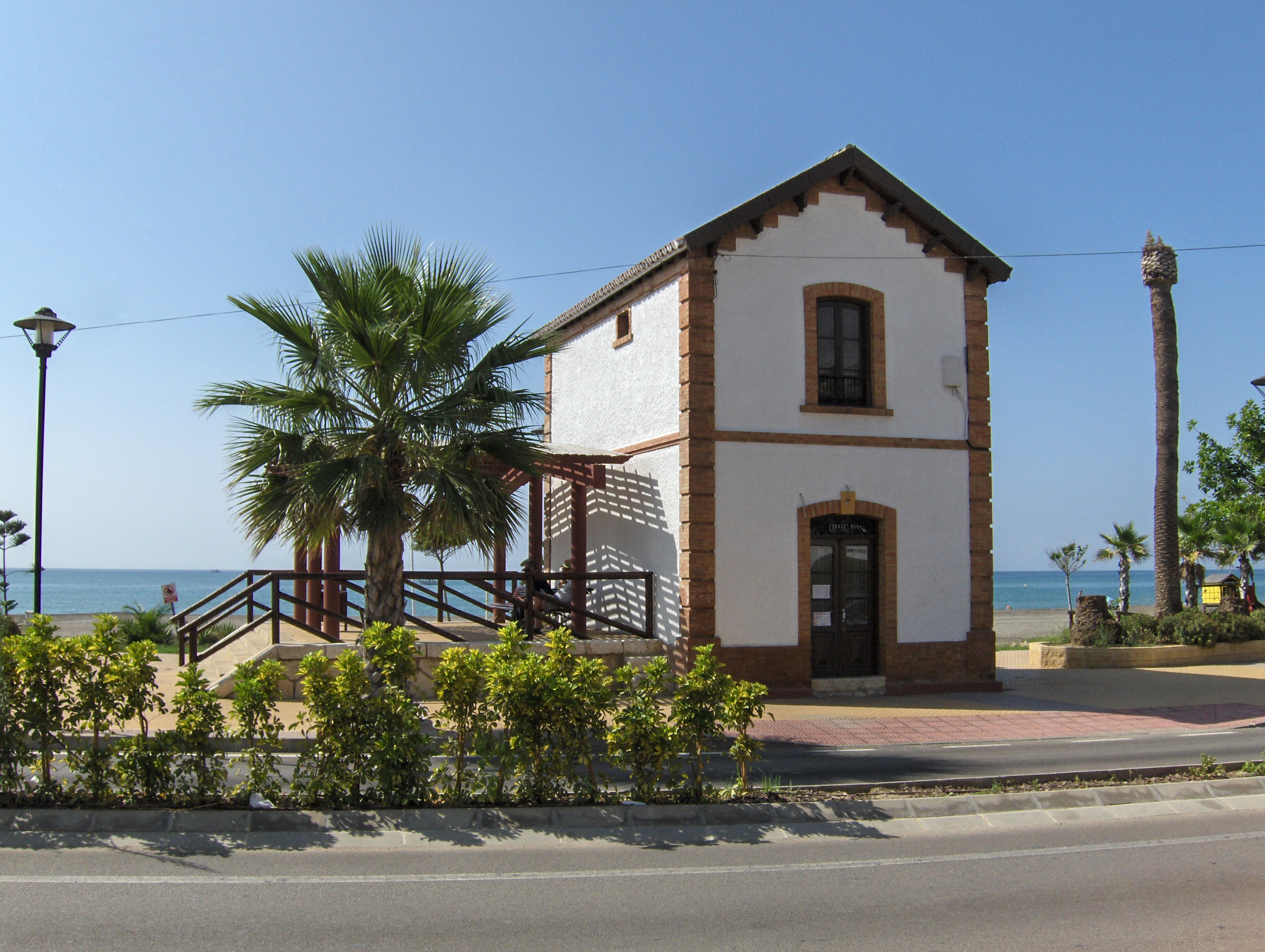
Old Benajarafe train station.

== History ==
Benajarafe has been occupied since the Palaeolithic era. Very close to this place, many historians place the Greek colony of Mainake, whose exact location is still sought after, although the most striking archaeological remains have appeared next to the river Velez, in Torre del Mar.

The name of this town dates back to the time when the Muslims lived there, although it is in itself controversial for the locals. The most widespread interpretation comes from the Arabic Ben ash-Sharif (Son of the Height). Another version refers to the term Bina' ash-Sharaf (بناء الشراف), which means "house (or, more literally, 'construction') on the hill". In 1483 the last Catholic victory in Andalusia took place here, the Battle of La Axarquía, as part of the Granada War.

At this time, one of the most significant features of Benajarafe was built, the Torre Moya (Fat Tower), which receives its name because it is the largest on the coast of Málaga. The purpose of this tower was to alert the inhabitants of the arrival of the pirates who besieged them for centuries from different places. For this purpose, fires were made, using smoke during the day and fire at night.

Another of the most important buildings is the old train station, which ran from Málaga to Ventas de Zafarraya, was moved by coal in its beginnings and by fuel later on. It was one of the main causes for the development of the town, until in the 60's when it was decided to dismantle the line. This narrow-gauge railway made its last journey in 1968.

== Culture ==
One of the main festivals of the year is the Day of Andalusia on February 28, organised by the Neighbourhood Association. The first activity of the day is the raising of the flag. Free meals are usually served and recreational events such as games, dances, poetry readings, etc. are held.

On July 16 the local festival is held, the day of the Virgen del Carmen, which is also a regional festival. The image of the Virgin is carried from the church to the sea, and in the evening, the fair is held.

In October the pilgrimage of the Virgen del Rosario takes place. Two images that symbolise the character of the village, a farmer and a sailor, are carried in procession from the church to the chapel. In this festival it is customary to make a communal paella, in which free dishes are served to all those attending.

In addition to these named fiestas, in Benajarafe, every year in August the popular "Feria" of this town is held, this consists of three days in which the fiesta is held by night and day. From Friday to Sunday, as well as, on Friday there is a big verbena (fair), and Saturday and Sunday famous singers usually come to the town to accompany the party, which is called "until the body holds out". On the last day, Sunday, there is a final event with games and competitions for the children of the village, at the end of which there is a prize giving ceremony for the activities and games carried out. On the first day of the festival (Friday), the queen and the bridesmaids of the fair are chosen, and they must parade with the ribbon on which appears "Queen of the night" or "1st bridesmaid" or "2nd bridesmaid". With these festivities, the people of the town are encouraged to participate in these days, creating a great coexistence.

The town also has a local football team by the name of Club Deportivo Torremoya, which is named after the Moya tower.

== Public transport ==
Intercity buses connect Benajarafe with the towns of Málaga, Torre del Mar, Vélez-Málaga, Nerja, Periana, Riogordo and Almayate. The following lines of the Consorcio de Transporte Metropolitano del Área de Málaga have stops in its territory:

Line Route and Timetable Map

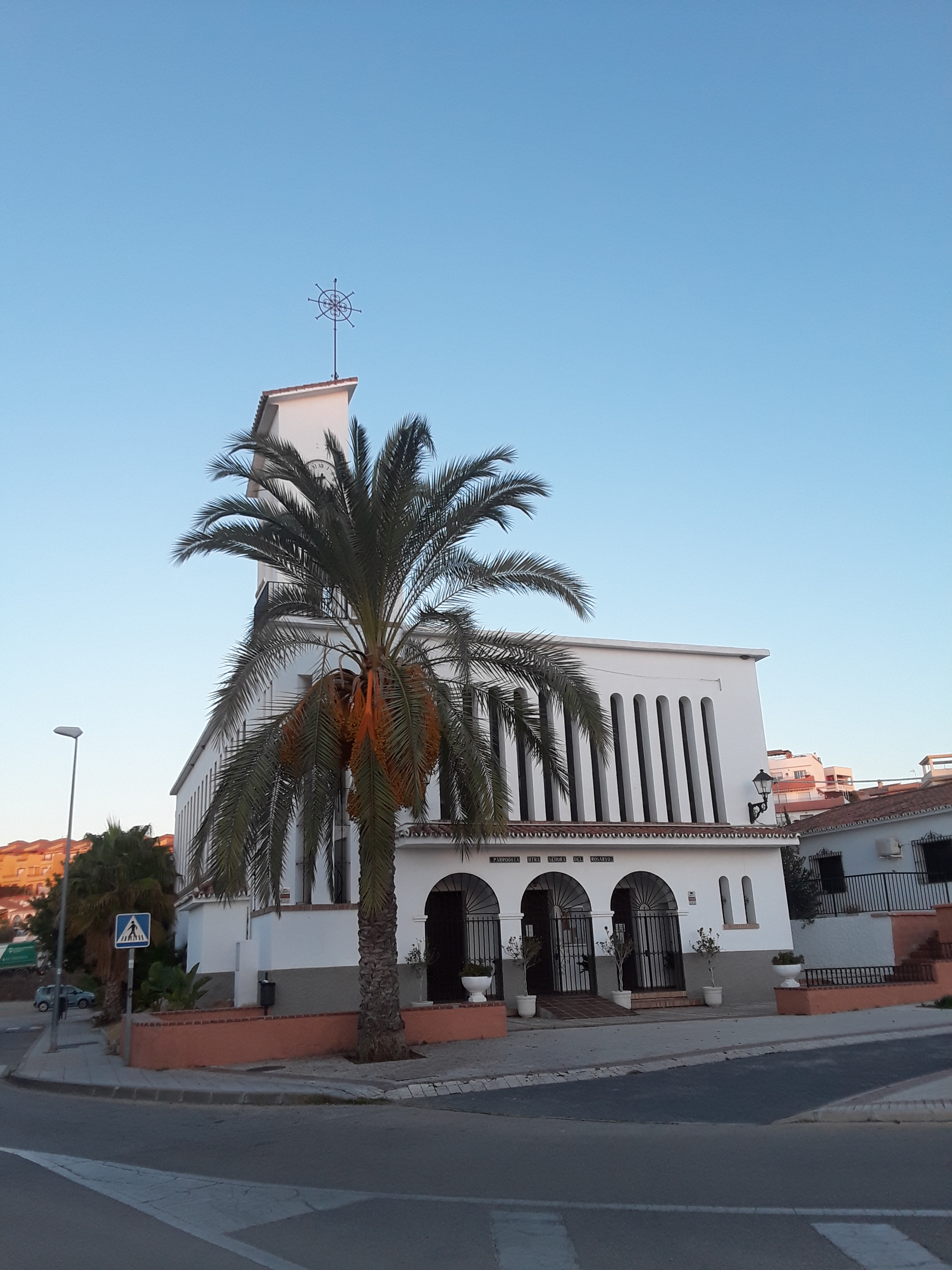
Benajarafe Church

M-260

Málaga-Vélez-Málaga (via the Benagalbón Tower) Route and timetable Map

M-362

Málaga-Nerja (via Torre de Benagalbón) Route and timetable Map

M-363

Málaga-Torrox (via Torre de Benagalbón) Route and timetable Map

M-364

Málaga-Periana (via Torre de Benagalbón) Route and timetable Map

M-365

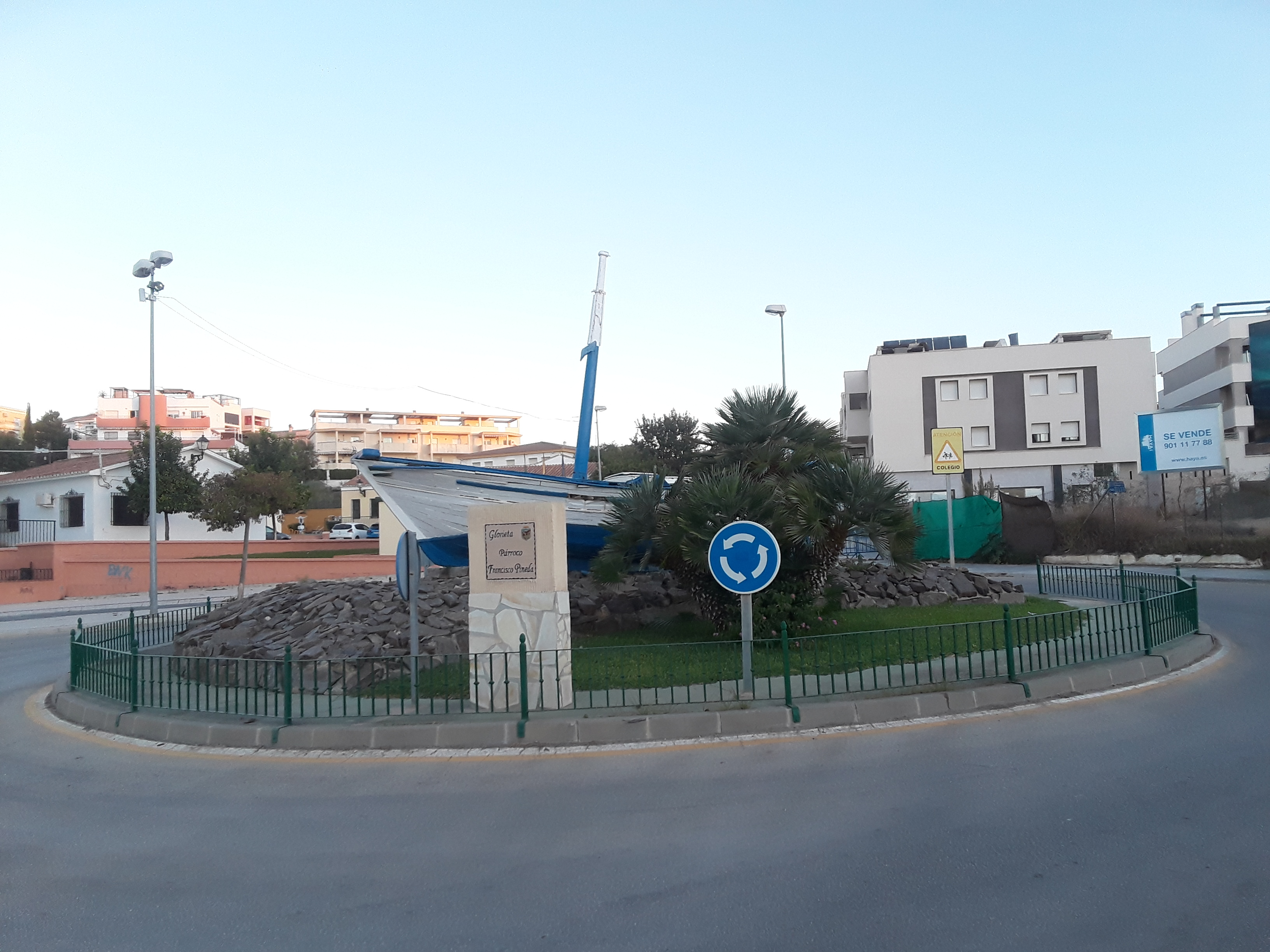
Iconic Fishing Boat Roundabout

Málaga-Riogordo (via Torre de Benagalbón) Route and timetable Map

== See also ==
Benajarafe Beach

Official Andalusia Tourism Website
