= Radio Sol de Almijara =

- Spain
- Frequency: 87.8

Radio Sol de Almijara (RSA) also known as RSA 87.8 FM is a cultural radio station in Nerja, in Southern Spain. RSA broadcasts on the 87.8 FM wavelength and covers the eastern part of Axarquia, on the Costa del Sol, in the east of the province of Málaga, within the Andalucia region of Southern Spain.

RSA is a production of the Asociación Cultural Sol de Almijara, a not for profit association officially registered in Málaga, Spain.
