= San Juan Bautista, Vélez-Málaga =

Coordinates: 36.7826°N 4.1023°W

Church of San Juan Bautista
- Iglesia de San Juan Bautista (Spanish)
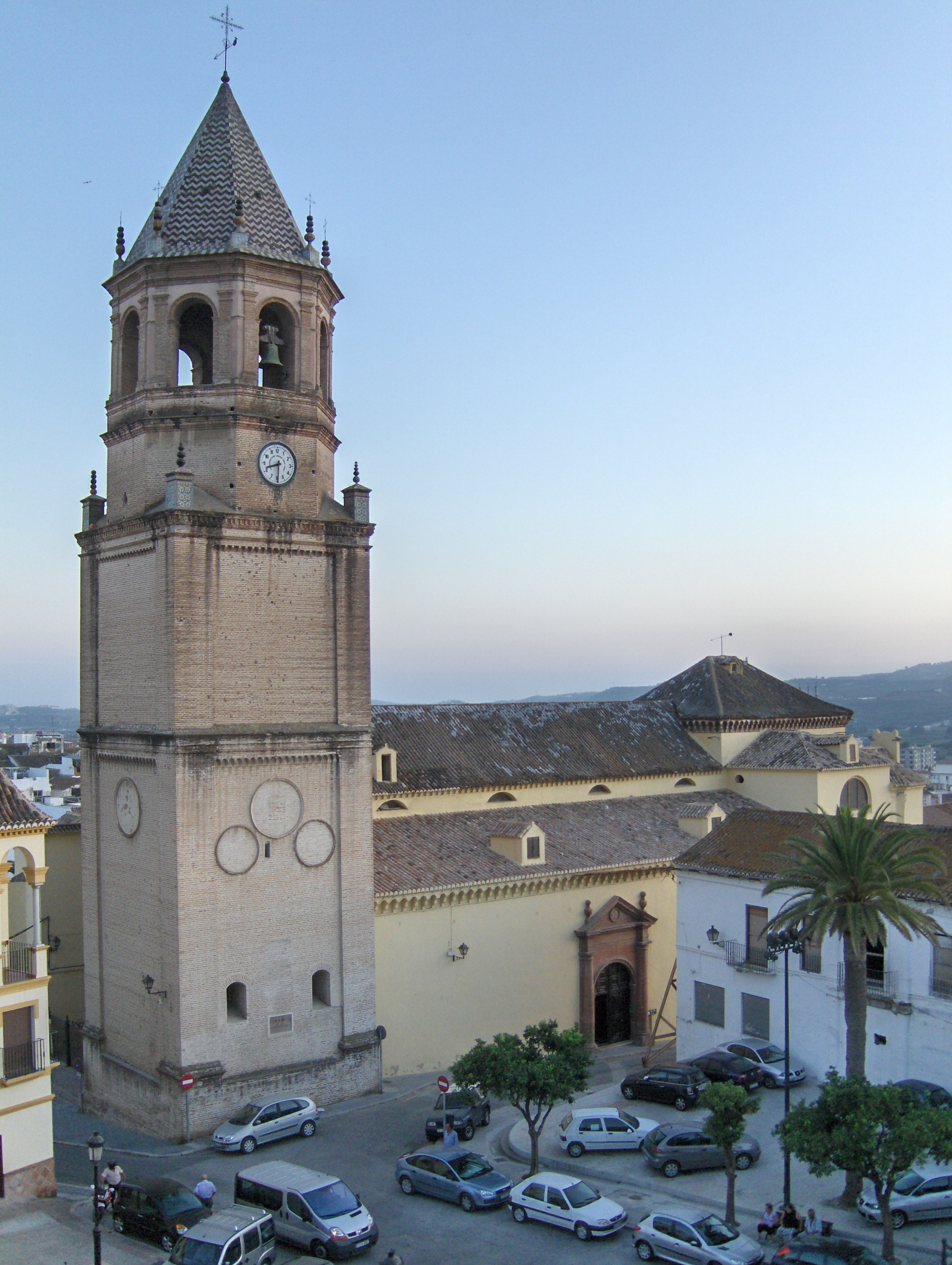

- Location within Spain
- Location: Vélez-Málaga, Spain

History
- Built: 1487

Site notes
- Architectural style: Gothic-Mudejar/Neoclassical

Spanish Cultural Heritage
- Official name: Iglesia de San Juan Bautista
- Type: Non-movable
- Criteria: Monument
- Designated: 2006
- Reference no.: RI-51-0012024

The Iglesia de San Juan Bautista or the Church of San Juan Bautista is a Roman Catholic church dedicated to John the Baptist, in Vélez-Málaga, in the province of Málaga, Spain. It is an art-historical monument that, over time, has undergone multiple architectural changes to its structure based on existing trends.

The original church dates from 1487 and was built in the Gothic-Mudejar style. In that same century it was remodeled and between 1541 and 1564, Fray Bernardo Manrique, the then bishop, carried out further expansion, building the tower at this time.

Significant changes were made during the Baroque period, traces of which still remain. Further reforms were carried out in the late eighteenth century. This involved the decoration of the sacristy, an extraordinary piece, built in 1789, and attributed to José Martín de Aldehuela.

Its portal is accessed through a lobby with Evangelio nave, has fine stucco decoration with vegetal elements and apocalyptic symbols. The main changes carried out to the original church were done between 1853 and 1860, by Bishop Juan Nepomuceno Castellana, from which it acquired its neoclassical imprint. These works were commissioned by attorney Federico Vahey, then minister of Grace and Justice under Isabel II. He ordered the construction of the funerary chapel to be dedicated to the worship of San Federico, now known as the Cristo de las Vigías.
