= Iznate =

- Municipality
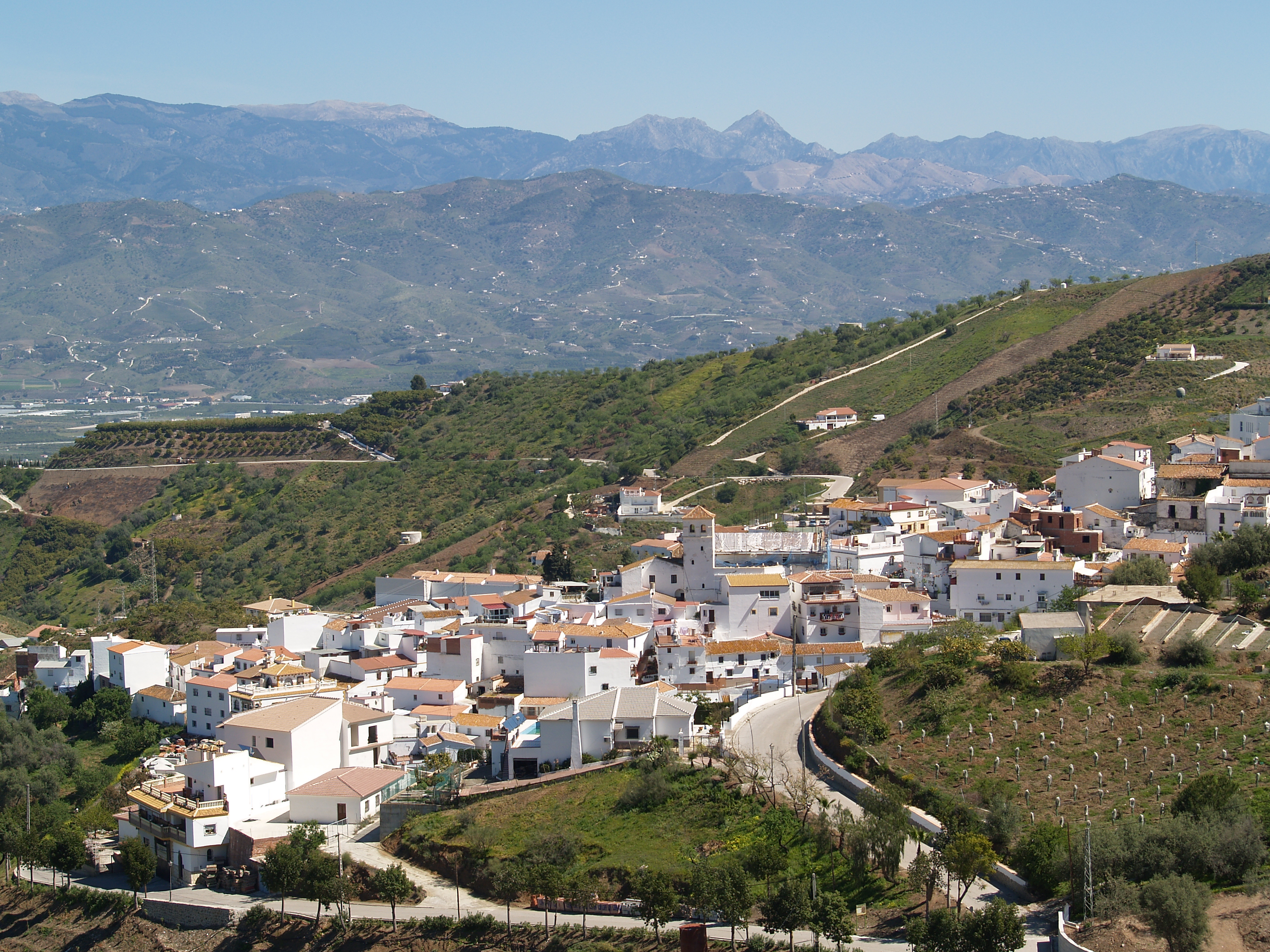
- View of the town

- Coat of arms

- Location in Spain
- Coordinates: 36°46′N 4°41′W
- Sovereign state: Spain
- Autonomous community: Andalusia
- Province: Málaga
- Comarca: Axarquía

Government
  - Mayor: Gregorio A. Campos Marfil (PSOE)

Area
  - Total: 8 km^{2} (3.1 sq mi)
- Elevation: 300 m (980 ft)

Population (2025-01-01)
  - Total: 940
  - Density: 120/km^{2} (300/sq mi)
- Demonym: Iznateños
- Time zone: UTC+1 (CET)
  - Summer (DST): UTC+2 (CEST)
- Postal code: 29792
- Website: Official website

Iznate is a town and municipality in the province of Málaga, part of the autonomous community of Andalusia in southern Spain. It is located in the comarca of La Axarquía. The municipality is situated approximately 12 kilometers from Vélez-Málaga and 45 km from the provincial capital Málaga. The Iznate river passes through Iznate.

The origin of the word Iznate can be traced to the Arab root "hisnat", which means "castle". Therefore, Hins Aute means the Castle of Aute.

== Main sights ==
- Church of St. Gregory (late 16th century)
- Spring of les Tres Deseos, dating to Moorish times
- Spring of Moguera, alo of Moorish origin

== See also ==
- List of municipalities in Málaga
