= Benamocarra =

- Municipality
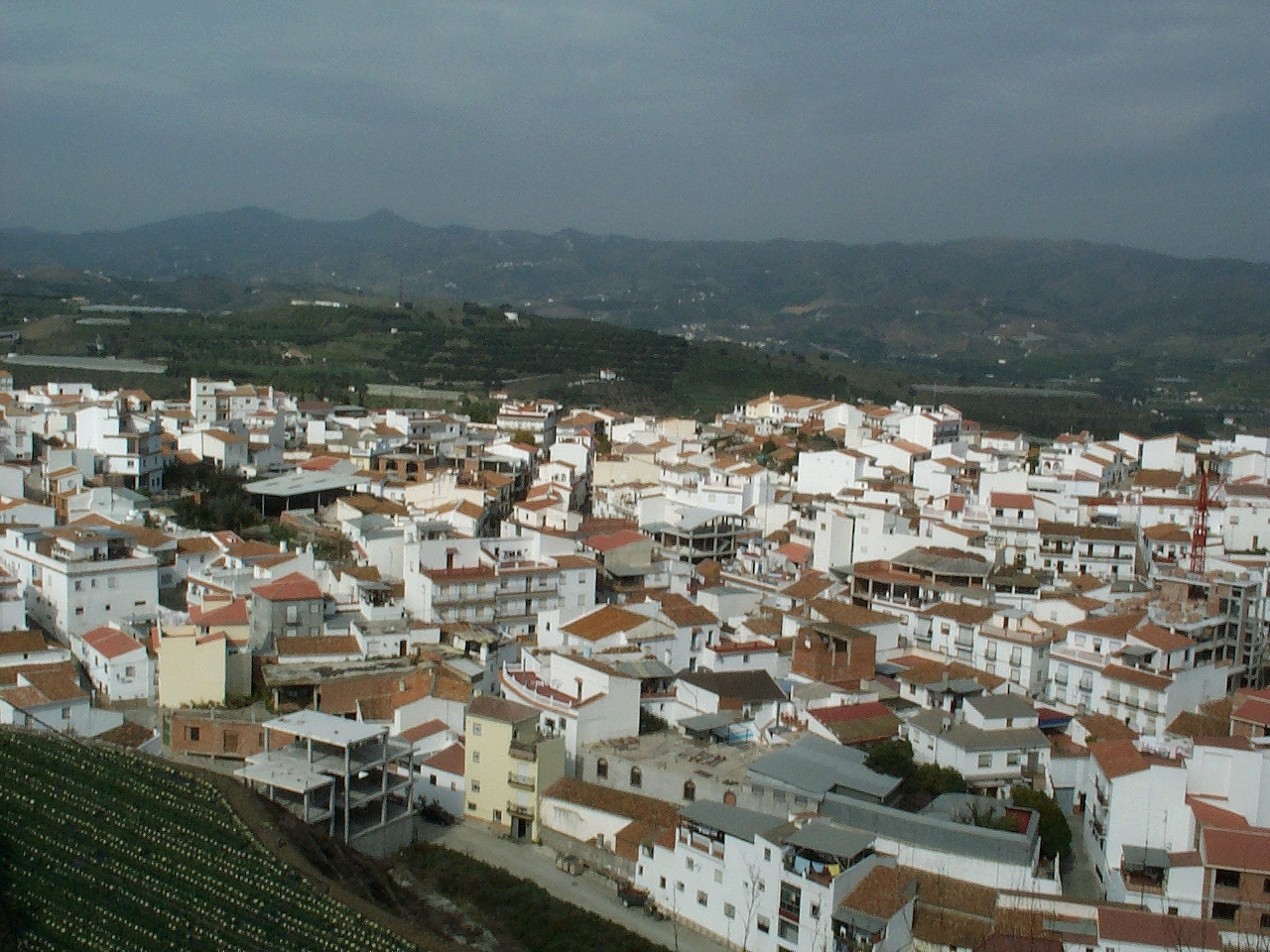

- Flag Coat of arms

- Location in Province of Málaga Location in Spain Location in Andalusia
- Country: Spain
- Autonomous community: Andalusia
- Province: Málaga
- Comarca: La Axarquía

Government
  - Type: Ayuntamiento
  - Mayor (Alcalde): Abdeslam Jesús Aoulad Ben Salem Lucena (Por Mi Pueblo/Partido Andalucista)

Area
  - Total: 6 km^{2} (2.3 sq mi)
- Elevation: 145 m (476 ft)

Population (2025-01-01)
  - Total: 3,200
  - Density: 530/km^{2} (1,400/sq mi)
- Time zone: UTC+1 (CET)
  - Summer (DST): UTC+2 (CEST)
- Website: benamocarra.es

Benamocarra is a town and municipality in the Province of Málaga, part of the autonomous community of Andalusia in southern Spain. The municipality is situated approximately 5 kilometres from Vélez-Málaga and 41 from Málaga, the provincial capital. It has a population of approximately 3,000 residents. The natives are called Benamocarreños.

== See also ==
- List of municipalities in Málaga
