= Vélez-Málaga =

Place in Málaga, Spain

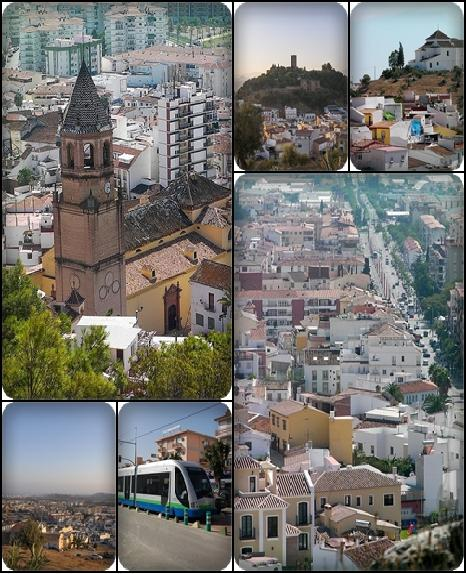
- Collage of Vélez-Malaga. Top left: San Juan Bautista Church, top middle: View of Vélez-Málaga Fortress, from Remedios Hill, top right: View of Los Remedios Hermitage, from San Cristbal Hills, bottom left: View of downtown Vélez-Málaga, from Ermita Remedious Hill, bottom middle: Vélez-Málaga tramway, near Torre del Mar Beach, bottom right: View of Vivar Tellez Avenue from San Cristbal Hills.

- Flag Coat of arms

- Location within Province of Málaga Location within Andalusia Location within Spain
- Coordinates: 36°47′N 4°6′W
- Sovereign state: Spain
- Autonomous community: Andalusia
- Province: Málaga
- Comarca: Axarquía

Government
  - Mayor: Jesús Lupiáñez Herrera

Area
  - Total: 157.88 km^{2} (60.96 sq mi)
- Elevation: 60 m (200 ft)

Population (2025-01-01)
  - Total: 86,048
  - Density: 545.02/km^{2} (1,411.6/sq mi)
- Time zone: UTC+1 (CET)
  - Summer (DST): UTC+2 (CEST)
- Website: Official website

Vélez-Málaga (Spanish pronunciation: [ˈbeleθ ˈmalaɣa]), locally known as Vélez, is a municipality, the capital (and the most important city) of the Axarquía comarca in the province of Málaga, in the Spanish autonomous community of Andalusia. Vélez-Málaga is the headquarters of the Commonwealth of Municipalities of Costa del Sol-Axarquía. The municipality forms part of the Costa del Sol region.

Vélez-Málaga itself is a market city and "bustling market town and supply centre for the region's farmers", 4 km inland from Torre del Mar but unlike the coastal resort not dominated by the tourist industry.

== Population ==
The population of Vélez Málaga in 2015 is 78,166. In 2010, the population of the municipality of Vélez-Málaga surpassed 75,000 inhabitants, being the fourth most populous municipality of the province, behind the capital, Marbella and Mijas. In general, the demographic growth of Vélez Málaga has been high in the last decades. The population is formed by people from all corners of La Axarquía, as well as by population alien to it. It is necessary to emphasize a great community of gypsies, that concentrates mainly in the districts of La Villa, La Gloria, Carabanchel and Las Malvinas.

Foreigners without Spanish nationality according to 2008 data were 8923. Of these, the largest group is from Romania, which represents about 13% of the total number of foreigners.12 There is also a small Chinese community, dedicated to restaurants and shops; People from Muslim countries, mostly from Morocco; Of countries in sub-Saharan Africa; As well as from Community countries, mainly German and British, and from Eastern Europe. The main center of the municipality is the town of Vélez-Málaga proper, located in the interior a few kilometers from the coast. The following nuclei in importance by population are Torre del Mar and Caleta de Velez, located on the coast. These three nuclei, which are very close to each other, are increasingly close to each other because of the population that forms part of the town or town and is linked by the Avenida del Rey Juan Carlos I and Paseo Marítimo.

Along the coast are other smaller towns such as Almayate, Valle-Niza, Benajarafe and Chilches, on the western side, and Mezquitilla and Lagos, on the eastern side. In the interior they stand out: Cajiz, Los Pepones, Trapiche, Triana and Cabrillas Different nuclei of population of the Metropolitan Area of Vélez Málaga.14 Metropolitan area of Vélez Málaga [edit] The metropolitan area of Vélez Málaga has 92,928 inhabitants. The metropolitan area of Vélez Málaga is formed by the municipalities of: Vélez Málaga, Algarrobo, Benamocarra, La Viñuela, Benamargosa, Arenas and Iznate. It is the eighteenth most populous metropolitan area of Andalusia.

Municipality	Population
Vélez Málaga	78,166
Algarrobo	6,016
Benamocarra	3,047
La Viñuela	2,013
Benamargosa	1,568
Arenas	1.219
Iznate	899
Total	92.928

== History ==
Old Age

Although vestiges dating from the Iron Age in the old town of Vélez-Málaga have been found, the first solid news is due to the Phoenicians, who settled on the coast of the present municipality from the 8th century BC. C., preferably in estuaries of the rivers, as they document the archaeological sites of Tuscan and Chorreras. The remains of nozzles and slag found the exploitation of iron metallurgy, an activity to which port and commercial was linked, as is seen in the area of Manganeto, where the original Phoenician jetty of this settlement and the Greek amphoras Containers of attic oil found in this enclave. This pier should have been used extensively for the mooring of Phoenician vessels in development, initially, of its important fishing activity. Of the Roman occupation, evidences are in different deposits, but especially in the one of Cerro del Mar, remains of what was the necropolis of the maritime city of Maenoba, located in the area of Torre del Mar. The Romans developed the salting industry And the production of garum, whose bases had already settled the Phoenicians. Also in this time they developed an incipient agriculture and the fishing.

Middle Ages

It was in Moorish times when the urban nucleus of Vélez-Málaga, whose name derives from: Ballax, Ballix, Aballix or Ballix-Malica. The Muslim city was structured with the fortress in the highest point of the population, of great defensive and strategic value, extending in the western slope of the mount, in what today is known as La Villa. Between the thirteenth and fifteenth centuries, Vélez-Málaga was one of the most important cities of the Nazari Kingdom of Granada, as witnessed by authors such as Idrisi, Abulfeda, Ibn Battuta, Ibn Asim and Abd-al-Basit. The population growth experienced by the city in this period would result in the overflow of the fortified area and the appearance of suburbs in the areas of what today constitute the neighborhood of Arroyo de San Sebastián and the area of Pajarillo, on the slope of Cerro Of the Remedies. In the surroundings of the medina, in addition, there were a series of farms that are the origin of the nuclei of Almayate, Benajarafe and Cajiz among others. Before the unstoppable advance of the Crown of Castile over the Kingdom of Granada, Vélez-Málaga surrendered to King Ferdinand the Catholic on April 27, 1487, with the last Nasrid Mayor Abul Kasim Venegas and his first Christian mayor being Corregidor Diego Arias. According to the chroniclers of the time, King Ferdinand II of Aragon (Fernando el Católico) was about to die on the site of the city, a fact that has been reflected in the coat of arms of the city. The Nasrid inhabitants were expelled from the city, although they were allowed to carry their personal property. However, the villagers were able to stay in their homes, as the new authorities needed to maintain the Nasrid productive system, based on advanced highly productive agricultural techniques. Nevertheless, the Mudejar were frequently victims of rapine by the new lords, who worked hard to increase their lands, causing the Mudejares of Nerja and Torrox to be erected in 1488, which caused numerous losses to the Christians. Since Granada had not yet fallen, a third of the 600 repopulators, from Baja Andalucia, Extremadura, Murcia and Castile, were military personnel. These obtained three times the extension of land destined to the pawns. The rest of the lands were delivered to the Church and to the communal assets of the Council. Torre del Mar, on the other hand, was ceded to Ruiz López de Toledo, who rejected the offer and donated it, in turn, to the city of Vélez-Málaga, which also received the tahas of Bentomiz and Frigiliana and later Zalia. Like many other cities of the ancient Kingdom of Granada, Vélez-Málaga was endowed with certain privileges. In the fiscal area, it was exempt from alcabalas to basic food, clothing and housing.

Modern Age

The new Christian authorities brought with them a new concept of city and shortly after the conquest there were substantial changes in their urban morphology. Public squares and new civil and religious buildings were ordered, which led to important spatial transformations. The churches of Santa María, San Juan, San Roque and San Juan Evangelista, the convent of San Francisco and the hermitages of San Sebastián, San Cristóbal and Santa Catalina were built on the old mosques. In the second half of the sixteenth century there was a great urban development with the construction of monasteries such as Nuestra Señora de Gracia and San José de la Soledad, giving rise to the so-called convent town. As for the civil buildings, the hospitals of Los Lazarinos and San Marcos are developed.

The Battle of Málaga (1704), as painted by Isaac Sailmaker, was the largest naval battle of the War of Spanish Succession. It took place off the coast of Vélez-Málaga on August 24, 1704. Vélez-Málaga was constituted in the neuralgic center of the zone, that still today maintains like capital of the Axarquía. In Torre del Mar most of the vine and citrus cultivations of the region were concentrated and from there they were sold and exported to northern Europe. Other lands were dedicated to the cultivation of cereals, vegetables and sugar cane. During the seventeenth century there was a decline in population, due to the epidemics and wars that affected Spain at the time. The incursions of the Turkish and Berber pirates were constant in this century. The watchtowers on the coast gave alarm to the detachment based in Vélez, which temporarily housed the Captaincy General de la Costa. The municipal Cabildo was monopolized by the oligarchy and even the regiments became private property. From 1640 it had its own corregimiento. Vélez-Málaga supported the Bourbons during the War of Spanish Succession, and witnessed on 23 August 1704 the naval confrontation known as the Battle of Vélez-Málaga, in which a Spanish-French fleet faced an Anglo-Dutch fleet . Between them, 146 boats were put and more than 46,000 men in combat, of which they died more than 4,500, without that neither part was clearly seen as victorious. The 18th century was a time of growth in which many churches and public buildings are built or restored. It also improved the insfraestuctura of the city and the ideas of the Enlightenment were announced with the creation in 1783 of the Economic Society of Friends of the Country.

Contemporary Age

Steam engine of the old sugar factory of Torre del Mar. Managed by the Larios family, the factory employed more than 300 workers. The 19th century began with an epidemic of yellow fever, which killed more than 60 percent of the population in 1804 and because of which, the military assumed the municipal government. The Napoleonic invasion divided the population into two factions that would oppose each other for most of the rest of the century. Subsequently, several cholera epidemics followed (see: Pandemic of cholera in Spain), and periods of drought. In the second half of the century there was a brief economic resurgence, but the phylloxera plague ruined the vineyards. In addition, the earthquake of 1884 devastated the area, which would only begin to recover economically with the expansion of sugar cane cultivation. In spite of the calamities that occurred in this century, the city undergoes a great urban growth, expanding by the areas of Cruz Verde, the walks of Andalusia and Reñidero, El Cerro and the Cross of the Lamb. In the year 1842, Torre del Mar obtains its own town hall, which had already been claimed previously. But its municipal term was too small and the port was under the jurisdiction of Vélez, reason why six years later, in 1848, it is reincorporated to the mother township, according to records in the cabildo.

At the time of the 1884 Andalusian earthquake the town had about 24,000 inhabitants. 1,291 houses collapsed completely, 500 became uninhabitable and the rest were damaged. There were 6 dead and 16 to 30 injured. The lower part of town, built on clays and sands, suffered more damage than the upper part, on shales. At the beginning of the 20th century, the railroad arrived at Torre del Mar and later at Vélez-Málaga, both of which were communicated to the provincial capital through the Suburban Railways of Malaga. With the outbreak of the Spanish Civil War and the establishment of the subsequent Spanish State, there were great calamities in the municipality, especially during the massive evacuation of the civilian population of Málaga in the direction of Almeria, in the so-called massacre of the Málaga-Almería highway. From the 1960s onwards, the municipality joined the tourist boom, which radically transformed the town of Torre del Mar with the construction of large apartment blocks.

Starting from 1960s, Vélez-Málaga experienced a boom in tourism.

=== Monuments & Places of Interest ===
Historical Center

The historical center of Vélez-Málaga is declared historical-artistic ensemble. It is composed of two facing hills: the Velez Malaga Fortress, where the remains of the tower of the Homage and the Church of Santa María la Mayor stand out, and the Cerro de San Cristóbal, crowned by the Ermita de los Remedios, from where A small architecture is scattered, of cubic forms in white tones that adapt to the land, conformed by the districts of "La Villa" and the "Arrabal de San Sebastián". Extramuros, in what corresponds to the development from the sixteenth century, presents a Mudejar and baroque architecture, with palaces and characteristic residential examples, as well as a series of churches and convents around which the urban fabric was conformed, Giving rise to picturesque streets and with singular urban perspectives on the own monuments that configure it.

=== Religious Architecture ===
The Church of Santa María la Mayor, Gothic-Mudejar style, was built on the old Arab mosque, as shown by the minaret turned into a bell tower. At present it is the headquarters of the Museum of the Holy Week of the city. The other great church of Vélez is the Church of San Juan Bautista, that occupied another one of the existing mosques. It was built in 1487, although it was modified in the 19th century. The sacristy is due to Martín de Aldehuela. The tower and the roofs are Mudejar while the cover is in the neoclassical. The Church of San Francisco, also occupies the site of a mosque and is Mudejar-Renaissance style. It was founded by the Catholic Monarchs and built between the sixteenth and seventeenth centuries. Originally it was part of the Real Convent of Santiago, disappeared on the occasion of the confiscation of 1836 and of which only the church has remained. The Convent of the Claras (seventeenth century), of late Baroque style and rococo ornamentation, are notable; The Convent of the Carmelites (1699), of baroque style and manierista cover; The disappeared Convent of the Carmen, of which only the church is conserved converted into municipal theater; And the hermitages of San Cristóbal or the Remedios (17th century), that of Nuestra Señora de la Cabeza, located next to the cemetery, and that of San Sebastián (1487), which is in ruins. It is also noteworthy in the new area of expansion of the city, popularly known as the Barrio, the Church of San José that was built in 2007 and which came to replace a small chapel that was erected canonically in 1971 in Linares street . It is worth mentioning the votive crosses of the city, initially four, but only two are preserved: the Cross of the Lamb and the Cross of San Sebastián, built after the Castilian conquest in each of the gates of the city. Another notable building is the Camarín de la Virgen de la Piedad, from the 17th century, located on Las Tiendas street. These signs of devotion were typical of the city. Another is conserved in the Royal Gate of the Villa, in honor to the Virgin of the Desamparados, named for being the place where during the French invasion occurred several executions of sailors. Also, a small mihrab of Arab origin is preserved in a private house in the neighborhood of La Gloria, as well as remains of some ancient Arab baths in the same area. One of the few stupas of Spain is in the nucleus of Triana: the Kalachakra Stupa. It is a contemporary construction of 13 m of height, but of a type of stupa unusual. It belongs to the Karma Guen center, dedicated to the great lamas of the Kagyu lineage in Europe. Finally, it is worth mentioning the hermit complex of Almayate, a settlement of a religious community where there are several cave dwellings excavated in the rock of which was an old Mozarabic church of the 8th and 9th centuries, as well as other works in stone. It is estimated that the settlement began as a result of the first pagan persecutions in Andalusia.

=== Civil Architecture ===
Beniel Palace

Villa Mercedes, is the last regional dwelling that is conserved in the Walk Larios of Torre del Mar. Palace of Beniel: built between 1610 and 1616, it is one of the best examples of 17th century civil architecture in the city. Its design is due to Miguel Delgado, master of the Cathedral of Malaga. At present, the building is the headquarters of the María Zambrano Foundation and the International University of La Axarquía. Casa Larios: current headquarters of the Mayor's Office of Torre de Mar. These are the offices and housing of the engineer of the sugar factory. It was built in 1888. Casa Cervantes: so called because Miguel de Cervantes stayed in it when he visited the city, although this fact is not confirmed. The façade has large balconies of forge and the cover, Gothic elements. It emphasizes its interior patio with gallery of semicircular arches and columns of brick. Former Hospital of San Juan de Dios: it was used until recently as a residence for the elderly once it stopped having sanitary use. It was built in 1680. Villa Mercedes: it is a stately house of late nineteenth century, of regionalist and Neomudéjar style, located in the Paseo Larios of Torre del Mar. Antiguo Pósito: dates from the eighteenth century and consists of two floors, one for barn, and the bottom one for fish market. The facade is divided by semicolumnas adosadas, and it contains a balcony in the center flanked by medallions. Nautical Club of Torre del Mar: building of the modern movement inscribed Well of Cultural Interest in 2006. It was designed by the architect Francisco Estrada Romero in 1967. The plant is organized from three circles. On the façade to the sea, the curved shapes and the white of their terraces dominate. In contrast the facade that gives to earth is much more closed and incorporates the dark color of the brick seen. Sources: two stand out: the fountain of Fernando VI, of white marble and Renaissance style, located in the place of the Constitution. It is named after being transferred during the reign of this king, although it dates back to the reign of Philip II, as shown in a shield of the source.37 The other is the fountain of the Plaza de las Glorias, dating to the century XVI and has a circular pond and a bulbous shaft. Old train station: is an example of the functional architecture of the early twentieth century, built with the arrival of the Suburban Railways of Malaga to the municipality. It responds to the regionalist and neomudéjar aesthetics of the taste of the time. Other smaller footings in different conservation status have also survived.

=== Military Architecture ===
- Fortress of Vélez-Málaga: also called castle, is crowning a hill that dominates all the old part of the population. Together with the so-called Puerta de Antequera, it was almost completely destroyed during the French invasion and its remains used as quarry. It has recovered the tower of the tribute and improved its surroundings. It has been used as a royal house, captain general, jail and town hall.
- Walls of Vélez Málaga: of the old walled set are conserved some sections and two of the four original doors: the Puerta Real and the Door of Antequera.
- Castle of Torre del Mar: only some sections of the wall are preserved in houses attached to the castle in the 19th and 20th centuries.
- Casa Fuerte del Marqués: also called Castillo del Marqués. It is located in Valle-Niza and was built in the 18th century with a defensive purpose. It is composed of a semicircular bastion attached to a hornabeque. The interior is distributed around a rectangular courtyard. Formerly it was surrounded by a moat. At present it houses a hotel school.
- Lookout towers: from what used to be the ancient defensive cord of the coast, several towers remain: the Torre Gorda in Benajarafe, the Tower of Chilches, the Tower of Lagos, the Right Tower of Mezquitilla and the towers Manganeta and Jaral, both in Almayate.

== Main sights ==
Notable sites include:

- Remains of the Moorish alcazar, popularly referred to as La Fortaleza, on the hill above the town
- Church of Santa María la Mayor (1487), in Gothic–Mudéjar style, built over a previous mosque (whose minaret is the current bell tower); the church is also home to the Museum of Semana Santa
- Church of St. Francis (15th-16th centuries)
- Church of Nuestra Señora de la Encarnación
- Iglesia de San Juan Bautista church
- Casa de Cervantes - a 16th-century palace in which Don Miguel de Cervantes once stayed
- Palacio del Marqués de Beniel (1610–1616). It was designed by Miguel Delgado, also architect of the Málaga Cathedral.
- CAC Vélez-Málaga - Museum of Contemporary Art
- MVVEL - Museo de Vélez-Málaga
- Convent of the Carmelites (1699), in Baroque style. It has a Renaissance portal.
- Remains of the walls, including the Royal Gate and the Antequera Gate
- Castle of the Marquis (18th century)
- Coastal watch towers.

== Transportation ==
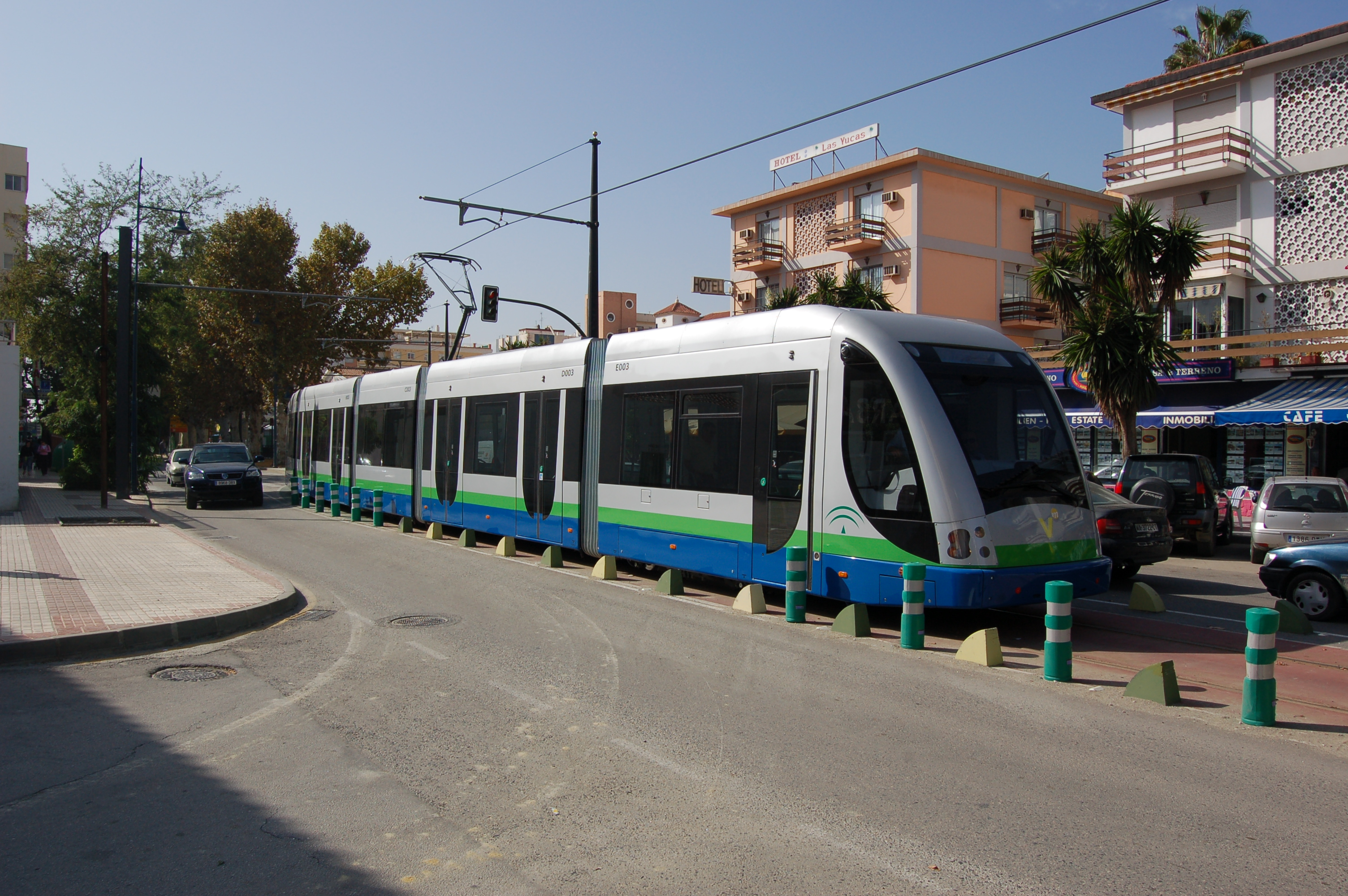
Tram Service (now ceased).

A railway was built from Vélez that reached the village of Ventas de Zafarraya in August 1922. It was meant to continue to Alhama de Granada, but got no further than Ventas. However, as road transport became more efficient the railway became unprofitable and was closed on 12 May 1960, A tram service used to run from Vélez to Torre del Mar, which has many shops and restaurants lacking in Vélez. However, due to funding problems the service ceased in April 2012. Along the tramline are the state-of-the-art Torre del Mar hospital and a major shopping mall, El Ingenio whose main store is Eroski.

The transportation infrastructure is currently being expanded to deal with the extensive growth. The bus terminal is also being expanded, with service through Torre, through María Zambrano all the way to the Málaga Airport. Buses and trains to the larger cities of Spain are also available from Vélez through the transportation infrastructure. Vélez-Málaga has an airport (Axarquía airport), and a fishing port. The Autovía del Mediterráneo crosses through the middle of its territory, with a junction to the carretera nacional (national highway) 340.

== Geography ==
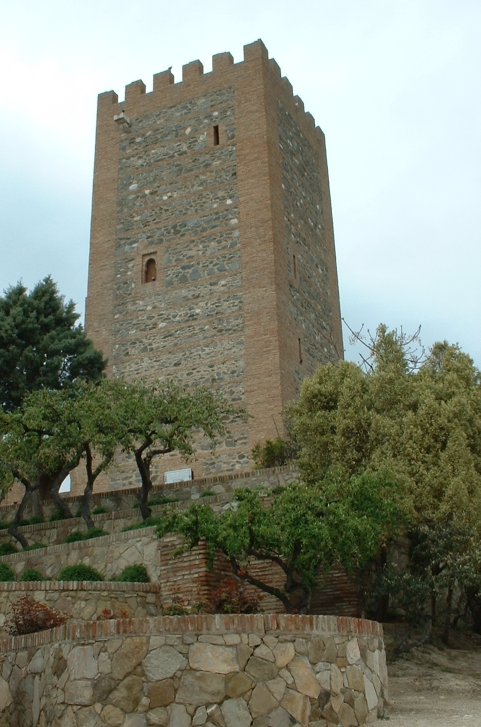
Tower of the ruined castle at Vélez-Málaga

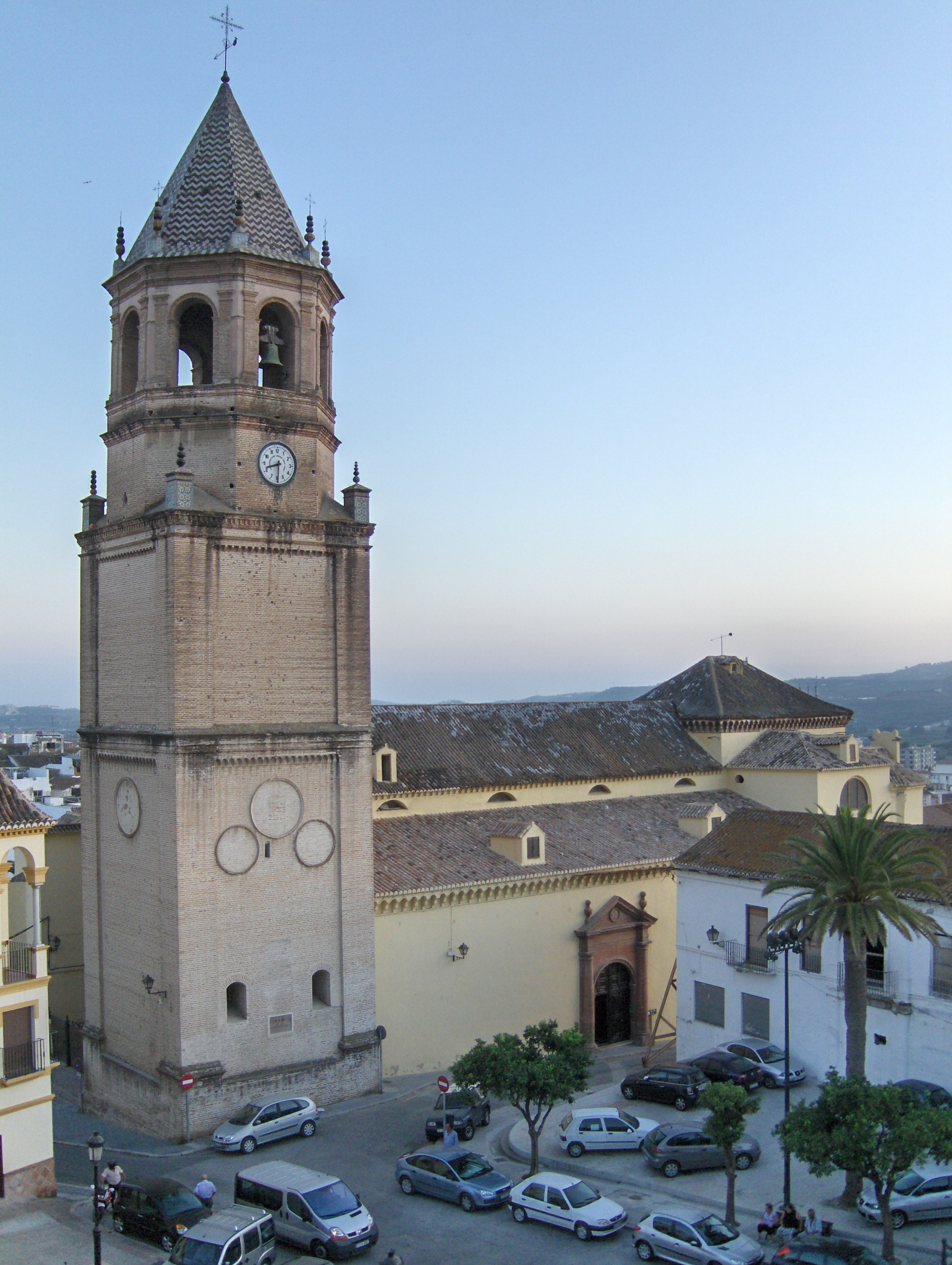
Church of St. John the Baptist.

The municipality's boundaries include some 25 km of coastline. The Vélez River is the significant watercourse.

=== Location and communication ===
Neighbouring municipalities are:

- to the north La Viñuela and Canillas de Aceituno
- to the northeast, Sedella and Arenas
- to the east, Algarrobo
- to the south, the Mediterranean
- to the west, Rincón de la Victoria and Macharaviaya, Benamocarra and Iznate
- to the northwest, Almáchar and Benamargosa.

The city also includes an exclave, Lagos, which is bordered to the north by Sayalonga, to the east by Torrox, to the south by the Mediterranean, and to the west by Algarrobo.

=== Districts ===
Almayate, Benajarafe, Cajiz, Caleta de Velez, Chilches, Lagos, Mezquitilla, Trapiche, Triana, Torre del Mar, Valle-Niza, Vélez Málaga.

=== Urban districts ===
Barrio del Pilar, La Villa, Pueblo Nuevo de la Axarquía "Carabanchel", La Gloria, Capuchinos, Barrio Barcelona, Carretera de Arenas, Camino de Algarrobo, Camino viejo de Málaga, San Francisco.

== Culture ==
The most important event of the year is the Royal San Miguel festival, held at the end of September and the beginning of October each year. Other festivals celebrated include the Veladilla el Carmen, Santiago (St James) and Santa Ana. Semana Santa or Holy Week is also one of the most important dates on the town's calendar. With 19 individual cofradias (brotherhoods) and processions involving ornate floats commemorating the crucifixion and resurrection of Jesus, it's one of the most notable in Andalusia.

Vélez-Málaga is one of the last places in Europe where public cockfighting is conducted.

The town has an active Flamenco music scene centred around its local peña (Peña Flamenca Niño de Vélez) and Flamenco Abierto, an organisation that puts on regular performances across the Axarquía region which has recently attracted the likes of El Pele, Diego Carrasco & Family and Jorge Pardo. Jorge Pardo play a music jazz.

== Demographics ==
Vélez is currently growing rapidly, with expatriates and immigrants from other parts of Spain appearing in every part of the municipality. Ethnic minority groups include Gypsies, a small Chinese community, Moroccans, sub-Saharan Africans, and expatriates from other European Union countries especially Germany, Ireland and the United Kingdom. In 2003 there were 2,743 residents who did not have Spanish nationality.

Since 1990 there has been a movement, with its own political party, to separate Torre del Mar from Vélez.

== Notable people from Vélez-Málaga ==
- María Zambrano, philosopher
- Joaquin Lobato, poet
- Fernando Hierro, footballer
- Juan Breva, Flamenco singer - considered to be the creator of the Malagueña style of flamenco
- Joaquin Lobato, poet
- Amparo Muñoz, Miss Spain 1973, Miss Universe 1974 and actress
- Rocío Molina, flamenco dancer

== See also ==
- List of municipalities in Málaga
- Geography of Spain
- List of cities in Spain
