= Algarrobo, Spain =

Algarrobo
- Municipality and town
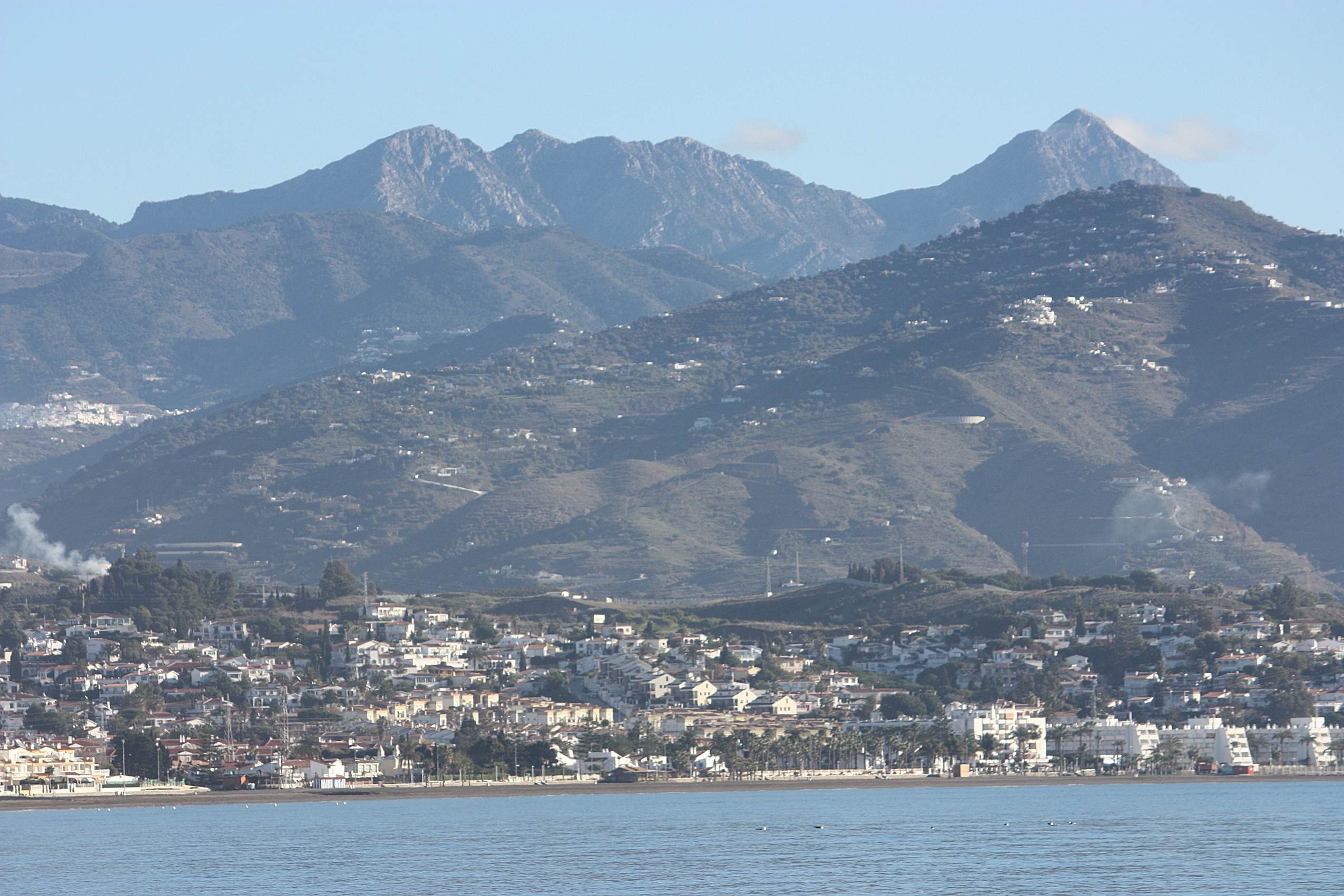

- Flag Coat of arms

- Municipal location in Málaga Province

- Location in Spain
- Coordinates: 36°46′N 4°02′W
- Country: Spain
- Autonomous community: Andalucía
- Province: Málaga Province
- Comarca: Axarquía - Costa del Sol

Area
  - Total: 3.9 sq mi (10 km^{2})
- Elevation: 282 ft (86 m)

Population (2025-01-01)
  - Total: 7,103
- Time zone: UTC+1 (CET)
  - Summer (DST): UTC+2 (CEST)
- Website: http://www.algarrobo.es

Algarrobo is a town and municipality in the province of Málaga, part of the autonomous community of Andalusia in southern Spain. The municipality is situated in the coastal area of La Axarquía, 32 kilometers from the city of Málaga. It is bordered on the north by the municipality of Arenas and Sayalonga, to the east and west by Vélez-Málaga and to the south by the Mediterranean Sea. It is situated at an altitude of 86 meters. The main center for the population is Algarrobo, a town of Arab architecture situated 3.5 kilometers from the coast. Other towns in the municipality are Algarrobo Costa, Mezquitilla and Trayamar.

It has a population of approximately 5,000 residents. Natives of the town are called Algarrobeños. Its surface area is 9.73 km^{2} and has a density of 639.16 inhabitants/km^{2}.

== History ==
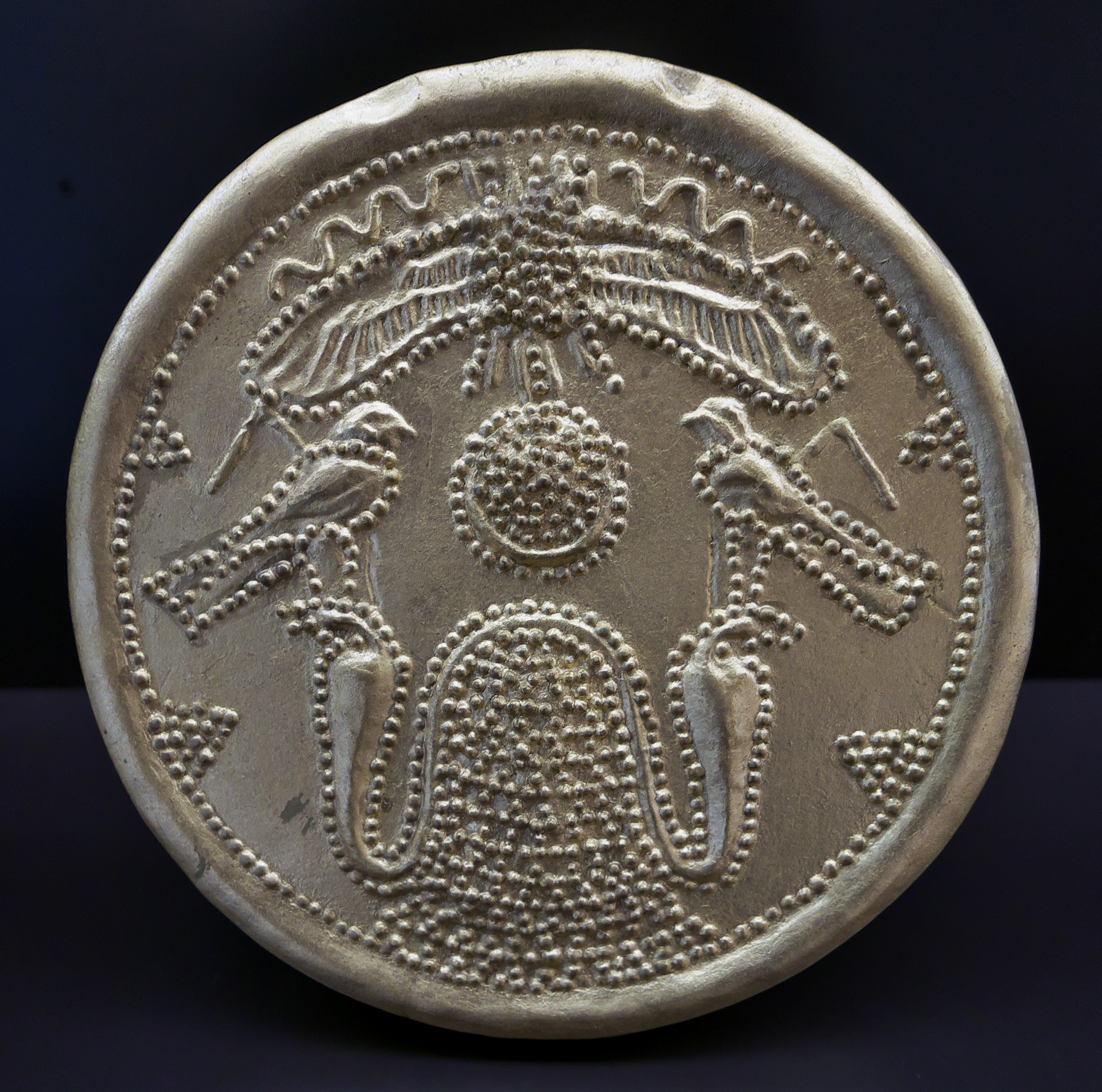
A Phoenician medal with Egyptian motives found in Trayamar

Its origins likely date back to the Paleolithic period, although the first documented prehistoric settlement is from the Copper Age. The Phoenician necropolis Trayamar and the remains found in the Morro de Mezquitilla have been catalogued by German professors Schubart and Niemeyer as one of the most important Phoenician remains that still exists in the West.

The entry of the Arabs in the Iberian Peninsula entailed a resurgence when Berbers from Algiers founded the town of Algarrobo more to the interior and introduced crops such as almonds and raisins and small industries of silk.

== Monuments ==
- Church of Santa Ana. From the 17th century.
- Ermita de San Sebastian. Dating back to the 17th or 18th century. In 1976 it had to be rebuilt to its previous image due to the landslide hazard it presented.
- Ermita de las Angustias, located at the exit of Algarrobo Norte. Despite not being an architectural gem, it is dear to the city. All the brides of the town bring their flowers here.

== Politics and administration ==
The political administration of the municipality is carried out through a democratically controlled town council whose members are elected every four years by universal suffrage. The electoral census is composed of all residents registered in Algarrobo over 18 and Spanish nationals and other member states of the European Union. According to the Law on the General Election, which sets the number of eligible councillors depending on the population of the municipality, the Municipal Corporation of Algarrobo is composed of 13 councillors.

== Famous persons ==
- Enrique Ramos Ramos

== See also ==
- List of municipalities in Málaga
