= Moclinejo =

Town and municipality in the province of Málaga, Andalusia, Spain

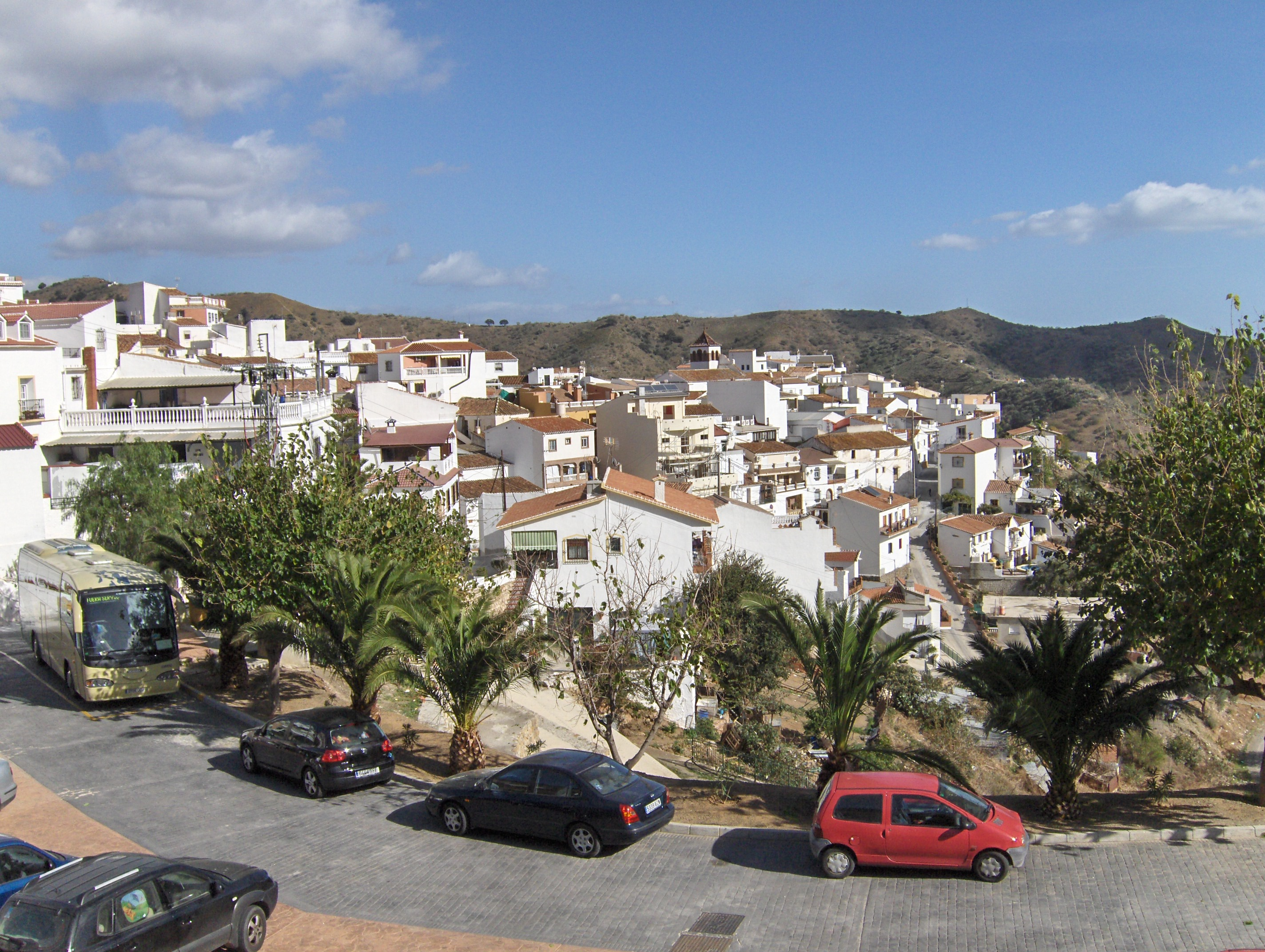
- Moclinejo Municipal, Malaga, Spain

- Flag Coat of arms

- Location in Spain.
- Coordinates: 36°46′N 4°15′W
- Sovereign state: Spain
- Autonomous community: Andalusia
- Province: Málaga

Area
  - Total: 15 km^{2} (5.8 sq mi)
- Elevation: 447 m (1,467 ft)

Population (2025-01-01)
  - Total: 1,222
  - Density: 81/km^{2} (210/sq mi)
- Time zone: UTC+1 (CET)
  - Summer (DST): UTC+2 (CEST)
- Website: www.moclinejo.es

Moclinejo is a town and municipality in the province of Málaga, part of the autonomous community of Andalusia in southern Spain. It belongs to the comarca of La Axarquía. The municipality is situated approximately 27 kilometres from Málaga and 558 km from Madrid. It has a population of approximately 1200 residents. The natives are called Moclinejenses or Conejos as a nickname.

== See also ==
- List of municipalities in Málaga
