= Arenas, Málaga =

Arenas
- Municipality
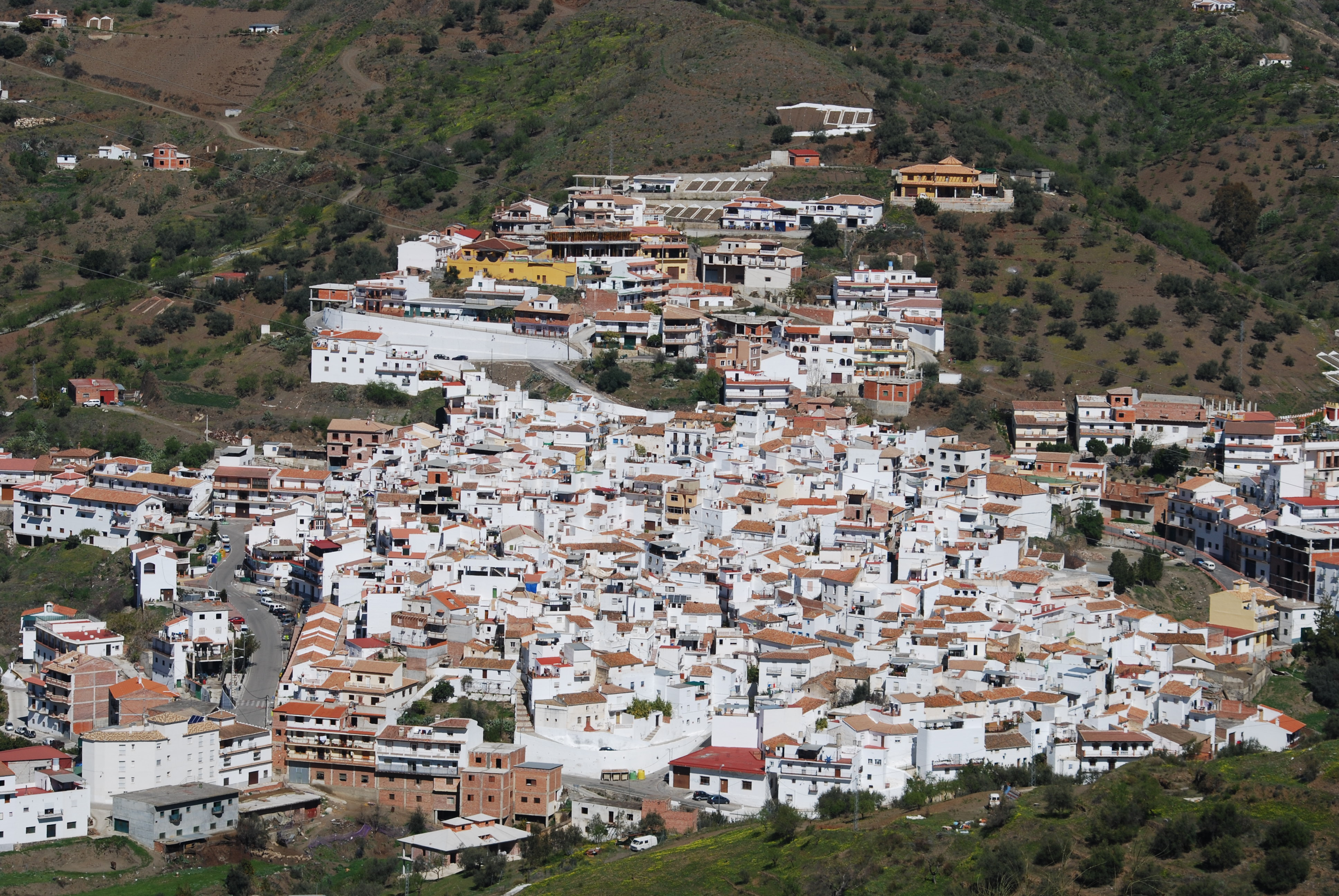
- Arenas

- Flag Coat of arms

- Municipal location in the Province of Málaga

- Location in Spain Arenas (Andalusia) Arenas (Spain)
- Coordinates: 36°48′57″N 4°02′41″W
- Sovereign state: Spain
- Autonomous community: Andalusia
- Province: Málaga
- Comarca: La Axarquía

Area
  - Total: 26.3 km^{2} (10.2 sq mi)
- Elevation: 500 m (1,600 ft)

Population (2025-01-01)
  - Total: 1,291
  - Density: 49.1/km^{2} (127/sq mi)
- Demonym: Arenuscos
- Time zone: UTC+1 (CET)
  - Summer (DST): UTC+2 (CEST)
- Postal code: 29717

Arenas is a municipality in the province of Málaga located in the autonomous community of Andalusia in southern Spain. It is situated in the comarca of Axarquía. By way of road it is located 12 kilometers from Vélez-Málaga, 50 km from Málaga and 577 km from Madrid. It is located northwest of the Axarquia, between the sierras of Tejeda and Almijara and the Castle of Bentomiz.

Arenas enjoys a lush natural setting, where the streams, oak and pomegranate provide plenty of water resulting in a rich vegetation. It is a Moorish village where grapevine and olive were the main crops and still are an important element in the landscape and its economy, producing sweet, dry or semi-dry wine.

The municipality is bordered to the south by Algarrobo, to the east by Sayalonga, to the north by Canillas de Albaida, Salares, Sedella and Canillas de Aceituno, in the extreme northwest corner with La Viñuela and to the west by Vélez-Málaga. This is a town very close to the Costa del Sol and the Mediterranean beaches typical of Andalusia and forms a rural and residential tourism that is beginning to develop.

== Geography ==
In 2008 Areans had a population of 1,421 inhabitants and in 2000 it had 1,191 inhabitants (INE data). In recent years the population has begun to have a slight growth due to the arrival of people from other countries. Both British and Central European residential tourism in Arenas is for the mild Mediterranean climate. There are also some Moroccan or Romanian immigrants working in agriculture and construction.

Arenas's urban landscape is typically Andalusian with narrow streets, steep and with whitewashed buildings. It is surrounded by mountains very close to the Mediterranean Sea. Mount Bentomiz has an altitude of 711 m in altitude, steep slopes and with views over the coast and the region of Axarquia. Other mountains are Cerro Beas and Cerro Alto. Arenas shares with Canillas de Aceituno, Sedella, and Salares a large area in the Sierras of Tejeda, Almijara and Alhama Natural Park. Several trails, gorges, and streams allow for hiking and climbing.

Rain-fed crops such as olive trees, almond trees and vines predominate the landscape, producing typical products such as raisins and muscatel wine. In addition, tropical fruit trees, such as avocado and mango trees, have been introduced in the abundant irrigation areas.

Río Seco is the river crossing this municipality, that leads into Torre del Mar y Caleta de Vélez. Another river, called el Rubite a tributary of Vélez, runs north of Arena.

Daimalos and Los Vados, are both boroughs found within its municipality limits. The borough of Daimalos is near Arenas, about two kilometers away, and its origins can be traced to the Muslim period. The borough of Los Vados can be found in an old road that links Vélez-Málaga with La Viñuela and its urban center is more spread out.

== Wildlife and vegetation ==
Vegetation: mediterranean scrub, carrasco pine and an abundance of rosemary, matagallos or Phlomis purpurea, junipers and gorse. In higher grounds, close to Sierras de Tejeda and Almijara we can appreciate diverse specimens such as a conifer called Taxus baccata, maple trees, and Crataegus monogyna Jacq.

Wildlife: Mountain bird are common, among them, we can mention the common vultures, goshawks, eagles and peregrine falcons. The wildcats and ibex are also common mammals.

== History ==
Arenas was founded during medieval times, that is, during Al-Ándalus era. During the Nazarí Kingdom Granada, Arenas was a farmstead that belong to the Bentomiz district, fortress that currently is within limits of Arena's municipality. This district was known for its wealth of agricultural products such as silk and raisins.

In April 1487, the Christian reconquest conquered back Axarquía's region, including Bentomiz Castle and nearby villages, including Arenas, Daimalos and Çuheyla, old vicinity near Bentomiz that was deserted after its conquest.

In the 16th century, the area the Moorish population revolted. After their defeat, the Moorish population of Arenas was expelled almost to its entirety and moved towards Segura de León, in Badajoz. Arenas, consequently was repopulated with families coming from other parts of the peninsula, mainly from two Jaen villages, Santiago de Calatrava y La Higuera de Calatrava. All the details regarding the repopulation Arenas, can be found in "Libro de Apeo y Repartimiento de Arenas," which can be found in the Real Cancillería de Granada archive. Arena's town hall has a copy of "Libro de Apeo y Repartimiento de Arenas."

From that moment forward, a Christian culture was developed. Most inhabitants work mainly in agriculture, which is the main source of work to this day.

== Monuments ==
Santa Catalina Mártir Parish is in downtown Arenas. This parish was built following the mudéjar style, and it's near the old minaret from the moorish era. Inside the parish, there are some interesting sculptures, such as Virgen del Rosario, an anonymous sculpture from the 18th century and the carvings that can be seen during the Easter processions. An Evaristo Guerra mural can be seen in the church's baptistery.

Another interesting mudéjar church, called Iglesia de la Concepción, and minaret can be found in Dailamos.

The ruins of the Bentomiz fortress, can be seen on top of a hill overlooking Arenas. This fortress was built during the Islamic era. Among some interesting remains some towers, some wall pieces and cisterns can be seen, although the remains are scarce in number, they are still quite interesting. The first written references about the Fortress of Bentomiz were written by the King Abd Allah Ibn Buluggin from Granada in his memoirs during the 11th century.

== Gastronomy ==
Among the traditional dishes are chivo al ajillo (Roasted goat with garlic), choto al ajillo (Roasted lamb with garlic), choto al vino (Roasted lamb with wine), cole and fennel stew cook with some wine.

== Gallery ==
Arenas

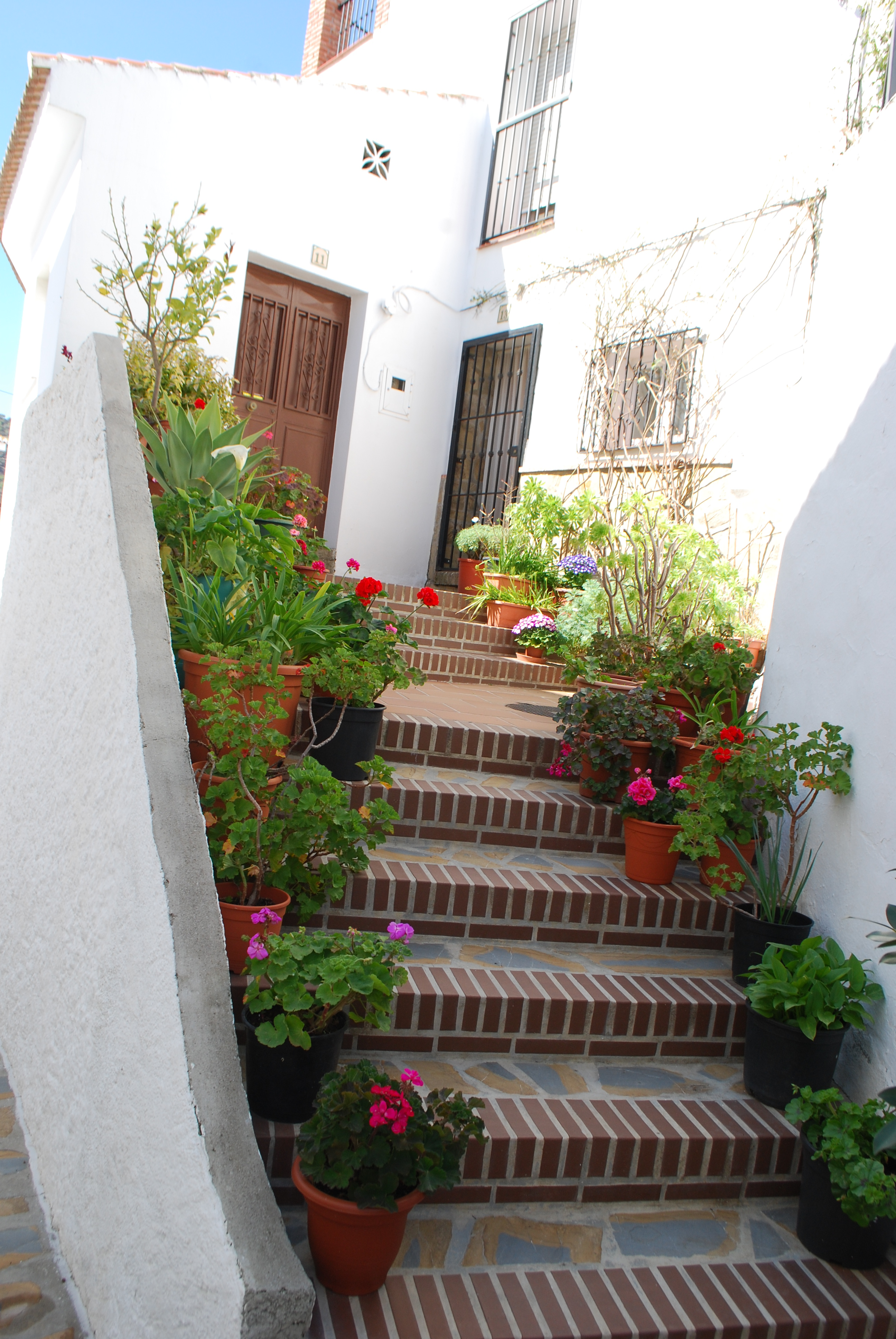
Arenas

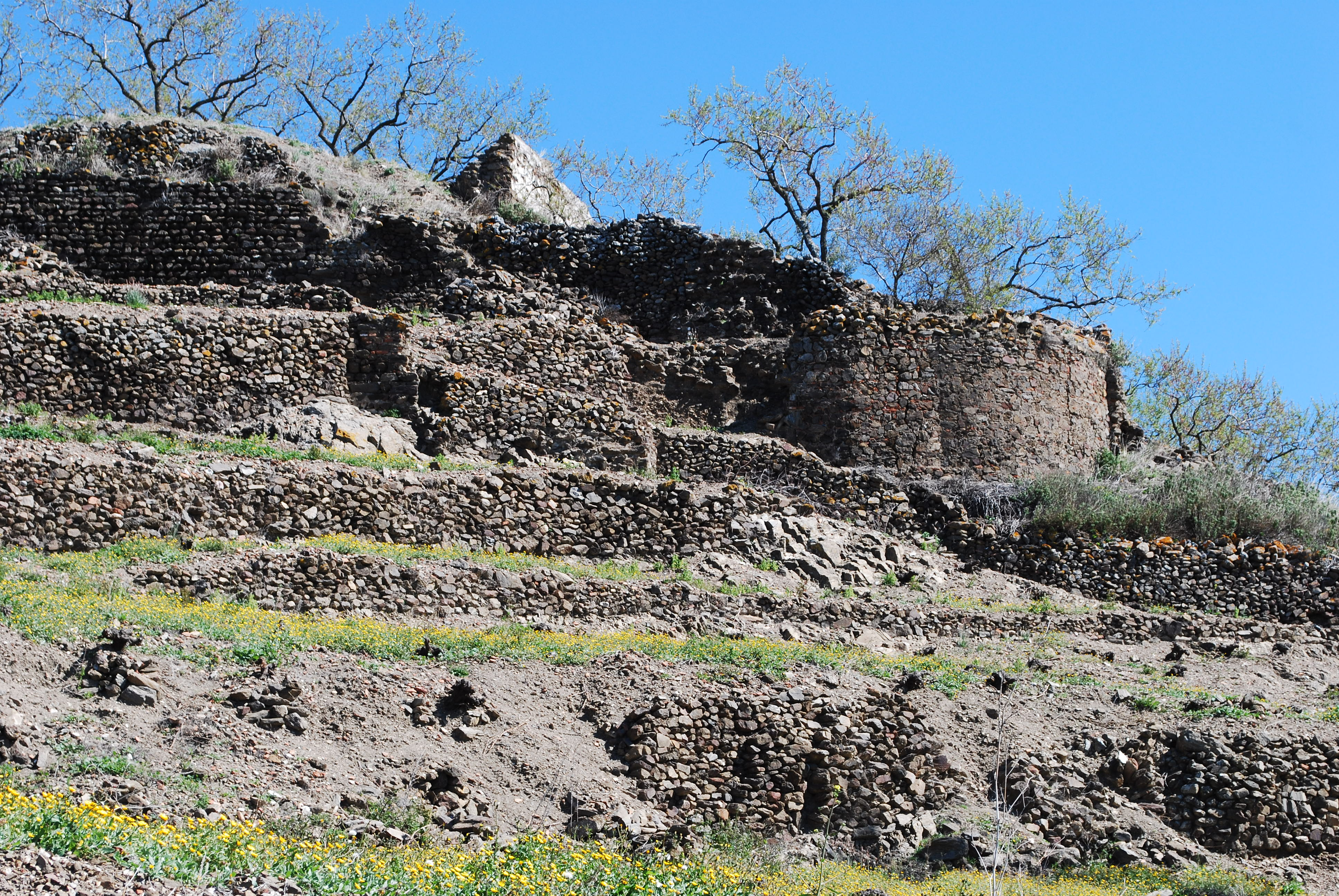
Castle Bentomiz

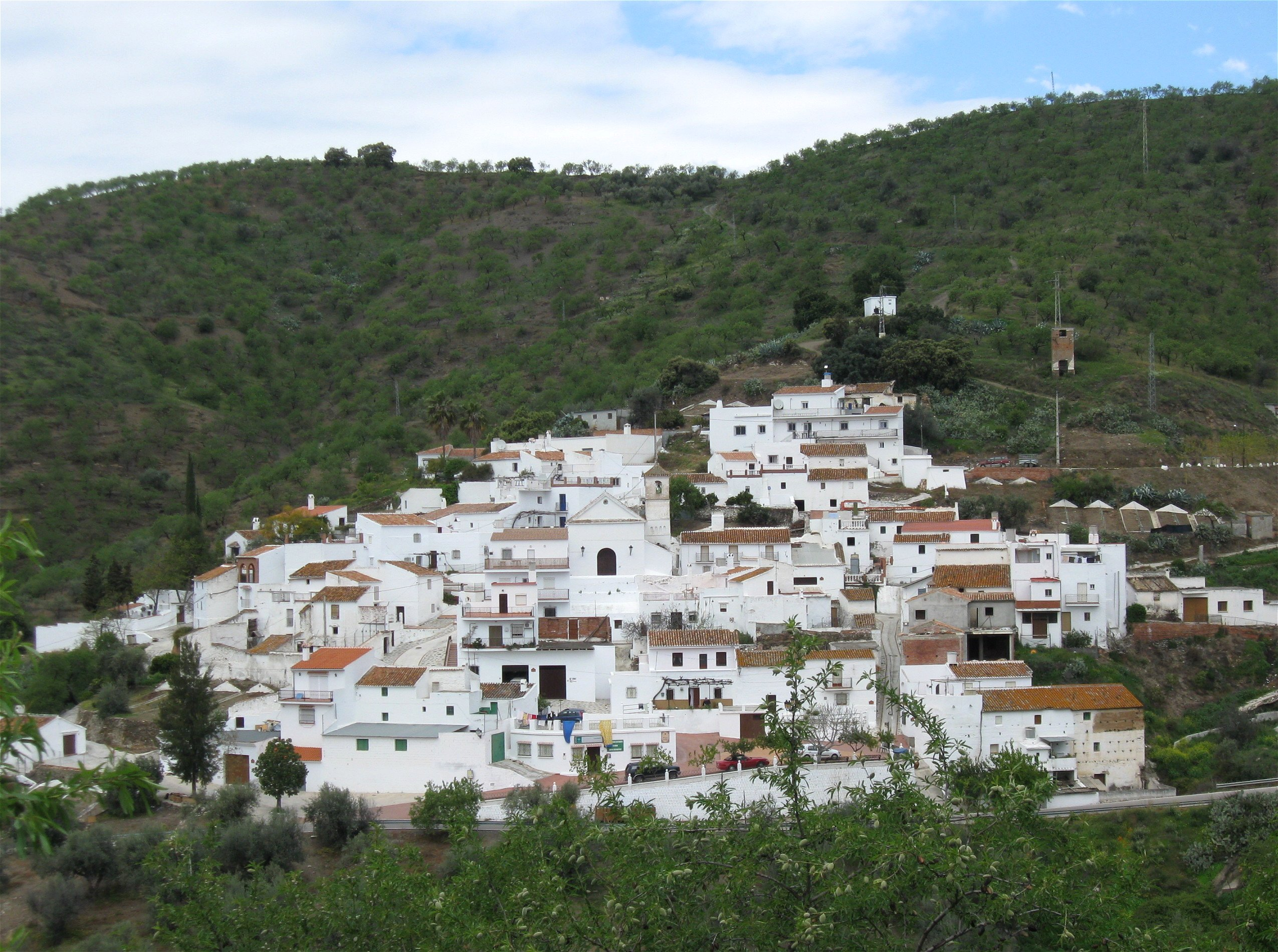
Daimalos

== See also ==
- List of municipalities in Málaga
