= Torre del Mar =

Locality on the southern coast of Spain

Coordinates: 36°45′N 4°05′W

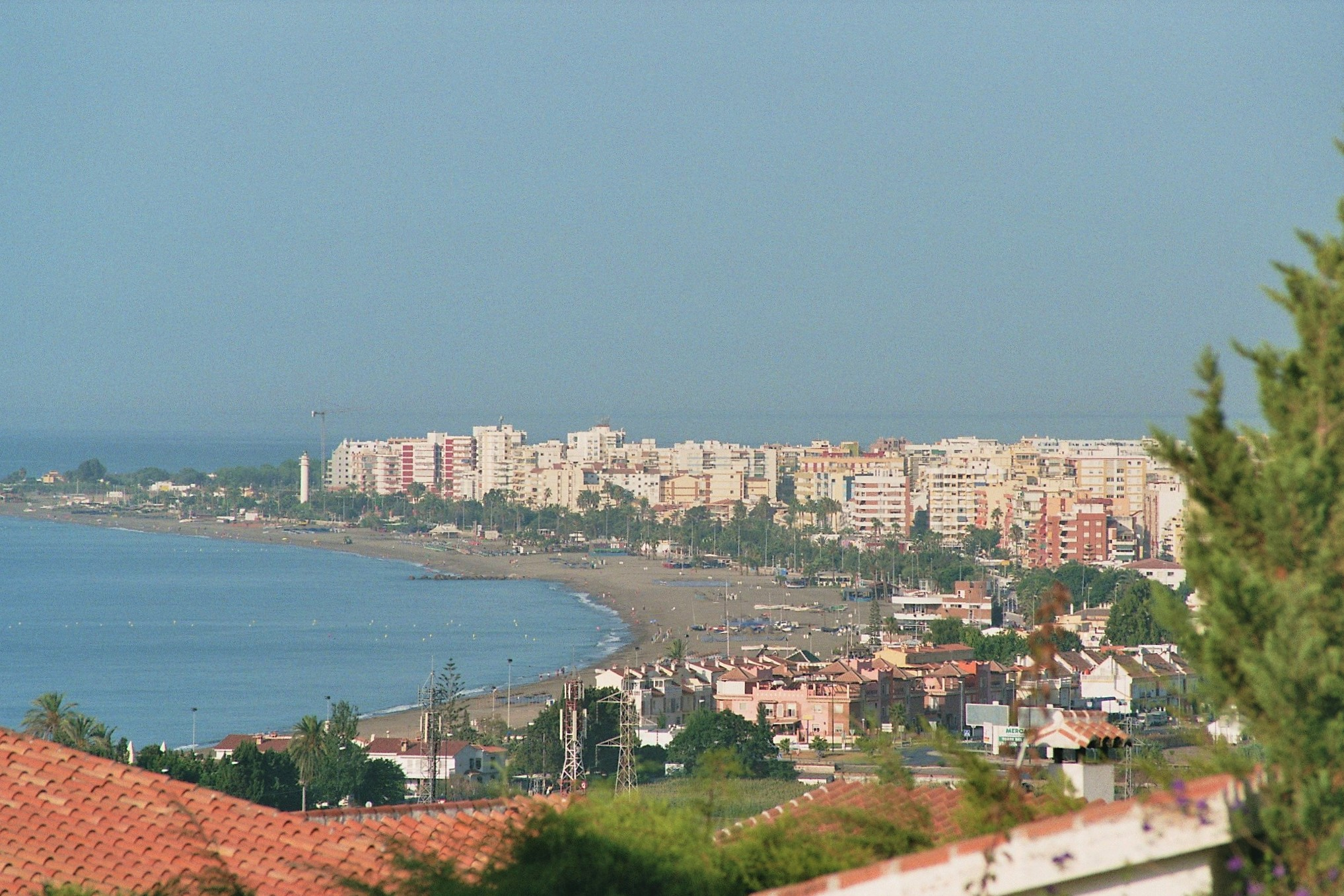

Torre del Mar is a locality on the southern coast of Spain, in the municipality of Vélez-Málaga, Axarquía, located in the province of Málaga.

It is a popular summer tourist resort for Spanish people.

== History ==
A large 6th- to 8th-century necropolis was uncovered in 1967 during agricultural excavation (which damaged part of it). Systematic excavation was begun in 1971 by the German Archaeological Institute.

There was also once a Punic-Roman city called Maenoba or Menoba (Cerro del Mar), at the mouth of the river Velez, which was a production and distribution centre for the famous Roman garum.

Despite this, Torre del Mar can be considered a relatively new settlement, founded at the start of the 16th century, a settlement protected by a small castle from the Nasrid dynasty, known as Alcozaiba Tower. This was renamed "Torre de la Mar" (tower of the sea) in 1487 when it was taken by the Catholic Monarchs. At this time it was ceded to Ruiz López de Toledo who refused the offering and donated it to the city of Velez-Málaga, this was later confirmed in the year 1571 when King Charles I confirmed the permanent concession of the castle to Velez-Málaga.

During the 16th and 17th centuries, a deep re-modelling of the Islamic defence site was undertaken. However, it wasn’t until 1730 that important reformation of the castle was undertaken to adapt it for artillery, with the aim of relieving, as much as possible, the effects of the attacks from the British naval fleet. It was in this latter century, in 1704, that the waters of this coast witnessed a bloody naval conflict (the Battle of Velez-Málaga) between Franco-Spanish and Anglo-Dutch fleets as part of the Spanish War of Succession. This battle was settled without a clear winner, despite the numerous casualties suffered on both sides.

Throughout the 18th century, a gradual urban development was started, with the building of houses in the areas surrounding the castle. These were grouped around the farmstead of the Casa de la Viña, where a small neighbourhood was built. As well as the building of new houses, in 1748, the hermitage of Our Lady of las Angustias was erected.

The basic pillars of the economy of Torre del Mar was agriculture, fishing, and trade, this last one was facilitated by the enormous inlet, although the lack of port structures greatly limited activity since the goods had to be transported by barge. Despite the great efforts made by the council of Velez in this area, these efforts were fruitless due to a lack of money and the determined opposition of the city of Malaga where they tried to favour the sale of their own products. What is true is that Torre del Mar became the port of the Axarquia region and the majority of its agricultural produce (wines, raisins, oil, almonds, dried figs, citrus fruit etc.) was exported to the major ports in the north of Europe.

The 19th century saw a decline in commercial growth due to the lack of necessary infrastructure, at the time of increased exploitation of sugar cane. The preindustrial activity in this area started in 1796, the year in which José García Navarrete asked for authorisation to build a sugar mill. Afterwards, Ramón de la Sagra, philosopher and business owner, propelled the creation of the Sociedad Azucarera Peninsular (Peninsular Sugar Society) in 1845, with the objective of starting the industrialisation of the sector, and in 1846 he built a modern sugar factory in the old mill of Torre del Mar. However, this has to be sold to the Larios family due to financing issues.

The Larios family ran the Factory Nuestra Señora del Carmen in Torre del Mar for 134 years, while holding great economic and political power throughout the whole county. From 1988, sugarcane production began to decrease drastically and in 1991 Torre del Mar had its last harvest.

In the mid-19th century, Torre del Mar had a council, although this was for a brief period of 4–6 years (1842-1848), this is recorded in Pascual Madoz’s "Geographical, Statistical, Historical Dictionary of Spain and its overseas possessions". In those times the region had 739 people living in 174 houses. There were many stores, a large place for salting products alongside a salt store, a primary school, a church dedicated to the calling of Saint Andrew the Apostle, a hermitage dedicated to Our Lady of Las Angustias (to which the entrance has recently been recovered), a cemetery as well as a number of wells and mills. In those days Mar, Emmedio and San Andrés streets already existed.

The Malaga-Almeria road was built around the year 1869; this determined the urban structure of Torre del Mar which was moved closer to the sea. In the first decade of the 20th century the railway station was built (the current bus station) and at the end of 1908 the train arrived for the first time, unfortunately this stopped running in 1968.

Between 1864 and 1889, Torre del Mar had a lighthouse at the mouth of the river Velez, but this was destroyed for a while. Later, in 1930 another lighthouse was built in what is now Toré Toré Avenue; this lighthouse has a range of 12 miles. It had to be closed due to the urban boom, and another was built right next to the beach, but this was only used for a very short time as in 1976 a new lighthouse was built, right next to the previous one and measuring 25 metres in height.

In the first years of the 20th century, we see the beginnings of what will be the new economic direction of Torre del Mar. It is at that time that some spas were opened with the intention, cautiously at first, of attracting some of the emerging tourists. However, it wasn’t until the second half of that century that this phenomenon, now a mass activity, altered the physiognomy completely by making the number of inhabitants and built-up areas grow. This has encouraged a very high tourist population which suffers strong oscillations depending on the season. Tourism also caused a change in customs and ways of thinking as contact with tourists meant the Spanish population began to share the nonconformist and liberal mentality of Europe at this time, causing the rupture of the out-of-date, traditionalist, Spanish culture.

== Places of special interest ==
=== Torre del Mar train station ===
This compact train station from 1904 has a rectangular body and a single hall with two floors and two side sections running along the sides of the main building. It has an eclectic decoration, using neo-mudejar style brickwork for the edges of the doors, openings and corners. It also has overhanging eaves and gabled roofs with green glass tiles. The lower, central section has two doors on each side of the lower floor and openings over each door. The side sections are only one story high and have similar entrances. The building served as the railway station for the suburban line from Malaga to Velez-Málaga.

=== Farmhouse Casa de la Viña (House of the Vineyard) ===
This hundred-year-old house stands at the foot of the mount Monte de la Viña in the original town centre of Torre del Mar, right next to the millenary channel of the fort house. The inhabitants abandoned this place to move to the vicinity of the old castle, which was out of service in the mid-19th century.

The building is built around a central, quadrangular patio, which is communicated with the rooms and stores, the latter being situated in the east and south of the building. There is a three-floored pavilion on the north façade with a four-sided sloped roof. On the west side is the long, main facade which has two heights with uniform spaces and barred windows.

=== Boat Club ===
The building was designed by Francisco Estrada Romero, influenced by the organic architecture of Frank Lloyd Wright. It is small-scale with two floors and two different areas: One social and one for boats. The floor is arranged around three circles of differing sizes and a number of rectangles. Of the many different elements the glass tower in the shape of an inverted cone stands out, its function was to control the races and auxiliary lights.

The building is an example of the modern movement from the second half of the 20th century, and manifests the unique uses of a maritime town such as Torre del Mar.

=== The Old Castle of Torre del Mar ===
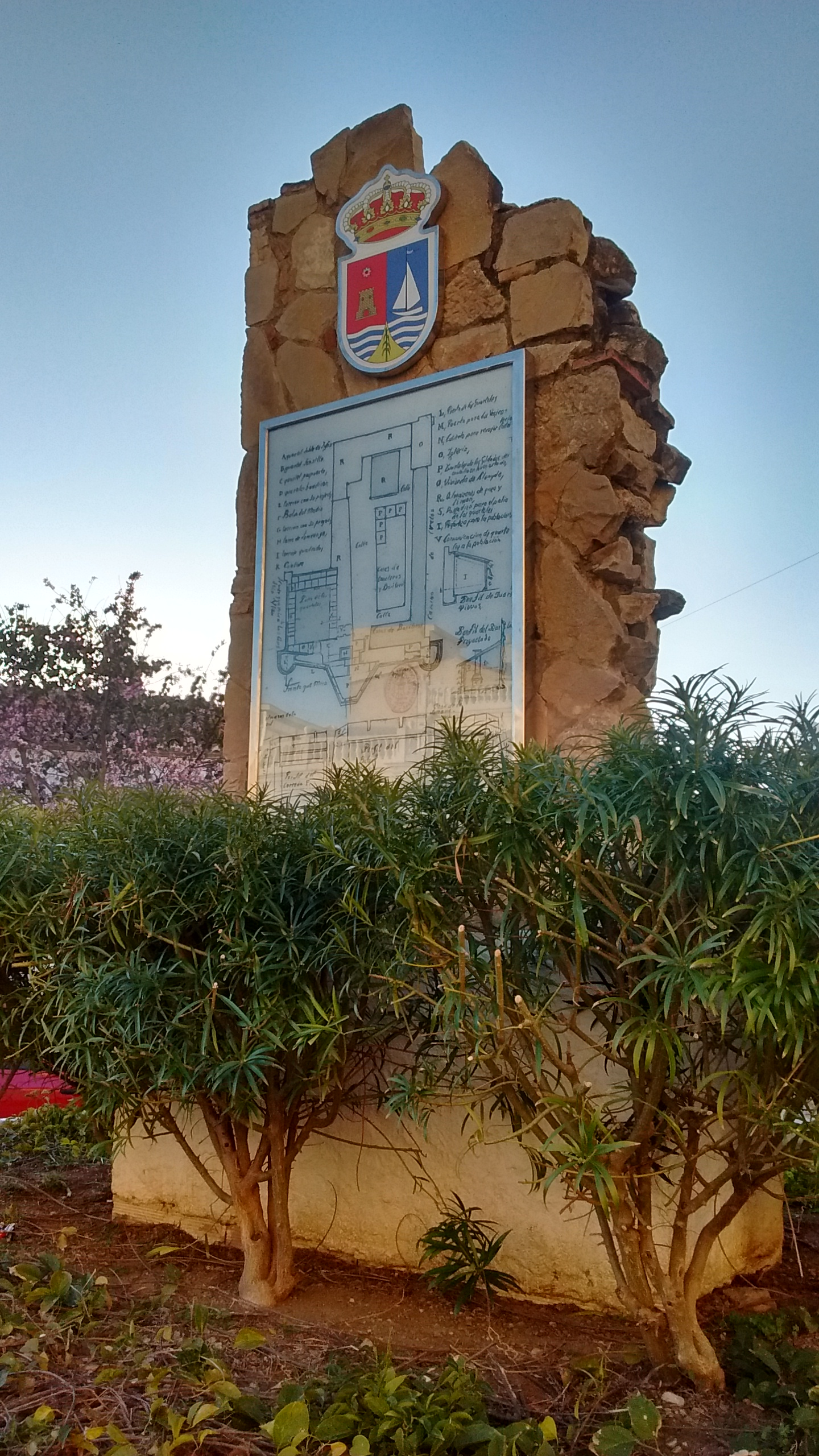
The Castillo de Torre del Mar

This is the castle-fort which is the original centre of what is now Torre del Mar. This coastal bastion was once small in size and its purpose was to watch the coast and protect the boats that docked in the natural port. Over time the fortification got further from the sea due to the progression of the ground. In 1730, an important reformation was carried out shaping it into what nowadays we know as the castle of Torre del Mar. In this reformation, they added a second front made up of two small curtains joined to the artillery battery which occupied the centre, and on the ends, two towers which already existed in the old space.

The castle also boasted the military building and stores, its second great function being the storage of agricultural products from all over the county, (such as raisins, wine and citrus fruit) ready for export. The castle of Torre del Mar is an emblematic icon forming part of the current history of the town.

=== Entrance to the Hermitage of Las Angustias ===
All that is left of the hermitage is the entrance, which was erected by Pedro González, founder of the brotherhood, in the early second half of the 18th century. It later disappeared at the end of the 19th century, and the space has been occupied by houses since then. The classic baroque entrance is made of stone slabs from Cerro del Peñón. The structure is marked by two pillars composed of the base, shaft and capital. While being restored, a bare-brick lintel was added as well as a small alcove. The hermitage occupied the full length of the houses that now stand and was entered from the side. The entrance is both an historical and artistic element, and is testimony to the old hermitage in this place.

=== Home of the Virgin of La Victoria ===
This home was constructed by the Larios family, possibly around the year 1907. This building was once called 'The building of Ave Maria' and was dedicated to charity. Later, in 1936, it was given over for use as schools and given the name 'Home of the Virgin of La Victoria'. The building is reminiscent of types of hospitals at the end of the 19th century and beginning of the 20th century. The main body is rectangular, where the door is found with steps leading to the main floor. It is made up of two floors and a semi-basement which lifts the building up. Behind the main body six parallel pavilions extend, joined together and to the main body by a corridor, with the centre free for a patio with vegetation, at the end of which is a small chapel. The whole place has large windows and large dimensions bringing light to the rooms. The building forms part of the contemporary history of Torre del Mar, and as such, the collective memory of the inhabitants.

=== House of Larios, Torre del Mar ===
The house of Larios dates from 1888 and also forms part of the sugar factory complex. It was used to house the offices of the personnel and the Factory engineer’s house. In the 70’s and 80’s, the building was used by the sugar cooperative. This building is simple and functional, in a regional style with mudejar influences, it is characteristic of the end of the 19th century, and is very similar to the factory building. The building has two floors with two pavilions joined by a transverse nave. In these pavilions you can observe the overhangs with wooden, neo-mudejar footings and glazed tiles. Of particular note is its great height and large bays which were decorated with bare brick in the same style as the corners of the building which nowadays are covered but can be seen from outside. There is a small entrance porch with two iron poles and decoration, on either side is a set of tiles from Seville dating from the nineteenth century. These tiles make up the image of the Immaculate Conception, in the style of a small altar which comes from one of the villas of Paseo Larios street, which has since been knocked down.

=== Villa Mercedes ===
Located in Paseo Larios street, this is the only regionalist house in this area from the end of the 19th century and beginning of the 20th century. Previously this street boasted a number of this kind of house, each enclosed by walls. This building has two floors and an attic in the regionalist, neo-mudejar style. It is made up of different sections with a tower rising on the left side, in the style of the 16th century towers. At the front there is a porch with two Tuscan columns with sculpted cyma, it also has a particularly interesting stucco border with a relief showing motifs of plants. The façade is decorated by the main balcony and windows with decorative forged iron barring. The tower is three storeys tall with twin bay windows. The roofs are edged with beams or corbels. This is an excellent example of a second home of a landowner from the industrial era towards the end of the 19th century and the beginning of the 20th century.

=== Lighthouse on the promenade ===
The lighthouse was built around the 1950s due to the distancing of the coast from the previous lighthouse. The building is industrial in style and has a square base supporting a rectangular prism with a number of windows opening to the outside of the lighthouse. It is topped by an entablature or moulding where the catadioptric system was kept. The lighthouse was built with polygonal stone slabs and the corners and windows were also edged with stone blocks. The inside is organised with an axis with a spiral staircase to go up to the top. Next to the tower is a small building which was used to house the electrical generator. This was a single-story rectangular building with a wooden, gabled roof and an inset window on one side. The corners and windows are edged with bare brick. It represents the fishing activity of a place which is closely linked to the sea.

=== Toré Tore Avenue Lighthouse ===
This was built in 1930, as you can see on the weather vane. The building is industrial in style and has a square base supporting a rectangular prism with a number of windows opening to the outside of the lighthouse, currently the lower windows are covered. It is topped by an entablature or moulding where the catadioptric system is kept. The lighthouse was built with polygonal stone slabs and the corners and windows were also edged with stone blocks. The inside is organised with an axis with a spiral staircase to go up to the top. Next to the tower is a small building which was used to house the electrical generator. This was a single-story rectangular building with a wooden, gabled roof and an inset window on one side. The corners and windows are edged with bare brick.

=== Sugar refinery ===
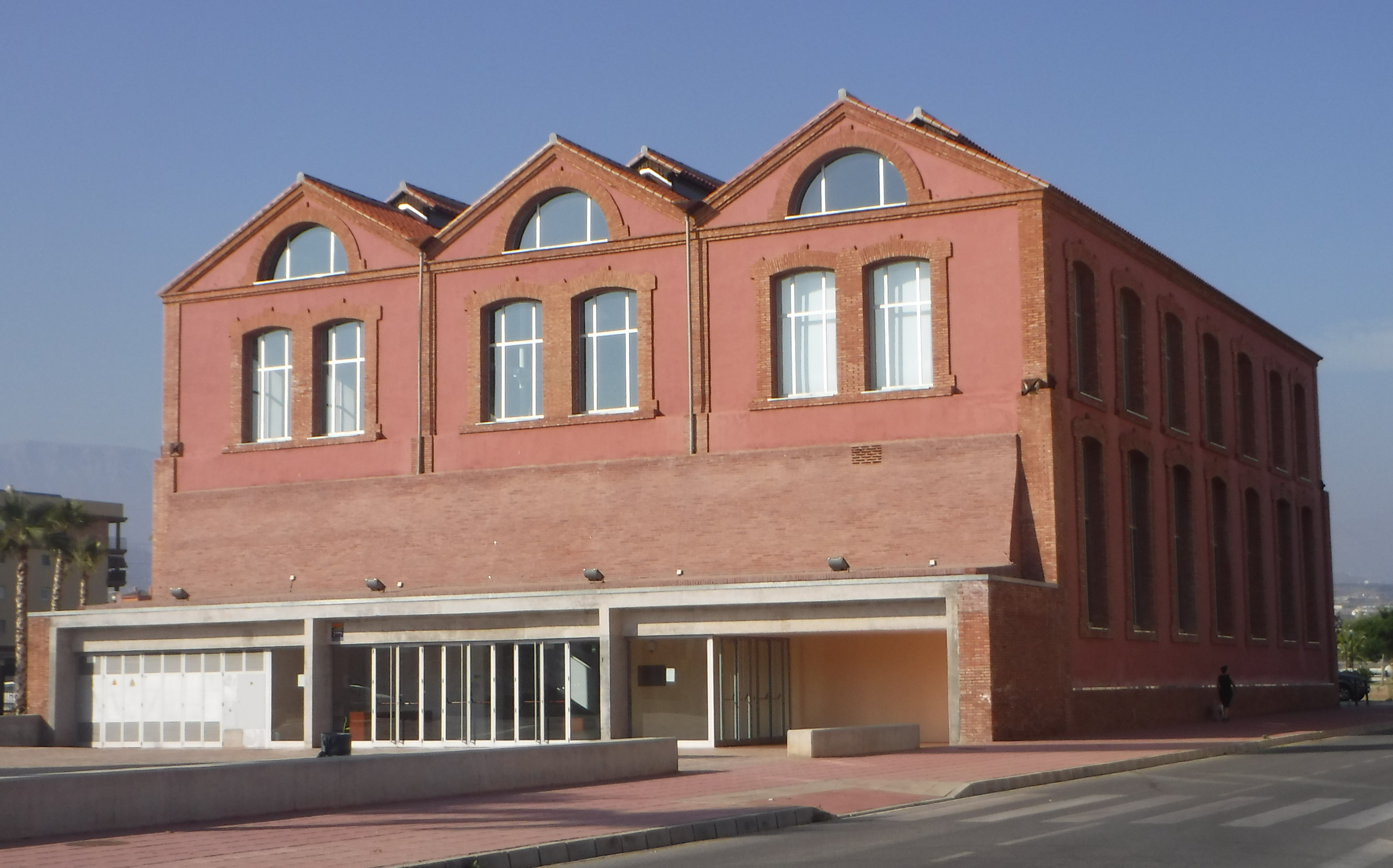
The sugar factory

It was around 1796, when José García Navarrete started producing sugar in Torre del Mar, yet it wasn’t until 1846, under Ramón de la Sagra, that the new Factory was built in the Cuban, industrial style using steam machinery. Consequently, due to an economic fiasco, it would be handed over to the Larios family under the name 'Factory of Nuestra Señora del Carmen'. The factory was used commercially until 1991, which saw the final production season. It was a fundamental element in the socioeconomic development of our town for generations. The building ended up being converted into an indisputable icon which is emblematic of the industrial patrimony of the coast of Malaga.

In 1993, the factory’s central building was restored to preserve it, this is the part that currently can be visited and is eminently for cultural use. Near this part are two original fireplaces which were part of the factory. There is also restored evaporation machinery and replica steam machinery used to obtain sugar.

=== Saint Andrew’s Parish Church ===
Due to the urban development and population increase of Torre del Mar at the end of the 1960s, the town outgrew the old neo-mudejar church, so the drastic decision to build a new temple was made.

The new building was in the modernist style, in the shape of a basilica, the layout and decoration was as prescribed by the second Vatican council predominantly reflecting simplicity, austerity and good feeling. The interior is completely diaphanous with no columns or pillars obstructing the view of the single altar, this was possible due to the new possibilities of concrete.

Traditional decoration and ornaments are considered obstacles to 'correct' worship, which led the Church to minimalism, in which the figures of Jesus Christ and the Virgin Mary should be focal and clear. The impressive size of the crucified Christ is a work of the master of religious painting, Francisco Buiza Fernández.

=== La Casa Recreo (recreational house, Tourist Office) ===
This is an ancestral home dating from the 19th century; it was a point of reference in the style of urbanisation in Torre del Mar. Nowadays, it is reformed and it sits between two infill buildings in the shape of a 'T' with a garden area in the front. The building has two floors and an original gallery has been preserved which was found in good condition prior to the reformation works.

Currently, on the lower ground, the exhibition and help-desk are located. This leaves the upper floor for the department offices for tourism. As for the central part of the building, a glass covered patio was planned, around which the different departments are distributed. The standout features are the large wooden windows.

There are views from the upper floor, looking out directly over the promenade and the sea. The building is reminiscent of the kind of architecture of housing which is closely linked to areas of leisure for the bourgeoisie of the era, who enjoyed the rooms on the weekends and in summer for entertainment and relaxation.

== Sports ==
The football club UD Torre del Mar is based in this place. It plays in the Tercera Federación – Group 9.
