= Benamargosa =

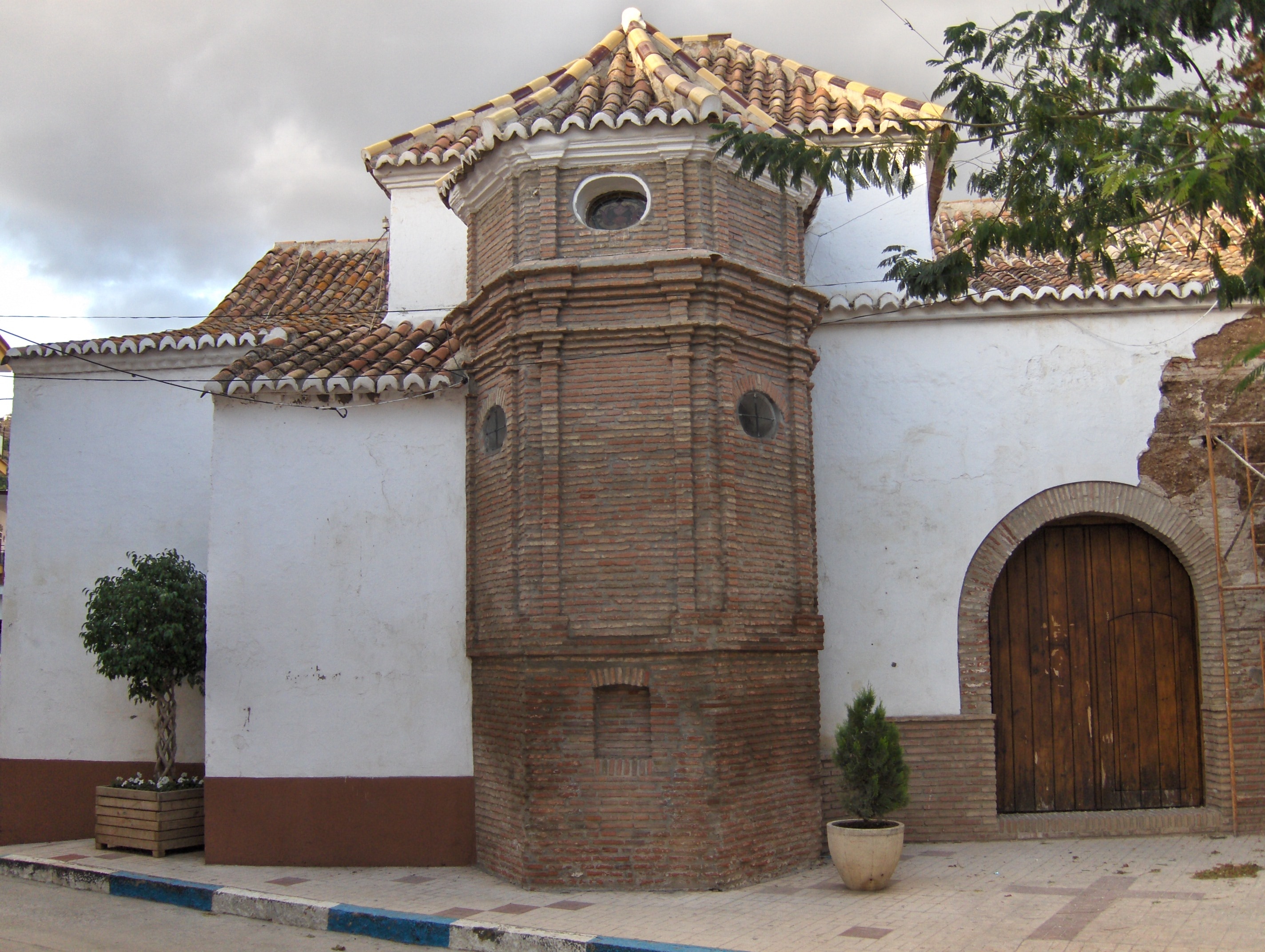
- Church of Benamargosa, Málaga, Spain

- Coat of arms

- Location in Spain.
- Coordinates: 36°50′N 4°11′W
- Sovereign state: Spain
- Autonomous community: Andalusia
- Province: Málaga

Area
  - Total: 12.12 km^{2} (4.68 sq mi)
- Elevation: 96 m (315 ft)

Population (2025-01-01)
  - Total: 1,560
  - Density: 129/km^{2} (333/sq mi)
- Time zone: UTC+1 (CET)
  - Summer (DST): UTC+2 (CEST)

Benamargosa is a town and municipality in the region of La Axarquía in the province of Málaga, part of the autonomous community of Andalusia in southern Spain. The municipality is situated approximately 11 kilometres from Vélez Málaga and 46 from the provincial capital. It has a population of approximately 1,500 residents. The natives are called Benamargoseños.

== See also ==
- List of municipalities in Málaga
