= Axarquía =

Coordinates: 36°50′N 04°10′W

- Comarca
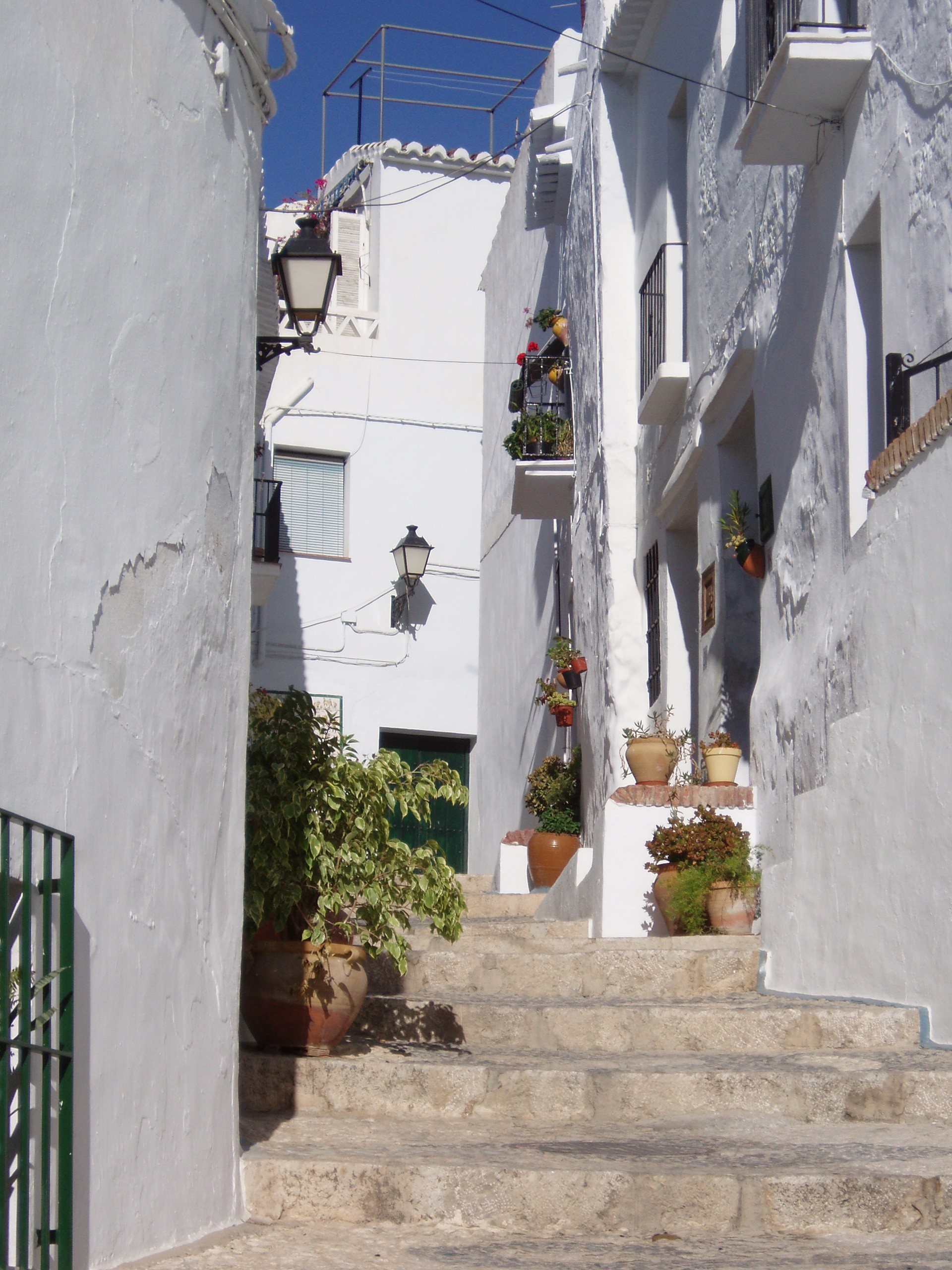
- Street in Frigiliana.

- Location of Axarquía in Andalusia, Spain

- Location of Axarquía in the province of Málaga
- Country: Spain
- Autonomous community: Andalucía
- Province: Málaga

Area
  - Total: 1,023.6 km^{2} (395.2 sq mi)
- Elevation: 2,066 m (6,778 ft)

Population (2023) (Note: Estimate at 1 January 2023: National Statistics Institute (Spain))
  - Total: 228,556
  - Density: 223.29/km^{2} (578.31/sq mi)

Axarquía (Spanish pronunciation: [axaɾˈki.a]) is a comarca in the province of Málaga, Andalusia in southern Spain. It is the wedge-shaped area east of Málaga. Its name is traced back to Arabic الشرقية (aš-Šarqiyya, meaning "the eastern [region]"). It extends along the coast and inland. Its coastal towns make up the Costa del Sol Oriental - one of the sunniest places in mainland Spain with the average of 320 sunny days a year. The natives of the region are called axárquicos.

The comarca is composed of 31 municipalities, of which the capital is Vélez-Málaga. The Vélez, Algarrobo and Torrox rivers all run through the region. Its highest mountain is La Maroma, highest point of the Sierra de Tejeda, Penibaetic System.

The Axarquía comarca is also known as Axarquía-Costa del Sol, for it includes the Costa del Sol Oriental sector of the Costa del Sol, east of Málaga city made up of Rincón de la Victoria, Vélez-Málaga, Algarrobo, Torrox and Nerja municipal terms. This comarca was established in 2003 by the Government of Andalusia.

== Etymology ==
The Dictionary of the Spanish Royal Academy defines the word "jarquía" (xarquía in old Castilian) as "district or territory located east of a great city and dependent on it" and says that it proceeds from Arabic شرقية Šarqiyya, meaning "eastern part" or " eastern." It coincides with the region of Axarquia which lies in the east of Málaga. The Royal Academy, in its spelling of the Spanish Language, 1999 edition, explains that, in old Castilian, consonant fricative phoneme [x] represented the palatal [ʃ] as in English sh sound, found in words like Axarquía, Don Quixote, Mexico, Texas etc.

== Municipalities ==
The Axarquía comarca consists of the following municipalities:

Arms	Municipality	Area (km²)	Population (2023) (Note: Estimate at 1 January 2023: National Statistics Institute (Spain))	Density (/km^{2})
	Alcaucín	45.1	2,554	56.6
	Alfarnate	34.0	1,059	31.1
	Alfarnatejo	20.4	380	18.6
	Algarrobo	9.7	6,773	698.2
	Almáchar	14.4	1,848	128.3
	Árchez	4.8	391	81.5
	Arenas	26.3	1,264	48.1
	Benamargosa	12.1	1,557	128.7
	Benamocarra	5.7	3,079	540.2
	El Borge	24.4	925	37.9
	Canillas de Aceituno	42.0	1,767	42.1
	Canillas de Albaida	33.2	801	24.1
	Colmenar	66.0	3,494	52.94
	Comares	25.5	1,339	52.51
	Cómpeta	54.2	3,875	71.5
	Cútar	19.4	592	30.5
	Frigiliana	40.5	3,322	82.0
	Iznate	7.5	915	122.0
	Macharaviaya	7.2	523	72.6
	Moclinejo	14.3	1,220	85.3
	Nerja	85.1	21,913	257.5
	Periana	58.8	3,290	56.0
	Rincón de la Victoria	28.5	51,300	1,800
	Riogordo	40.0	2,795	69.9
	Salares	10.3	187	18.2
	Sayalonga	18.3	1,647	90.0
	Sedella	31.6	611	19.3
	Torrox	50.0	20,932	418.6
	Totalán	9.2	767	83.4
	Vélez-Málaga	157.9	85,377	540.7
	Viñuela	27.2	2,059	75.7
	Totals	1,023.6	228,556	223.3

== See also ==
- Baetic System
- Comarcas of Andalusia
