= Alozaina =

- Municipality
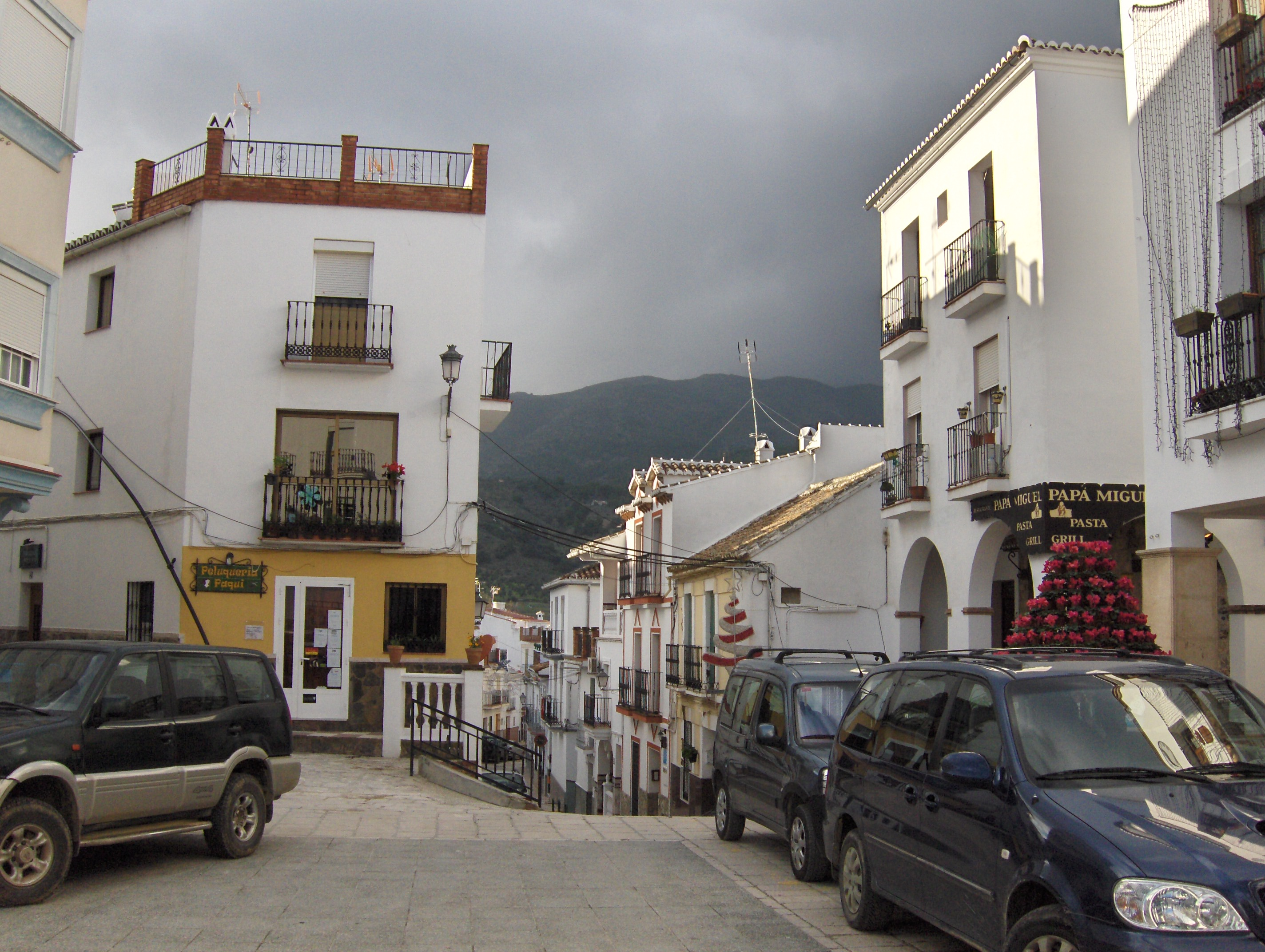

- Flag Coat of arms

- Municipal location in the Province of Málaga

- Location in Spain
- Coordinates: 36°43′33″N 4°51′29″W
- Sovereign state: Spain
- Autonomous community: Andalusia
- Province: Málaga
- Comarca: Sierra de las Nieves

Government

Population (2025-01-01)
  - Total: 2,127
- Demonym: Pecheros
- Time zone: UTC+1 (CET)
  - Summer (DST): UTC+2 (CEST)
- Website: http://www.alozaina.es

Alozaina is a town and municipality in the province of Málaga, part of the autonomous community of Andalusia in southern Spain. It is located between Tolox, Casarabonela and Yunquera and in the foothills of the Sierra de las Nieves in its transition to the Hoya de Málaga. The municipality is situated approximately 52 kilometers from Málaga and 41 from the city of Ronda. It has a population of approximately 2,200 residents. Its surface area is 33.85 km^{2} and has a density of 66.23 inhabitants/km^{2}. It is one of eight pueblo blancos that "guard the Sierra de las Nieves". In the past ten years a transformation has taken place, from a dusty somewhat shabby rural village to a lively community proud of its traditions and enhanced by many new amenities.

Natives of the town are called Pecheros.

== History ==
=== Prehistory ===
From the Upper Palaeolithic (Solutrean period) dates a small spindle-shaped idol, which is preserved in the Provincial Museum of Málaga, which also attests to the presence of man during the Neolithic and later periods. From the Neolithic are the remains of the area called "the flat", where there was a village with a very large cemetery, but was devastated and now only 3 graves in good condition remain.

In the "Cave of the Table" a burial and two golden trumpets were found from the Bronze Age, and both can be found in the Archaeological Museum of Málaga. From the time of the Iberians, possibly the Phoenicians, tombs have been found with decorated pottery and other objects.

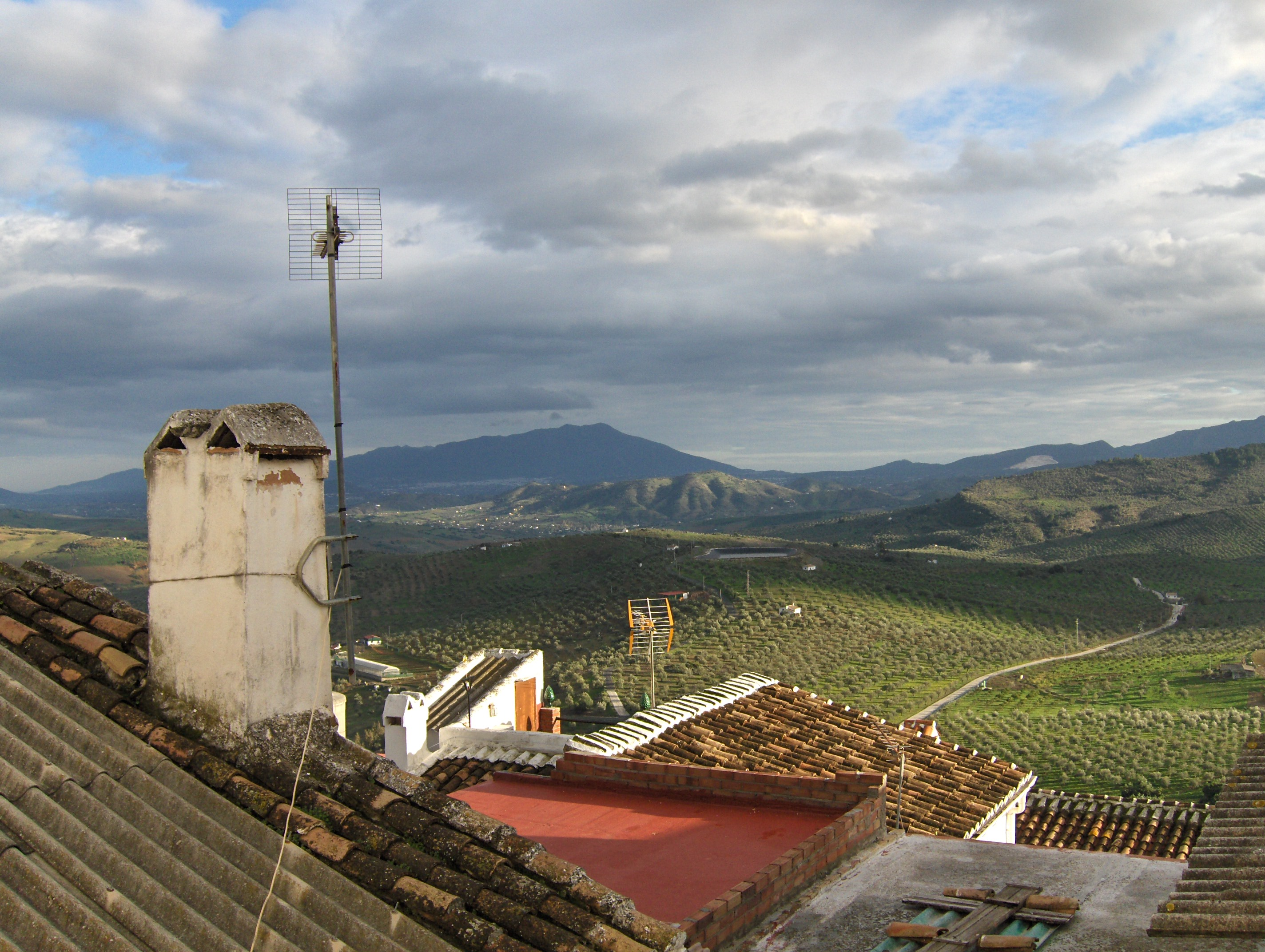
Alozaina fields

=== Ancient period ===
Roman urban vestiges have been found in the place of a settlement of Ardite families who inhabited the area in a stable but without shaping a city. It was supposed to serve for travelers who used this area as a rest en route to Acinipo (Ronda) or to Cartima or Malacca, looking for an exit to the sea. These people had a way of life through farming and ranching on a small scale. One can still catch a glimpse of what was a small cemetery in the so-called Hill of Ardite.

The Romans also left their mark on the Monte's prospect (Albar area), where they found a column and different types of altar stone. The Valentine area is also rich in Roman and Arabic ruins. Amphorae have appeared in Italy. They were signed by potters of this land who allegedly used them to trade or fill them with oil to feed the empire, although they have not found remains of mills from this period, though they may have existed.

=== Middle Ages ===
With the arrival of Muslims, the watchtowers of Ardite and "Aloçaina" were built. Aloçaina would become a small fortress, the origin of the town, and gave the town its name (Arabic الحُصَينة, al-Ḥuṣaina, meaning "fortress").

== See also ==
- List of municipalities in Málaga
