= Alfarnatejo =

- Municipality and town
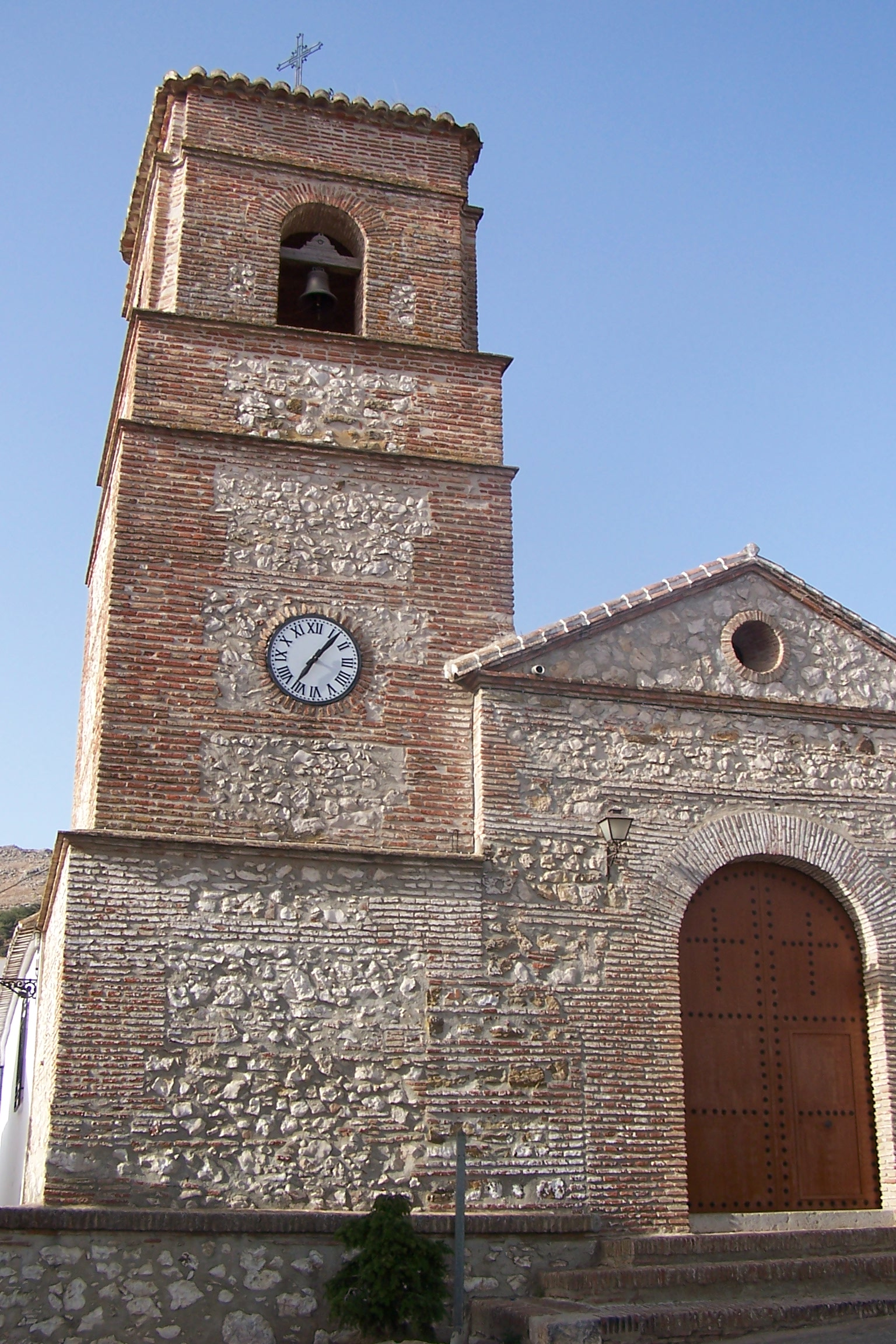
- Alfarnatejo church

- Flag Coat of arms

- Municipal location in Málaga Province

- Location in Spain
- Coordinates: 36°59′N 4°16′W
- Country: Spain
- Autonomous community: Andalucía
- Province: Málaga Province
- Comarca: Axarquía - Costa del Sol

Area
  - Total: 7.7 sq mi (20 km^{2})
- Elevation: 2,946 ft (898 m)

Population (2025-01-01)
  - Total: 358
  - Density: 58/sq mi (22.4/km^{2})
- Time zone: UTC+1 (CET)
  - Summer (DST): UTC+2 (CEST)
- Website: http://www.alfarnatejo.es

Alfarnatejo is a town and municipality in the province of Málaga, part of the autonomous community of Andalusia in southern Spain. The municipality is situated approximately 50 km from the city of Málaga. It has a population of approximately 400 residents. The natives are called Tejones and the town's neighbors in Alfarnate are Palancos. Alfarnatejo's demonym is related to the town's water fountain, named 'La Teja', which means roof tile.

It is located near the Sierra del Jobo in the northwest and the Sierra de Alhama in the east in the mountainous region of Axarquía. To the east lies the town of Alfarnate, to the west lies Colmenar, and it shares its southern border with Riogordo and Periana.

The town is surrounded by several notable peaks, including 'Pico Chamizo' (1637m), and 'Pico Gallo' (1356m) and 'Pico del Vilo' (1412), two peaks which can be done together as part of a popular hiking route.

== See also ==
- List of municipalities in Málaga
