= El Borge =

Coordinates: 36.817°N 4.233°W

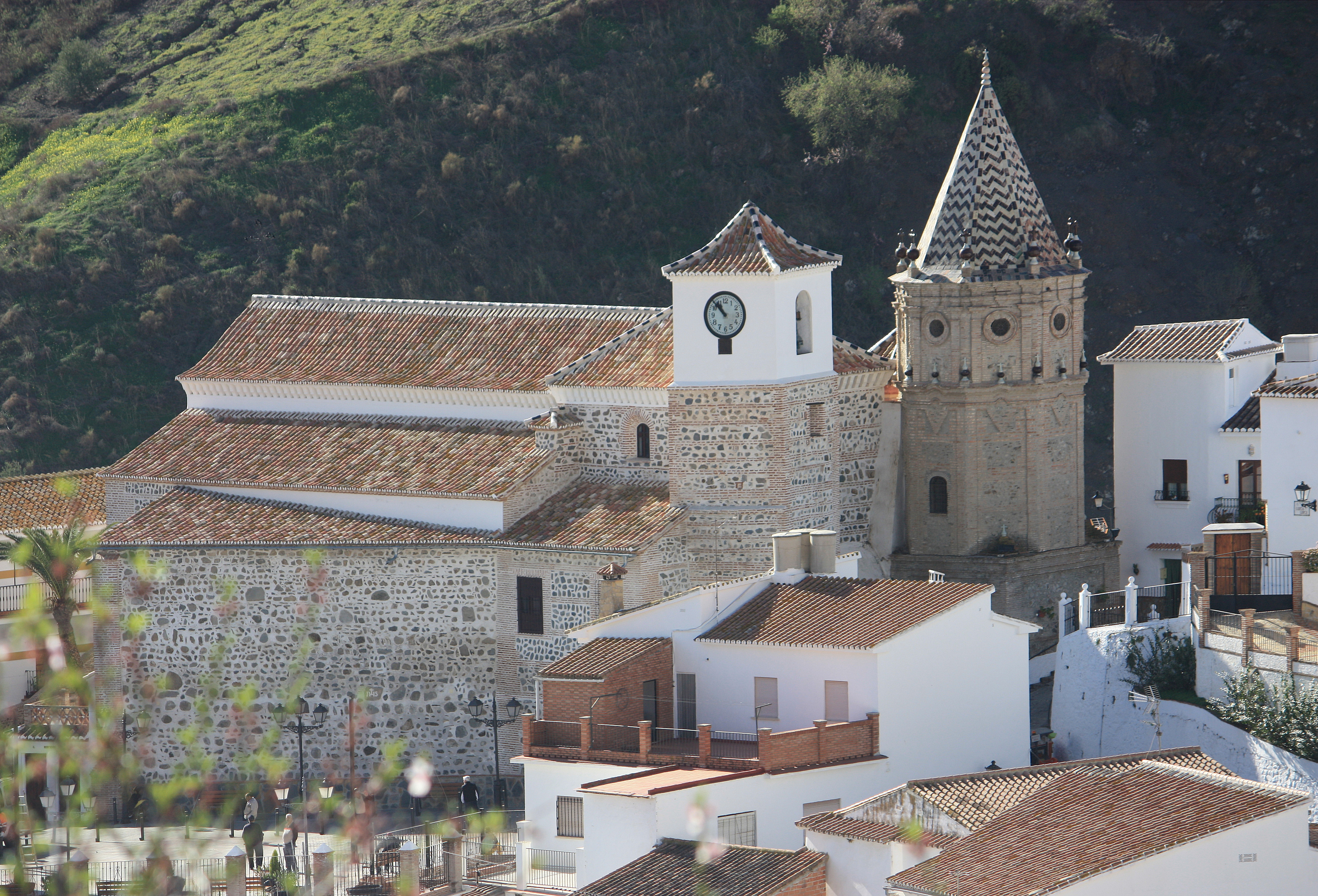
- View of El Borge

- Flag Coat of arms

- Location in Spain.
- Country: Spain
- Autonomous community: Andalusia

Area
  - Total: 24 km^{2} (9.3 sq mi)
- Elevation: 257 m (843 ft)

Population (2025-01-01)
  - Total: 958
  - Density: 40/km^{2} (100/sq mi)
- Time zone: UTC+1 (CET)
  - Summer (DST): UTC+2 (CEST)
- Website: www.elborge.es

El Borge is a town and municipality in the province of Málaga, part of the autonomous community of Andalusia in southern Spain. It is located in the comarca of Axarquía. The municipality is situated approximately 24 kilometers from Vélez-Málaga, 28 from the provincial capital of Málaga and 567 km from Madrid. It has a population of approximately 1,000 residents. The natives are called Borgeños.

The town of El Borge is situated at the foot of the Cerro de Cútar mountain, on the border of the Axarquia and Montes de Malaga comarcas, and is known as the "raisin capital" for its large production of Muscatel raisins, which have DO (denominacion de origin) status.

El Borge has some degree of notoriety as the birthplace of one of the most famous bandits in 19th-century Malaga province, Luis Muñoz Garcia, known as the Bizco de El Borge. His birthplace has been converted into a rural hotel with a small museum dedicated to banditry.

Local products include the local Muscat raisins and wine, ajoblanco (chilled almond soup), gazpacho (chilled tomato soup) with lima beans or cucumber, tortillas de bacalao con miel de caña (cod tortillas with honey) and hornazo del día de San Marcos (a bread-like desert with a boiled egg in the middle).

A fiesta known as Dia de la Pasa (Raisin Day) is held on the third Sunday of September. Other celebrations include the Fiestas Patronales en honor de San Gabriel Arcángel (celebrations in honour of the Archangel St Gabriel) that take place at the end of Semana Santa (Spanish Holy Week), the Feast of Saint Mark on 25 April, the Romería de San Isidro on 15 May, and at the end of June the Noche de las Candelas.

== See also ==
- List of municipalities in Málaga
