= List of municipalities in Málaga =

Map of Spain with the province of Málaga highlighted

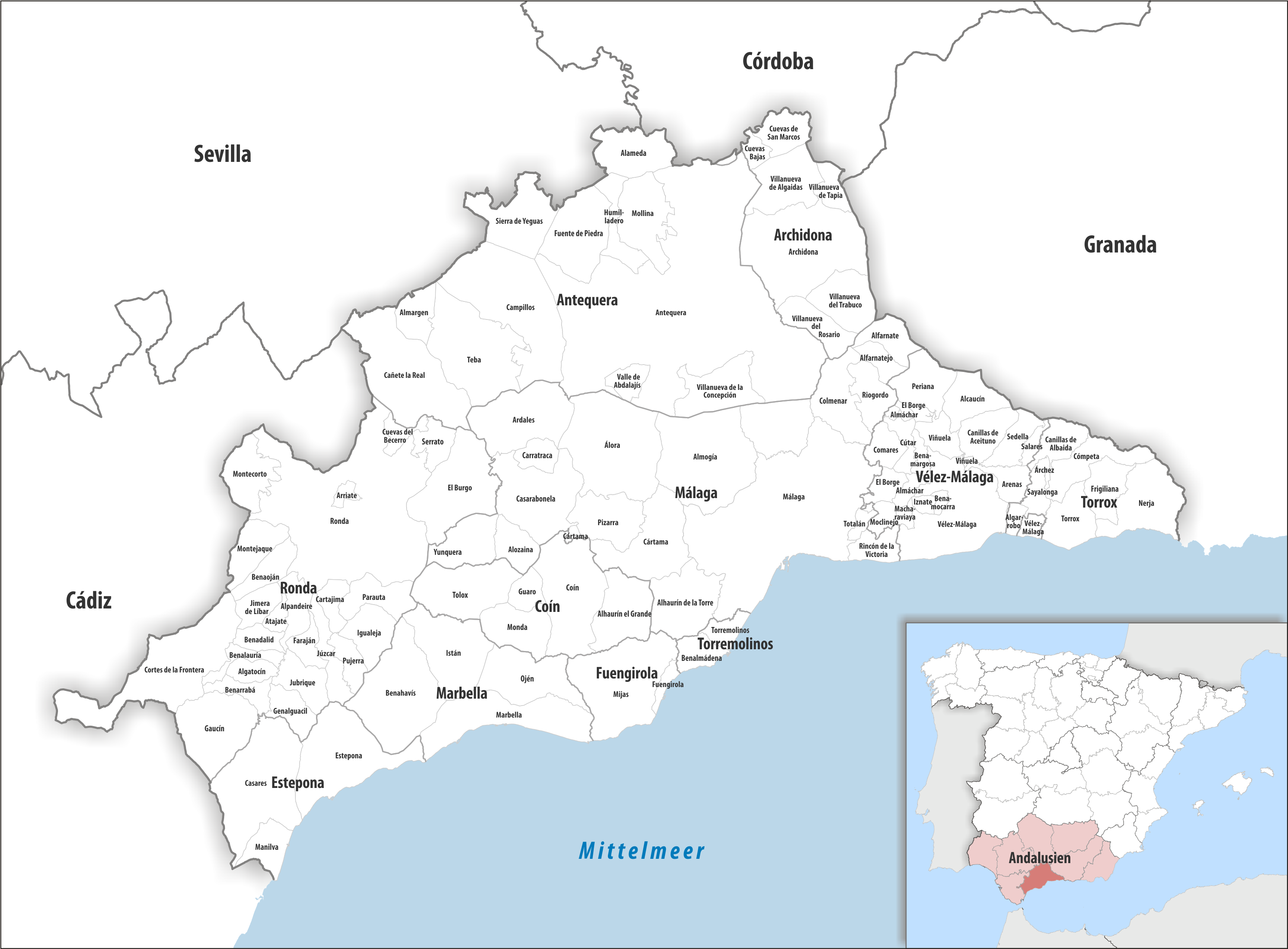
Map of the municipalities in the province of Málaga

Málaga is a province in the autonomous community of Andalusia, Spain. The province is divided into 103 municipalities. As of the 2024 Spanish census, Málaga is the 6th most populous of Spain's 50 provinces, with 1,774,701 inhabitants, and the 35th largest by land area, spanning 7,307.77 square kilometres (2,821.55 sq mi). Municipalities are the most basic local political division in Spain and can only belong to one province. They enjoy a large degree of autonomy in their local administration, being in charge of tasks such as urban planning, water supply, lighting, roads, local police, and firefighting.

The organisation of municipalities in Spain is outlined by the local government law Ley 7/1985, de 2 de abril, Reguladora de las Bases del Régimen Local (transl. Law 7/1985, of 2 April, Regulating the Bases of the Local Administration), which was passed by the Cortes Generales—Spain's national parliament—on 2 April 1985 and finalised by royal decree on 18 April 1986. Municipalities in Málaga are also governed by the Statute of Autonomy of Andalusia, which includes provisions concerning their relations with Andalusia's autonomous government. All citizens of Spain are required to register in the municipality in which they reside. Each municipality is a corporation (Note: Within the context of local government in Spain, a corporation is a legal entity representing a municipality. Each municipality is empowered to govern over a specific piece of land and its population.) with independent legal personhood: its governing body is called the ayuntamiento (municipal council or corporation), a term often also used to refer to the municipal offices (city and town halls). The ayuntamiento is composed of the mayor (Spanish: alcalde), the deputy mayors (tenientes de alcalde) and the councillors (concejales), who form the plenary (pleno), the deliberative body. Municipalities are categorised by population for determining the number of councillors: three when the population is up to 100 inhabitants, five for 101–250, seven for 251–1,000, nine for 1,001–2,000, eleven for 2,001–5,000, thirteen for 5,001–10,000, seventeen for 10,001–20,000, twenty-one for 20,001–50,000, and twenty-five for 50,001–100,000. One councillor is added for every additional 100,000 inhabitants, with a further one included if the total would otherwise be even, to avoid tied votes.

The mayor and the deputy mayors are elected by the plenary assembly, which is itself elected by universal suffrage. Elections in municipalities with more than 250 inhabitants are carried out following a proportional representation system with closed lists, whilst those with a population lower than 250 use a block plurality voting system with open lists. The plenary assembly must meet periodically, with meetings occurring more or less frequently depending on the population of the municipality: monthly for those whose population is larger than 20,000, once every two months if it ranges between 5,001 and 20,000, and once every three months if it does not exceed 5,000. Many ayuntamientos also have a local governing board (Spanish: junta de gobierno local), which is appointed by the mayor from amongst the councillors and is required for municipalities of over 5,000 inhabitants. The board, whose role is to assist the mayor between meetings of the plenary assembly, may not include more than one third of the councillors.

The largest municipality by population in the province as of the 2024 Spanish census is Málaga, its capital, with 592,346 residents, while the smallest is Atajate, with 196 residents. The largest municipality by area is Antequera, which spans 748.03 square kilometres (288.82 sq mi), while Árchez is the smallest at 4.80 square kilometres (1.85 sq mi).

== Municipalities ==
Largest municipalities in the province of Málaga by population

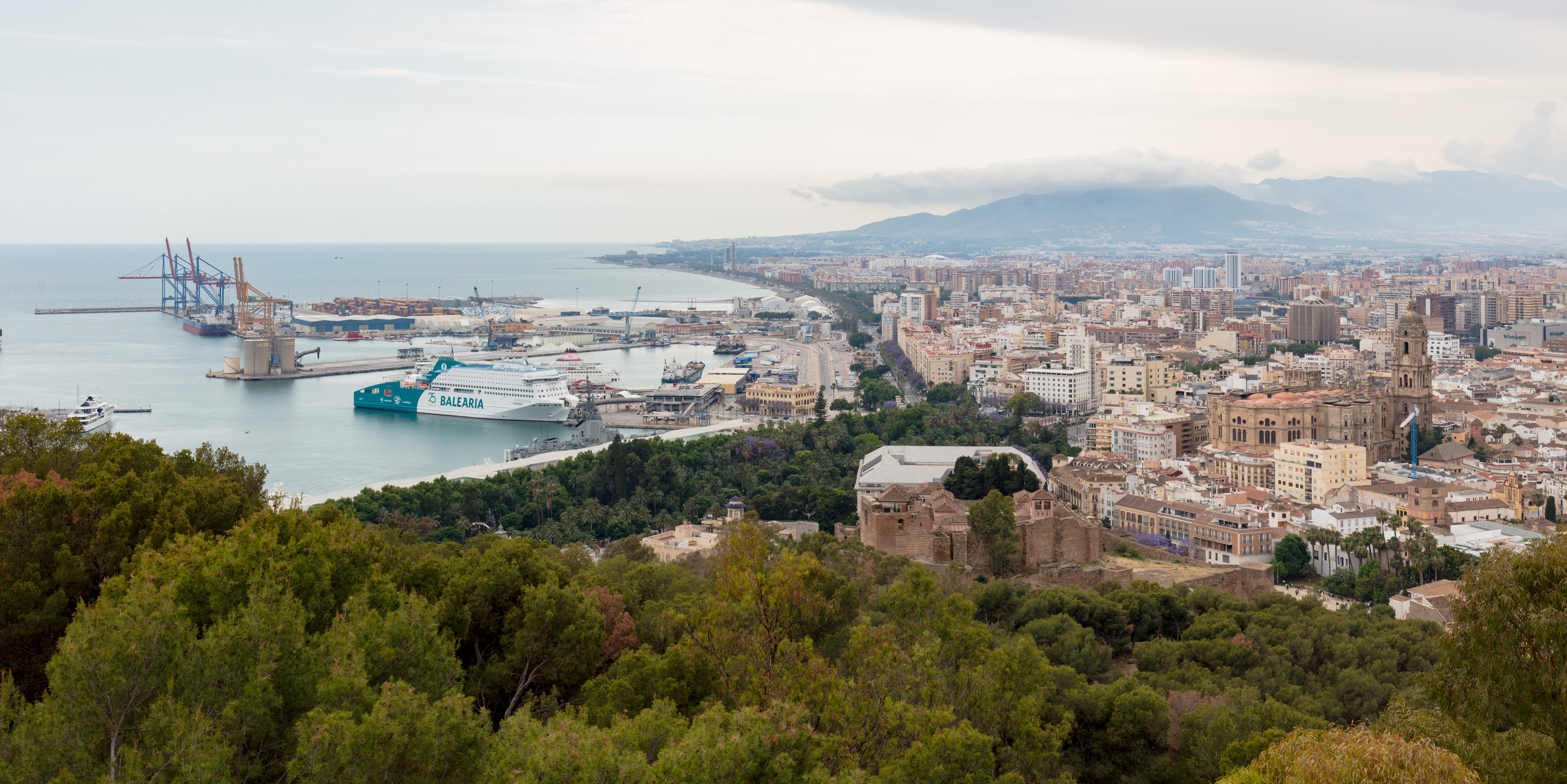
Málaga is the province's capital and largest municipality by population.

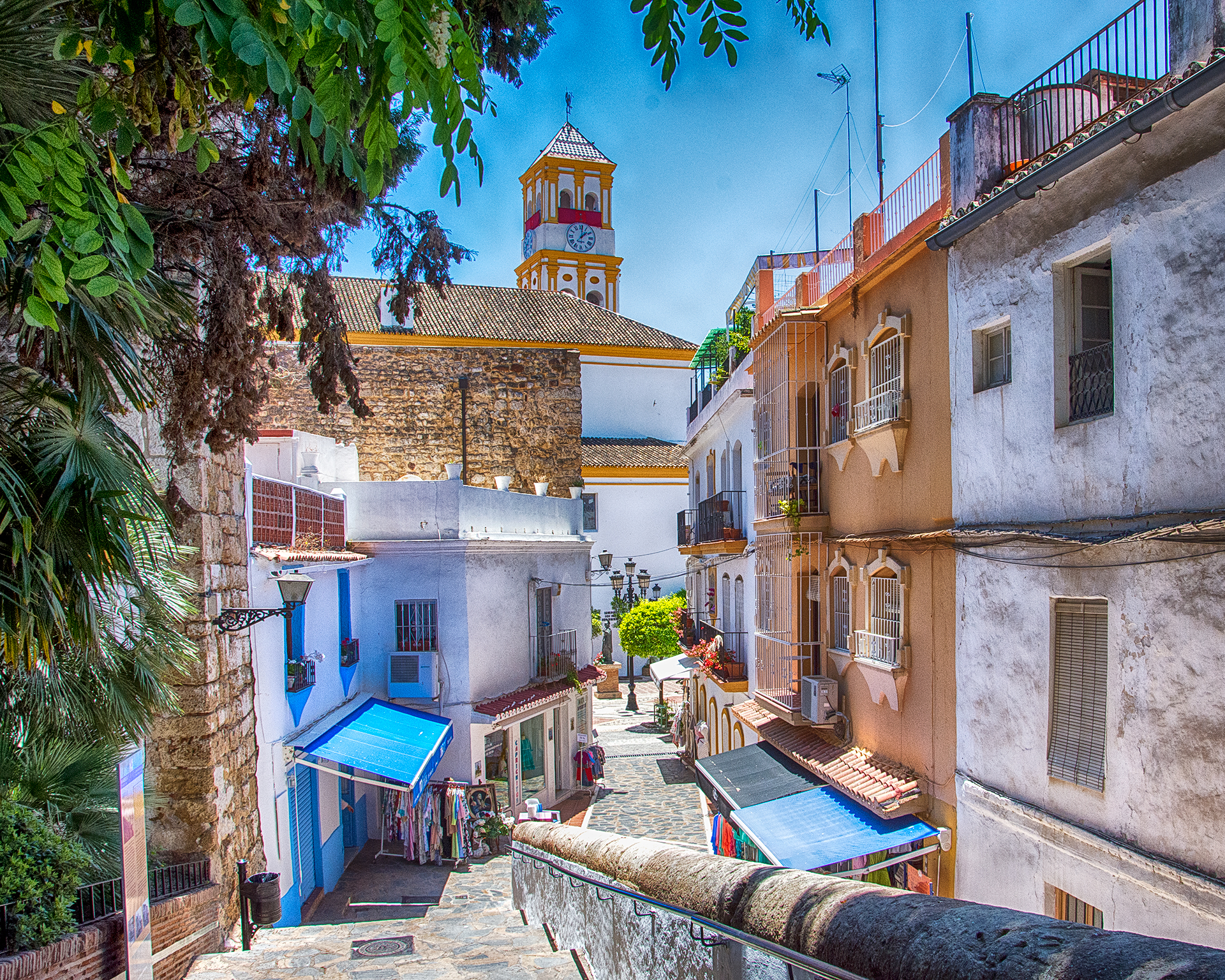
Marbella, the second largest municipality by population in the province of Málaga

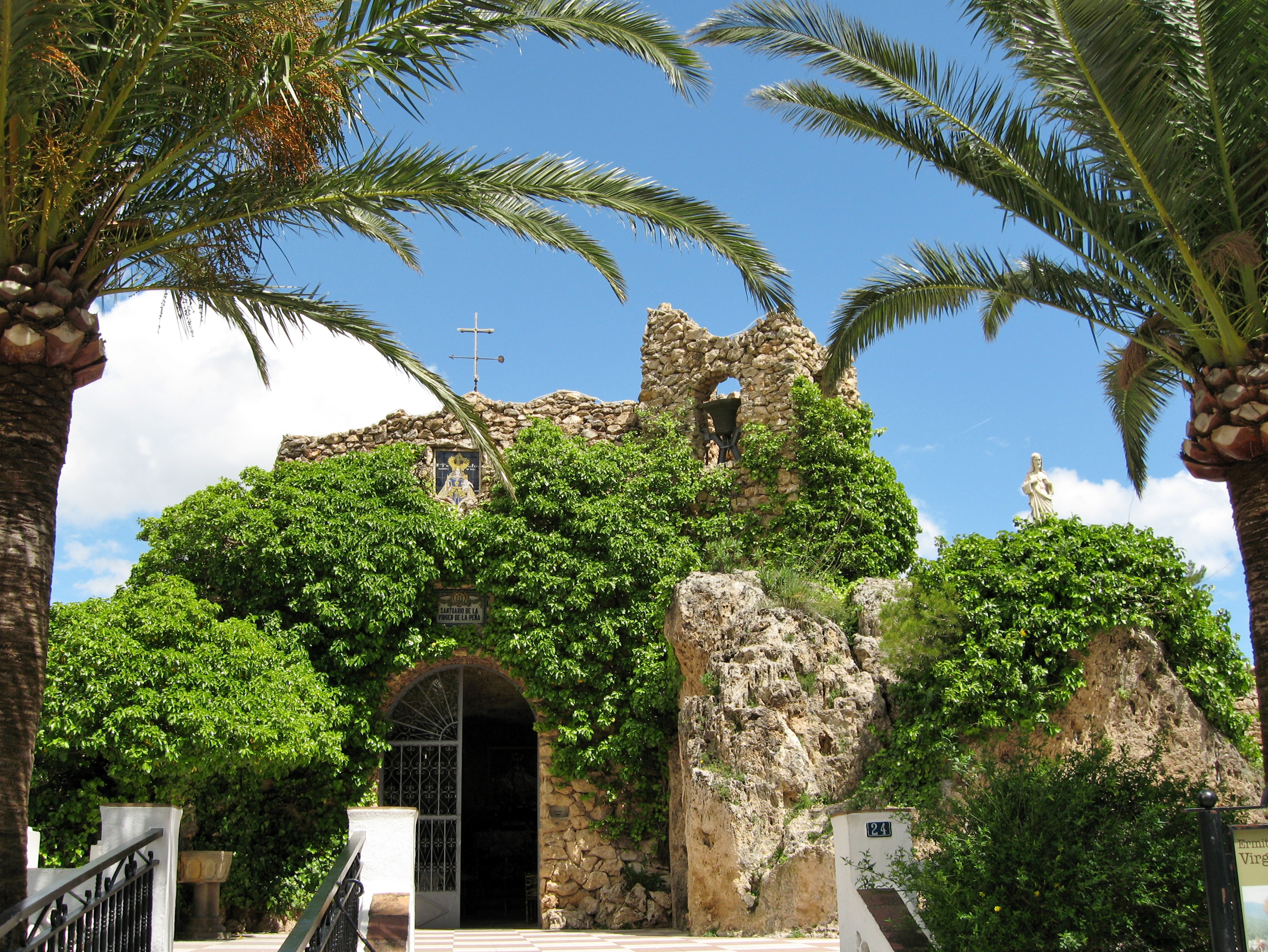
Mijas is the province of Málaga's third largest municipality by population.

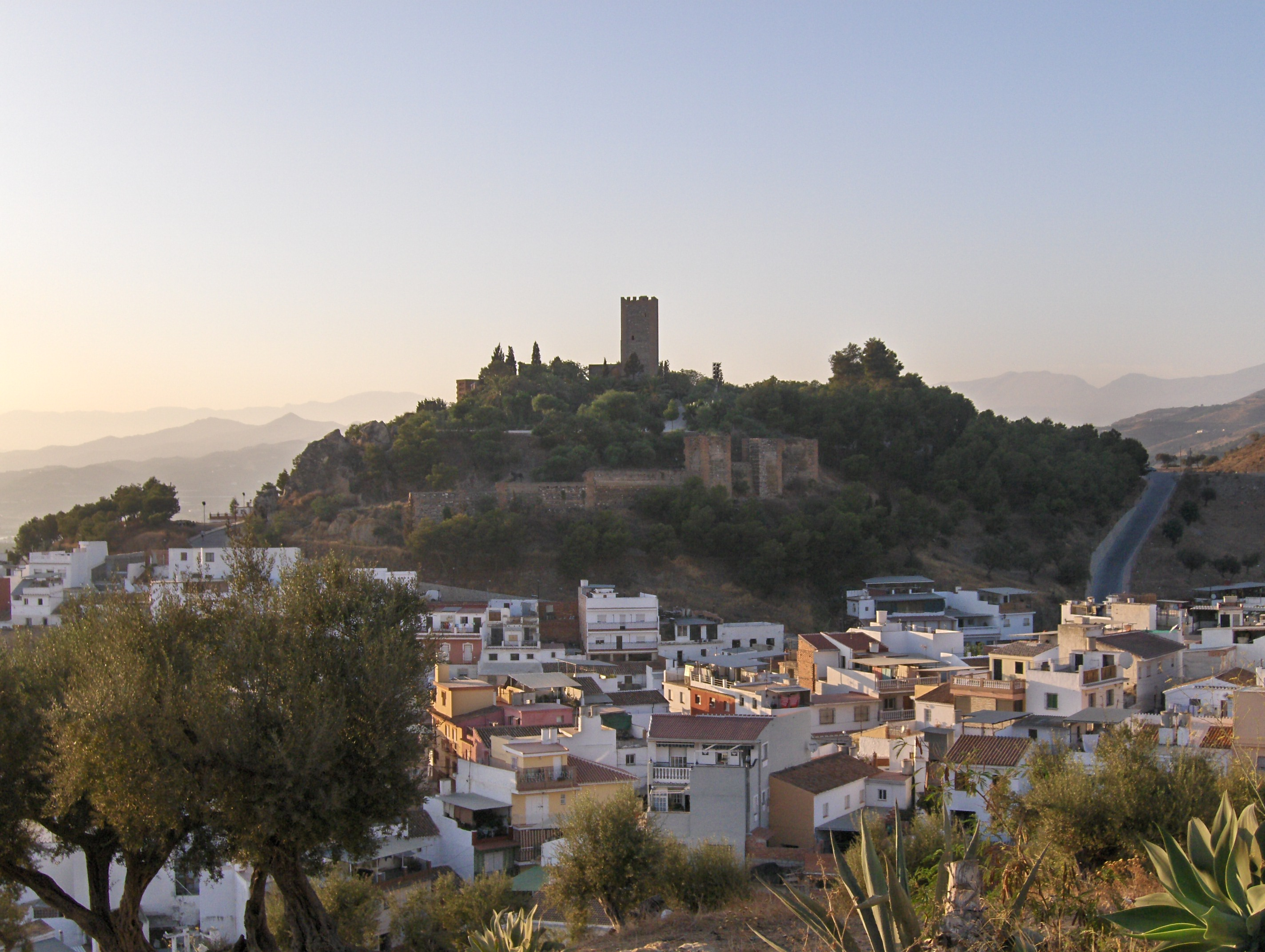
Vélez-Málaga, the province of Málaga's fourth largest municipality by population

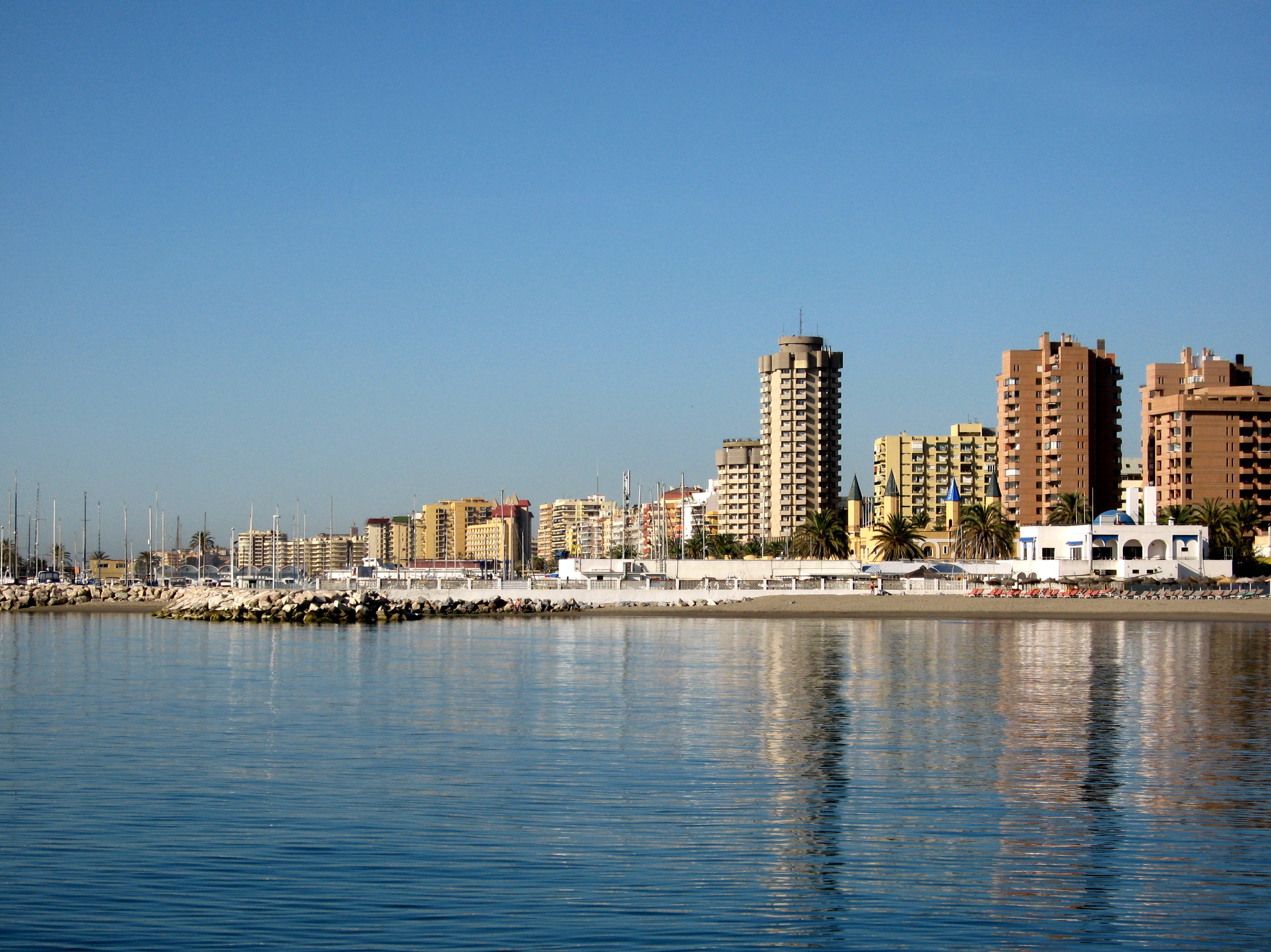
Fuengirola, the fifth largest municipality by population in the province of Málaga

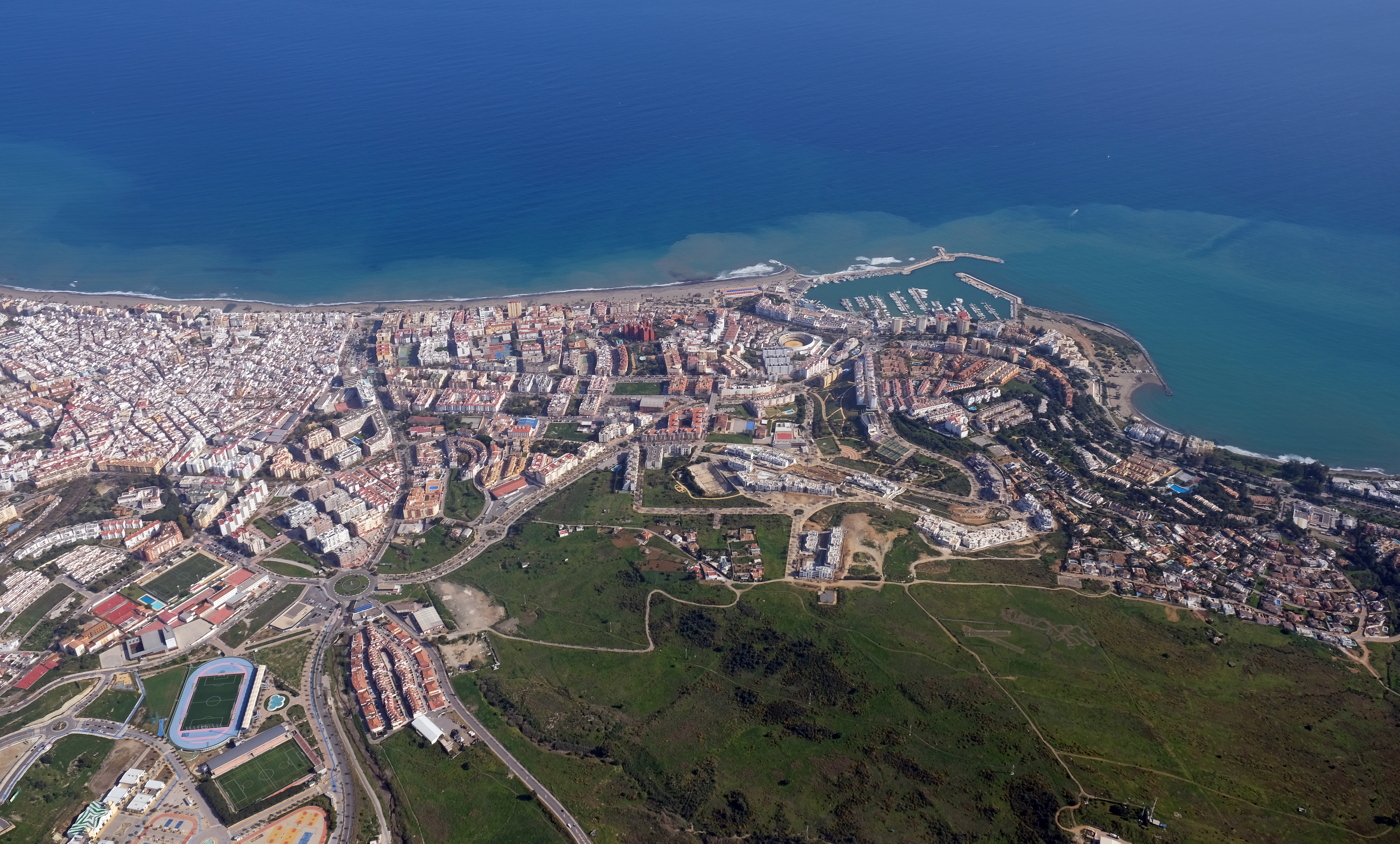
Estepona is the province of Málaga's sixth largest municipality by population.

† Provincial capital

Municipalities in the province of Málaga
Name	Population (2024 census)	Population (2011 census)	Population change	Land area (km^{2})	Population density (2024)
Alameda	5,439	5,481	−0.8%	65.11	83.5/km^{2}
Alcaucín	2,691	2,946	−8.7%	45.19	59.5/km^{2}
Alfarnate	1,045	1,295	−19.3%	34.00	30.7/km^{2}
Alfarnatejo	371	513	−27.7%	20.36	18.2/km^{2}
Algarrobo	6,898	6,229	+10.7%	9.74	708.2/km^{2}
Algatocín	838	870	−3.7%	19.71	42.5/km^{2}
Alhaurín de la Torre	44,572	37,020	+20.4%	82.70	539.0/km^{2}
Alhaurín el Grande	26,540	23,164	+14.6%	73.10	363.1/km^{2}
Almáchar	1,921	1,892	+1.5%	14.40	133.4/km^{2}
Almargen	1,931	2,160	−10.6%	34.37	56.2/km^{2}
Almogía	4,142	4,081	+1.5%	162.89	25.4/km^{2}
Álora	13,524	13,273	+1.9%	170.07	79.5/km^{2}
Alozaina	2,127	2,210	−3.8%	33.85	62.8/km^{2}
Alpandeire	254	276	−8.0%	31.24	8.1/km^{2}
Antequera	41,578	41,741	−0.4%	748.03	55.6/km^{2}
Árchez	416	456	−8.8%	4.80	86.7/km^{2}
Archidona	8,020	8,754	−8.4%	186.46	43.0/km^{2}
Ardales	2,512	2,607	−3.6%	106.46	23.6/km^{2}
Arenas	1,295	1,339	−3.3%	26.57	48.7/km^{2}
Arriate	4,084	4,143	−1.4%	8.27	493.8/km^{2}
Atajate	196	171	+14.6%	10.90	18.0/km^{2}
Benadalid	232	250	−7.2%	20.67	11.2/km^{2}
Benahavís	9,256	5,053	+83.2%	145.39	63.7/km^{2}
Benalauría	464	510	−9.0%	19.75	23.5/km^{2}
Benalmádena	78,011	61,394	+27.1%	26.91	2,899.0/km^{2}
Benamargosa	1,546	1,565	−1.2%	12.12	127.6/km^{2}
Benamocarra	3,108	3,066	+1.4%	5.74	541.5/km^{2}
Benaoján	1,433	1,533	−6.5%	32.00	44.8/km^{2}
Benarrabá	466	558	−16.5%	24.90	18.7/km^{2}
El Borge	940	1,025	−8.3%	24.39	38.5/km^{2}
El Burgo	1,756	1,959	−10.4%	118.35	14.8/km^{2}
Campillos	8,491	8,635	−1.7%	187.44	45.3/km^{2}
Canillas de Aceituno	1,761	1,873	−6.0%	42.05	41.9/km^{2}
Canillas de Albaida	813	900	−9.7%	33.22	24.5/km^{2}
Cañete la Real	1,590	1,949	−18.4%	164.97	9.6/km^{2}
Carratraca	782	840	−6.9%	22.47	34.8/km^{2}
Cartajima	229	255	−10.2%	21.47	10.7/km^{2}
Cártama	28,849	23,225	+24.2%	105.13	274.4/km^{2}
Casabermeja	4,074	3,608	+12.9%	67.62	60.2/km^{2}
Casarabonela	2,781	2,680	+3.8%	113.24	24.6/km^{2}
Casares	8,528	5,276	+61.6%	162.34	52.5/km^{2}
Coín	25,763	21,692	+18.8%	127.46	202.1/km^{2}
Colmenar	3,545	3,560	−0.4%	65.95	53.8/km^{2}
Comares	1,340	1,508	−11.1%	25.50	52.5/km^{2}
Cómpeta	3,623	3,620	+0.1%	54.23	66.8/km^{2}
Cortes de la Frontera	3,032	3,515	−13.7%	175.28	17.3/km^{2}
Cuevas Bajas	1,341	1,475	−9.1%	16.54	81.1/km^{2}
Cuevas del Becerro	1,601	1,751	−8.6%	16.30	98.2/km^{2}
Cuevas de San Marcos	3,627	4,018	−9.7%	36.89	98.3/km^{2}
Cútar	589	641	−8.1%	19.42	30.3/km^{2}
Estepona	78,590	64,468	+21.9%	137.37	572.1/km^{2}
Faraján	284	286	−0.7%	20.41	13.9/km^{2}
Frigiliana	3,392	3,149	+7.7%	40.51	83.7/km^{2}
Fuengirola	85,646	72,019	+18.9%	10.31	8,307.1/km^{2}
Fuente de Piedra	2,973	2,653	+12.1%	90.55	32.8/km^{2}
Gaucín	1,592	1,692	−5.9%	98.24	16.2/km^{2}
Genalguacil	404	499	−19.0%	31.87	12.7/km^{2}
Guaro	2,486	2,226	+11.7%	22.40	111.0/km^{2}
Humilladero	3,366	3,340	+0.8%	34.66	97.1/km^{2}
Igualeja	777	887	−12.4%	43.87	17.7/km^{2}
Iznate	951	924	+2.9%	7.47	127.3/km^{2}
Jimera de Líbar	399	458	−12.9%	27.17	14.7/km^{2}
Jubrique	586	718	−18.4%	39.32	14.9/km^{2}
Júzcar	228	239	−4.6%	33.66	6.8/km^{2}
Macharaviaya	508	496	+2.4%	7.26	70.0/km^{2}
Málaga†	592,346	561,435	+5.5%	395.71	1,496.9/km^{2}
Manilva	17,980	13,510	+33.1%	35.58	505.3/km^{2}
Marbella	159,054	135,124	+17.7%	117.15	1,357.7/km^{2}
Mijas	92,211	74,028	+24.6%	148.73	620.0/km^{2}
Moclinejo	1,239	1,283	−3.4%	14.37	86.2/km^{2}
Mollina	5,467	5,115	+6.9%	74.56	73.3/km^{2}
Monda	3,015	2,470	+22.1%	57.65	52.3/km^{2}
Montecorto	599	No data (Note: Montecorto was partitioned from Ronda and became an independent municipality in 2014 and is thus not included in the 2011 census.)		54.49	11.0/km^{2}
Montejaque	952	1,016	−6.3%	45.46	20.9/km^{2}
Nerja	22,078	21,086	+4.7%	85.12	259.4/km^{2}
Ojén	4,721	3,256	+45.0%	85.61	55.1/km^{2}
Parauta	283	248	+14.1%	44.44	6.4/km^{2}
Periana	3,389	3,502	−3.2%	58.75	57.7/km^{2}
Pizarra	10,187	9,099	+12.0%	63.63	160.1/km^{2}
Pujerra	291	328	−11.3%	24.38	11.9/km^{2}
Rincón de la Victoria	52,043	41,040	+26.8%	28.00	1,858.7/km^{2}
Riogordo	2,795	3,030	−7.8%	39.98	69.9/km^{2}
Ronda	33,520	36,473	−8.1%	397.24	84.4/km^{2}
Salares	204	231	−11.7%	10.29	19.8/km^{2}
Sayalonga	1,624	1,477	+10.0%	18.30	88.7/km^{2}
Sedella	606	672	−9.8%	31.61	19.2/km^{2}
Serrato	458	No data (Note: Serrato was partitioned from Ronda and became an independent municipality in 2014 and is thus not included in the 2011 census.)		29.11	15.7/km^{2}
Sierra de Yeguas	3,457	3,522	−1.8%	85.57	40.4/km^{2}
Teba	3,703	4,116	−10.0%	143.74	25.8/km^{2}
Tolox	2,394	2,296	+4.3%	94.41	25.4/km^{2}
Torremolinos	70,920	66,270	+7.0%	19.91	3,562.0/km^{2}
Torrox	21,406	16,387	+30.6%	50.05	427.7/km^{2}
Totalán	778	738	+5.4%	9.20	84.6/km^{2}
Valle de Abdalajís	2,461	2,742	−10.2%	21.17	116.2/km^{2}
Vélez-Málaga	87,300	76,922	+13.5%	157.92	552.8/km^{2}
Villanueva de Algaidas	4,066	4,454	−8.7%	70.75	57.5/km^{2}
Villanueva de la Concepción	3,277	3,425	−4.3%	67.49	48.6/km^{2}
Villanueva de Tapia	1,393	1,628	−14.4%	21.63	64.4/km^{2}
Villanueva del Rosario	3,398	3,637	−6.6%	43.95	77.3/km^{2}
Villanueva del Trabuco	5,436	5,399	+0.7%	58.99	92.2/km^{2}
Viñuela	1,989	1,949	+2.1%	27.22	73.1/km^{2}
Yunquera	2,877	3,133	−8.2%	55.15	52.2/km^{2}
Province of Málaga	1,774,701	1,594,808	+11.3%	7,307.77	242.9/km^{2}
Andalusia	8,631,862	8,371,270	+3.1%	87,587.59	98.6/km^{2}
Spain	48,619,695	46,815,916	+3.9%	504,755.17	96.3/km^{2}

== See also ==
- Geography of Spain
- List of municipalities of Spain
