= Serrato =

- Municipality
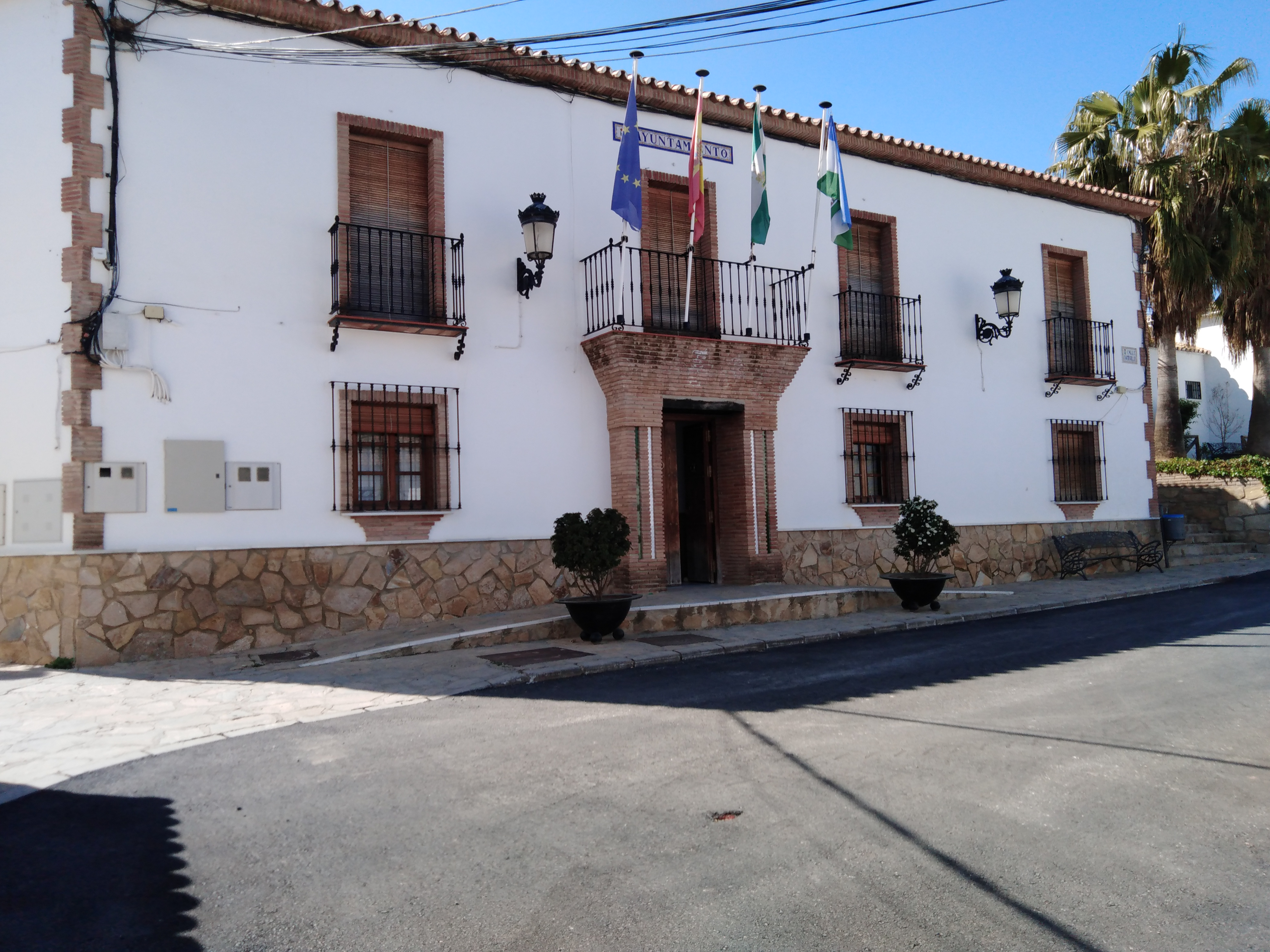

- Flag Coat of arms

- Municipal location in the Province of Málaga

- Location in Spain Serrato (Andalusia) Serrato (Spain)
- Coordinates: 36°53′18″N 4°58′28″W
- Country: Spain
- Community: Andalusia
- Province: Málaga
- Comarca: Guadalteba

Government
  - Mayor: Francisco López Arana (PSOE)

Area
  - Total: 29.19 km^{2} (11.27 sq mi)
- Elevation: 560 m (1,840 ft)

Population (2018)
  - Total: 477
  - Density: 16.3/km^{2} (42.3/sq mi)
- Demonym(s): Serrateño, -ña
- Time zone: UTC+1 (CET)
  - Summer (DST): UTC+2 (CEST)
- Postal code: 29471
- Website: www.serrato.es

Serrato is a town and municipality in the province of Málaga, part of the autonomous community of Andalusia in southern Spain. It was separated from the municipality of Ronda on 19 December 2014.

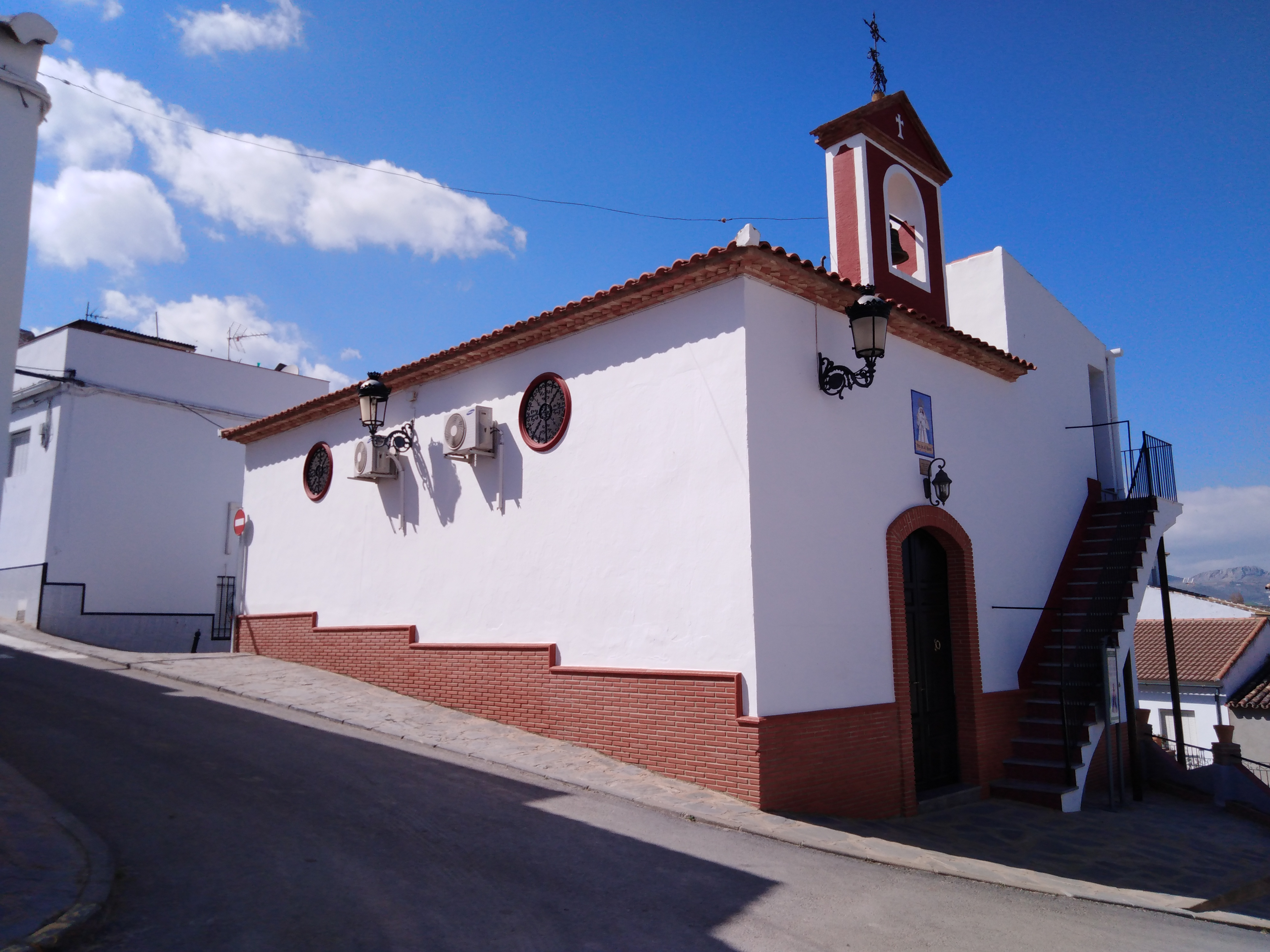
A church in Serrato

== See also ==
- List of municipalities in Málaga
