= Alfarnate =

- Municipality and town
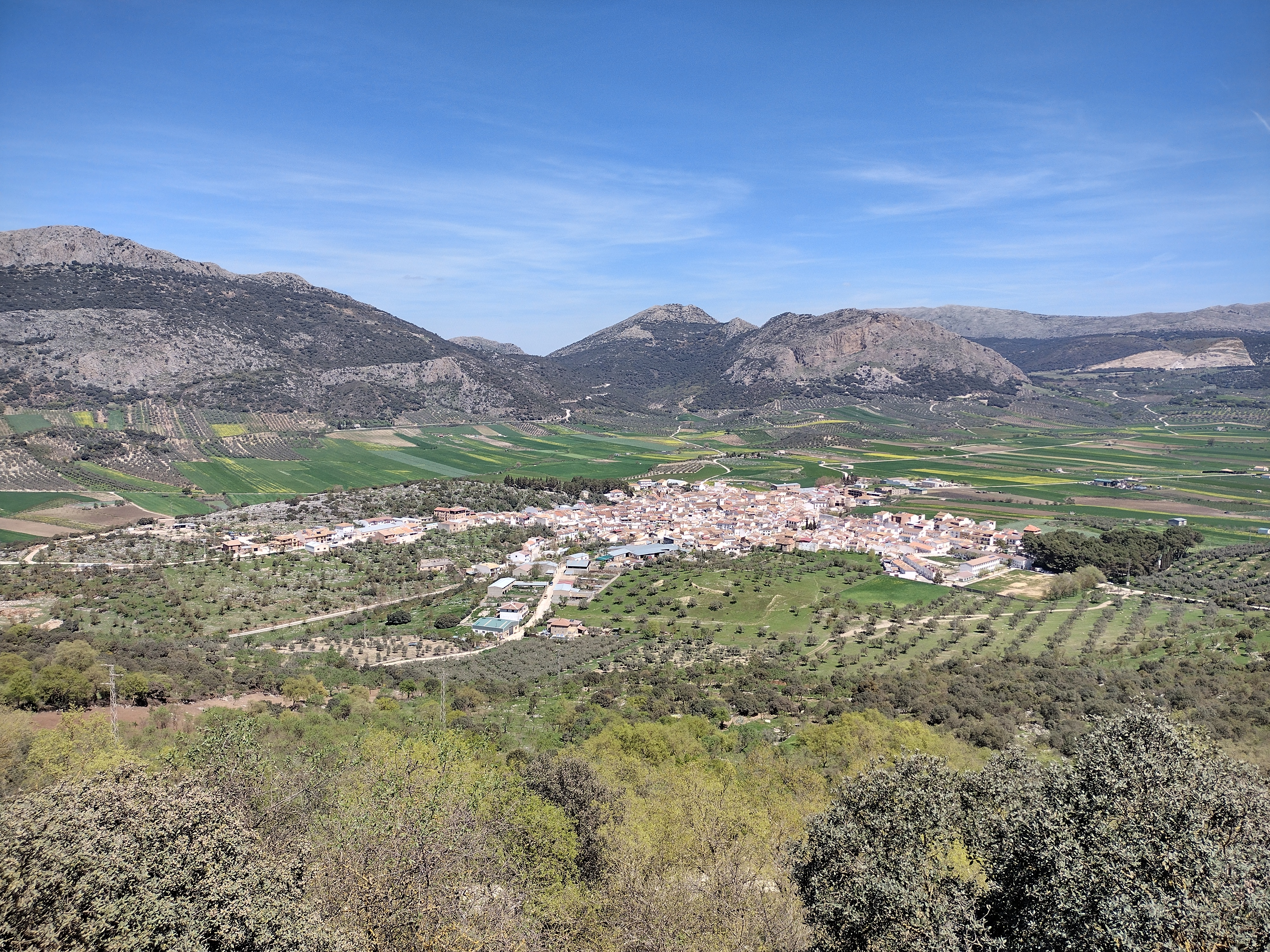

- Flag Coat of arms

- Municipal location in Málaga Province

- Location in Spain
- Coordinates: 36°59′N 4°15′W
- Sovereign state: Spain
- Autonomous community: Andalusia
- Province: Málaga
- Comarca: Axarquía - Costa del Sol

Area
  - Total: 13 sq mi (34 km^{2})
- Elevation: 3,035 ft (925 m)

Population (2025-01-01)
  - Total: 1,034
  - Density: 105.6/sq mi (40.76/km^{2})
- Time zone: UTC+1 (CET)
  - Summer (DST): UTC+2 (CEST)
- Website: http://www.alfarnate.es

Alfarnate is a small village located in the province of Málaga in Andalusia, Spain. It is situated in the comarca of Axarquía. As of 2005, it had a population of 1,398 inhabitants. The village sits at 928 meters above sea level. Alfarnatejo, a neighbouring village, is situated about 3.5 kilometers from Alfarnate.

== Topography ==
The town's name seems to come from the Arabic word Al-farnat, meaning flour mill. In fact, it now appears as a documented reference to Alfarnate in the tenth century as a zone of high production of flour. In the neighboring village of Alfarnatejo, two flour mills that operated with water from the stream can still be seen and give an idea of what this area was like at that time.

Alfarnate is usually characterized as a town of Axarquia, but actually it is a part of a border zone between Axarquia and the plain of Antequera. Along with Alfarnatejo, Colmenar and Casabermeja, Alfarnate is part of a sort of transition zone that has been called "Eastern Mountains of Málaga." Administratively it is often included within the Axarquia de Velez region, despite having almost nothing in common with the towns of Axarquía. Alfarnate currently belongs to the jurisdiction of the city of Málaga, a city with which it has almost all commercial relationships with as well as most of the transportation. Traditionally, Alfarnate has maintained most road contact with Malaga, Granada and the nearby city of Loja. It also has a history with nearby towns such as Zafarraya (quas-colonized with Alfarnate in the nineteenth century) and Villanueva del Trabuco.

== Geography ==
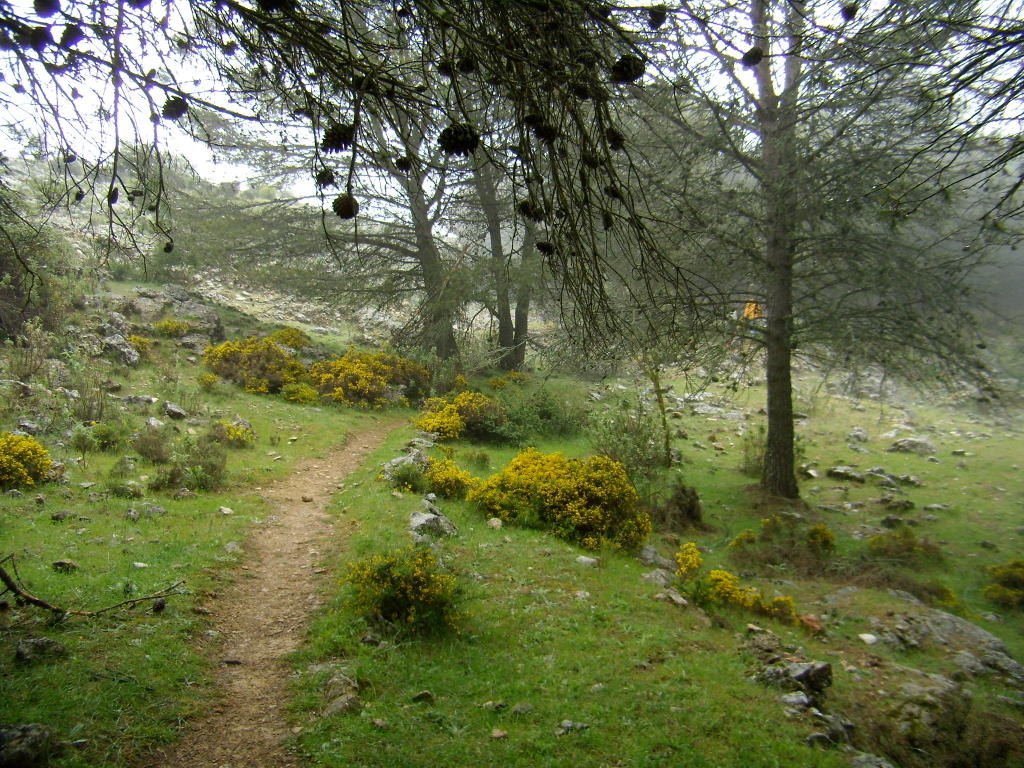
Pinewood in Alfarnate

It is located in the northern province, is the highest village (the streets are located at 925 meters above sea level) and its end is completely surrounded by mountains belonging to the geological movement of the Subbética. It has formations of dolomites and marls like the Sierra de Camarolos in the southwest, the Sierra del Jobo, whose peaks form the border for the west and northwest end, with the peak of Chamizo at 1,641 meters. The geographic north, also the port of Alazores, borders with the Sierra de Alhama that runs from north to southeast, with the formations of the Tajo de las Palomas (1,302 m), to meet at the Puerto del Sol (1,100 m) in the Sierra de Emmedio that defines the south with peaks like Vilo (1,415 m), Gallo (1,361 m) and Malinfierno Morrón that protect the town from the south (1,077 m). In the midst of these mountains of considerable height, Alfarnate has a valley of more than 900 meters making it one of the rarest examples of mountain villages in Andalusia.

=== Hydrography ===
Its rivers of water, streams of Palancar and Morales, the latter known as the stream of Juan Lorca, come together at the south of the town to form the river Sabar. It also has numerous springs like Barrionuevo, Castillejo and Ejido that nurtures the Villa.

== History ==
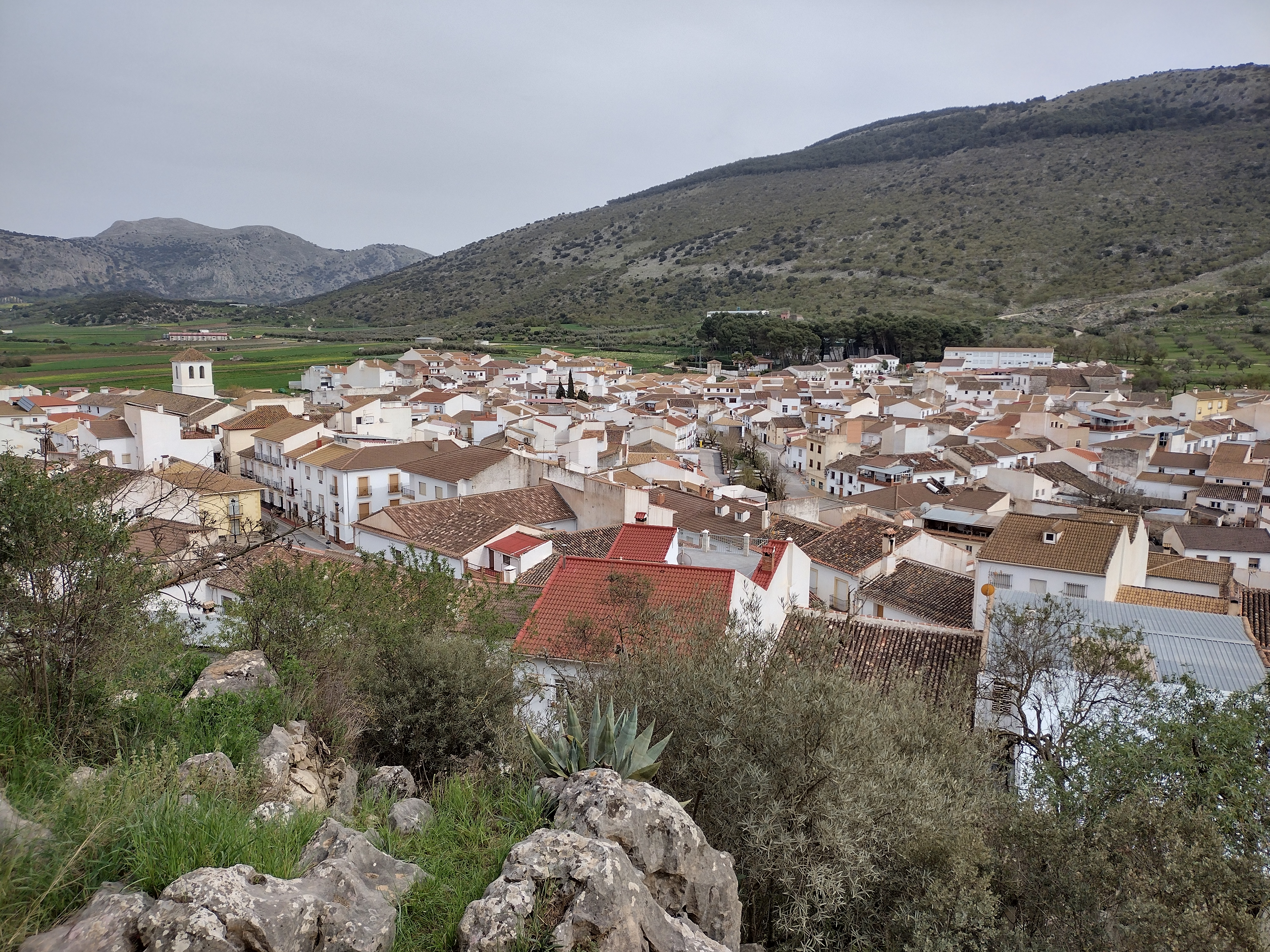
View of the village from the hill of Santo Cristo

The name is Alfarnate, like its younger brother Alfarnatejo, is a term originally formed from Arabic Al-farnat meaning flour mill. It can also identify with the old adjective "alfarnate" meaning rascal or scoundrel. Both the term and the current settlement Alfarnate were inhabited since prehistoric times by the first settlers of the region, as is evidenced by the remains found in the terraces of the Palancar and Morales streams, and at the confluence of both, where lies the village, dating back to the Mousterian period. As early as the Neolithic period, flint workshops are documented around the port of Alazores and the first traces of stable settlements would endure until historic times.

== See also ==
- List of municipalities in Málaga
