= The Smurfs (film) =

2011 film by Raja Gosnell

- Theatrical release poster
- Directed by: Raja Gosnell
- Screenplay by: J. David Stem; David N. Weiss; Jay Scherick; David Ronn
- Story by: J. David Stem; David N. Weiss
- Based on: The Smurfs by Peyo
- Produced by: Jordan Kerner
- Starring: Neil Patrick Harris; Jayma Mays; Sofía Vergara; Hank Azaria
- Cinematography: Phil Méheux
- Edited by: Sabrina Plisco
- Music by: Heitor Pereira
- Production companies: Columbia Pictures; Sony Pictures Animation; The Kerner Entertainment Company
- Distributed by: Sony Pictures Releasing
- Release dates: June 16, 2011 (Júzcar); July 29, 2011 (United States)
- Running time: 103 minutes
- Country: United States
- Language: English
- Budget: $110 million
- Box office: $564 million

The Smurfs is a 2011 American fantasy comedy film based on the comic book series created by Peyo. Directed by Raja Gosnell and written by J. David Stem, David N. Weiss, Jay Scherick, and David Ronn, from a story by Stem and Weiss, it is the first installment of the live-action animated Smurfs film series. The film stars Neil Patrick Harris, Jayma Mays, Sofía Vergara, and Hank Azaria, with the voices of Jonathan Winters, Katy Perry, George Lopez, Anton Yelchin, Fred Armisen, and Alan Cumming.

After five years of negotiations, Jordan Kerner bought the rights in 2002, and the film entered development with Paramount Pictures and Nickelodeon Movies, until Columbia Pictures and Sony Pictures Animation obtained the rights in 2008. On a production budget of $110 million, filming began in March 2010 in New York City.

The Smurfs premiered at Júzcar on June 16, 2011, and was released theatrically by Columbia Pictures through Sony Pictures Releasing in the United States on July 29. Despite receiving negative reviews from critics, it grossed $564 million worldwide and ranks as the ninth-highest-grossing film of 2011, and was Sony Pictures Animation's highest-grossing film until it was overtaken by Spider-Man: Across the Spider-Verse in 2023. It was also the highest-grossing live-action/animated hybrid of all time before it was overtaken by Lilo & Stitch in 2025. A sequel, The Smurfs 2, was released on July 31, 2013.

== Plot ==
In Smurf Village, the Smurfs are preparing for the Festival of the Blue Moon. Papa Smurf sees a vision of Clumsy Smurf reaching for a dragon wand and Gargamel capturing the Smurfs. Shortly after, Clumsy leaves to pick smurfroot and ends up leading Gargamel into the village. The Smurfs flee and Clumsy unknowingly runs toward the Forbidden Falls, with Papa, Smurfette, Grouchy, Brainy and Gutsy following him. The blue moon appears and creates a portal that spirits the Smurfs to New York City, and Gargamel and his pet cat Azrael follow them. Clumsy then falls into a box belonging to Anjelou Cosmetics employee Patrick Winslow, who unknowingly carries him to his apartment, where he lives with his pregnant wife Grace.

Papa, Smurfette, Brainy, Grouchy and Gutsy follow Clumsy, revealing themselves and explaining their situation to the Winslows, who give them shelter. The next day, needing to find a "stargazer", the Smurfs follow Patrick to his workplace at Anjelou, believing he is a fortune-teller. Meanwhile, Gargamel extracts Smurf essence from a lock of Smurfette's hair, which gives him magic powers. While searching for the Smurfs, he wanders into Anjelou and impresses Patrick's boss, Odile, by restoring her elderly mother's youth with his magic. Upon hearing of Patrick's connection to the Smurfs, Gargamel chases him and the Smurfs into FAO Schwarz, where he steals a leaf blower and causes chaos while trying to catch the Smurfs. He is arrested and jailed, but manages to escape with the aid of a swarm of flies.

Papa uses a toy telescope to calculate the night he and the others can return home, but needs to work out a spell first. The Smurfs visit an antique store to look for a spellbook and find L’Histoire des Schtroumpfs by researcher Peyo, which contains a spell that can turn the moon blue. Gargamel tracks them down in the store, where he finds the dragon wand from Papa's vision and transfers his magic into it to use it against the Smurfs. Papa entrusts the spell to Brainy and voluntarily stays behind to be captured by Gargamel.

After Clumsy convinces the others to rescue Papa, the Smurfs and Patrick travel to Belvedere Castle at Central Park, where Gargamel increases his wand's power with Papa's essence. Brainy successfully turns the moon blue and opens a portal to their world, from where he summons all the Smurfs of Smurf Village. While the Smurfs battle Gargamel, Smurfette and Patrick save Papa. Gutsy steals the dragon wand, but drops it in the process. Clumsy catches it and sends Gargamel flying away. The Smurfs bid Patrick and Grace farewell and return to Smurf Village.

Later, Patrick and Grace have a baby boy, whom they name Blue, and the Smurfs rebuild their village in the style of New York.

== Cast ==
- Hank Azaria as Gargamel, the arch-nemesis of the Smurfs who plots to use the Smurfs as part of a spell that would turn lead into gold. As opposed to the television show where Gargamel's goal is to use the Smurfs as the key ingredient in an alchemical formula to create the gold or eat them or destroy them, in the film he wants to capture them to serve as charms, "whose mystical essence will make his inept magic more powerful — and dangerous". To look the part of Gargamel, Azaria wore a prosthetic nose, ears, buck teeth, eyebrows, and a wig (to make the process easier, he shaved his head). The initial make-up test took three hours, but by mid-production, the process took 90 minutes to complete. Azaria was transformed over 50 times and spent approximately 130 hours in the make-up chair.
- Jonathan Winters as Papa Smurf, the leader of the Smurfs. Winters previously provided the voice of Grandpa Smurf in the 1980s cartoon series. Winters and Frank Welker are the only original cast members from the TV series who returned for the film.
- Katy Perry as Smurfette, the only female Smurf. About gaining the voice role, Perry said: "They had done a blind test where they took certain voices from previous interviews and matched them with the character. They liked my voice without even knowing who it was, and when they found out it was me, they thought that would work out. My personality was just a plus!"
- Anton Yelchin as Clumsy Smurf, the accident-prone, but friendly smurf. Yelchin commented on his character's personality change from the cartoon series saying, "I was familiar with Clumsy from the TV series, where he had that Southern twang. I went back and watched that, and then Raja, Jordan and I talked about it. We decided to make Clumsy a little simpler, a little sweeter. His voice is pitched higher than my normal speaking voice – it's full of joy, optimism, and enthusiasm for life. Clumsy isn't trying to mess anything up for anybody — he's just clumsy, and actually, he's tired of being clumsy".
- Neil Patrick Harris as Patrick Winslow, the new VP of marketing at Anjelou Cosmetics and Grace's husband.
- Jayma Mays as Grace Winslow, Patrick's wife.
- Fred Armisen as Brainy Smurf, the second smartest Smurf behind Papa Smurf. Quentin Tarantino was up to voice him, but dropped out.
- George Lopez as Grouchy Smurf, a smurf who is always grouchy. To prepare for his role of being "grouchy", Lopez did not drink coffee, made sure he had bad breath and picked the busiest time to get to the studio.
- Alan Cumming as Gutsy Smurf, one of three Smurfs created specifically for the film and who is Scottish, wears a kilt and has sideburns. The character is also described as the "action-hero" of the film.
- Sofía Vergara as Odile Anjelou, the CEO of Anjelou Cosmetics and Patrick's boss.
- Jeff Foxworthy as Handy Smurf, a hard-working smurf.
- Paul Reubens as Jokey Smurf, a smurf who plays pranks on others.
- Gary Basaraba as Hefty Smurf, a strong smurf with a tattoo of a heart.
- John Oliver as Vanity Smurf, a smurf who is obsessed with his looks.
- Kenan Thompson as Greedy Smurf, a smurf who loves smurfberries.
- B. J. Novak as Baker Smurf, a smurf who loves to bake.
- Joel McCrary as Farmer Smurf, a smurf who is a farmer.
- Wolfgang Puck as Chef Smurf, a smurf who loves to cook.
- John Kassir as Crazy Smurf, the alarm for the village and the second Smurf created specifically for the film
- Tom Kane as Narrator Smurf, a smurf with a deep narrator voice and the third Smurf created specifically for the film.
- Frank Welker as Azrael, Gargamel's cat. Welker provided the voice of Hefty Smurf and other characters in the 1980s cartoon series. Four orange tabby cats played the role of Azrael with some scenes being created with CGI by Tippett Studio. Animal trainer Larry Madrid had a "rare Burma cat" that was used to elicit snarls from the other cats since they did not like him.
- Tim Gunn as Henri, Odile's assistant at Anjelou Cosmetics.

Joan Rivers, Liz Smith, Tom Colicchio, Olivia Palermo, and Michael Musto make cameos in the film at a fictional Anjelou cosmetics product launch.

== Production ==
=== Development ===
In 1997, producer Jordan Kerner sent the first "of a series of letters" to The Smurfs' licensing agent Lafig Belgium expressing interest in making a feature film. It was not until 2002 after a draft of Kerner's film adaptation of Charlotte's Web was read by Peyo's heirs, that they accepted Kerner's offer. Peyo's daughter Véronique Culliford and family had wanted to make a Smurfs film for years and said that Kerner was the first person to pitch a film that shared their "vision and enthusiasm". Kerner soon began developing the 3-D CGI feature film with Paramount Pictures and Nickelodeon Movies. In 2006, Kerner said the film was planned to be a trilogy and would explain more of Gargamel's backstory. He stated, "We'll learn [more] about Gargamel and Smurf Soup and how all that began and what really goes on in that castle. What his backstory really was. There's an all-powerful wizard... there's all sorts of things that get revealed as we go along". Early animation footage was leaked on the internet in early 2008. The filmmakers were allowed to create three new Smurfs for the film – Narrator, Crazy, and Gutsy.

In June 2008, it was announced that Columbia Pictures and Sony Pictures Animation obtained the film rights from Lafig Belgium. Kerner said the current project started with Sony during a conversation with the chairman-CEO Michael Lynton, who grew up watching The Smurfs in the Netherlands. Kerner explained, "He relished them as I do and suggested that it should be a live-action/CGI film. Amy Pascal felt equally that there was potentially a series of films in the making". J. David Stem and David N. Weiss, writers of Shrek 2, Jimmy Neutron: Boy Genius, The Rugrats Movie and Rugrats in Paris: The Movie wrote the screenplay along with Zookeeper writers Jay Scherick and David Ronn; Stem and Weiss also wrote the story. Raja Gosnell, who previously directed Scooby-Doo and its sequel Monsters Unleashed, directed the film. Quentin Tarantino was in talks to play Brainy Smurf, however, these did not pan out.

=== Filming and animation ===
On a budget of $110 million, principal photography began in New York City on March 26, 2010. In May, scenes were shot all night for five nights in a row at F.A.O. Schwartz toy store. Other locations used for filming were Belvedere Castle, the Russian Tea Room, Rockefeller Center, and Brooklyn's Prospect Park. A two-thirds-scale replica of the Belvedere Castle was built with wooden grates as floors (to create additional contrast). Gargamel's dungeon under the Belvedere Castle, which included the "Smurfalator", was built on a soundstage. It took three months to build because some parts were hard to come by. Production eventually found the rare parts at garage sales, flea markets, on eBay and Craigslist. The scene where Gargamel escapes from prison was filmed at the Nassau County Correctional Center in East Meadow.

In order to help the Smurfs' animators during post-production, cinematographer Phil Meheux and his team would light up a scene where the Smurfs would be digitally added using 7 and one half-inch tall models to stand in during set-up and rehearsals. He explained, "We can then position the light so that it falls right. The actors know where the Smurf will be when it is animated later, so their eyelines will match. Then we can take out the model and shoot the scene, and they look quite real, fitting the real backing that we're giving them. It looks like they're part of the surroundings". Also during the process the Imageworks visual effects team used a new camera system to precisely record the on-set lighting, so it could be applied later in the computer. When time came to film a scene that would include actors and Smurfs, each Smurf was represented by a different colored dot and the actors had to remember which dot was which Smurf. The Smurfs characters were created during post-production by 268 Sony Pictures Imageworks employees who spent around 358,000 hours animating. Character designer Allen Battino, a long time Kerner collaborator, was brought in to redesign the characters for CGI.

== Marketing ==
Smurfette wearing Marc Jacobs

=== Harper's Bazaar ===
Using a 'cross-promotional' marketing tactic, fashion journalist Laura Brown and CGI graphics supervisor J.J. Blumenkranz collaborated on the fall accessories spread of the August 2011 edition of the Harper Bazaar. This was chosen with the model of Smurfette of whom was styled with accessories from designer fashion brands including Dolce & Gabbana, Louis Vuitton, Marc Jacobs and Lanvin. The section titled: 'Smurfette Style: Accessories That Pop', stated that instead of 'feeling blue' costumers should 'make like Smurfette and step out in the hottest fall accessories.' Photography was completed by Jeffrey Westbrook. With the publishing of the digital article, a link to see an exclusive preview was provided.

== Release ==
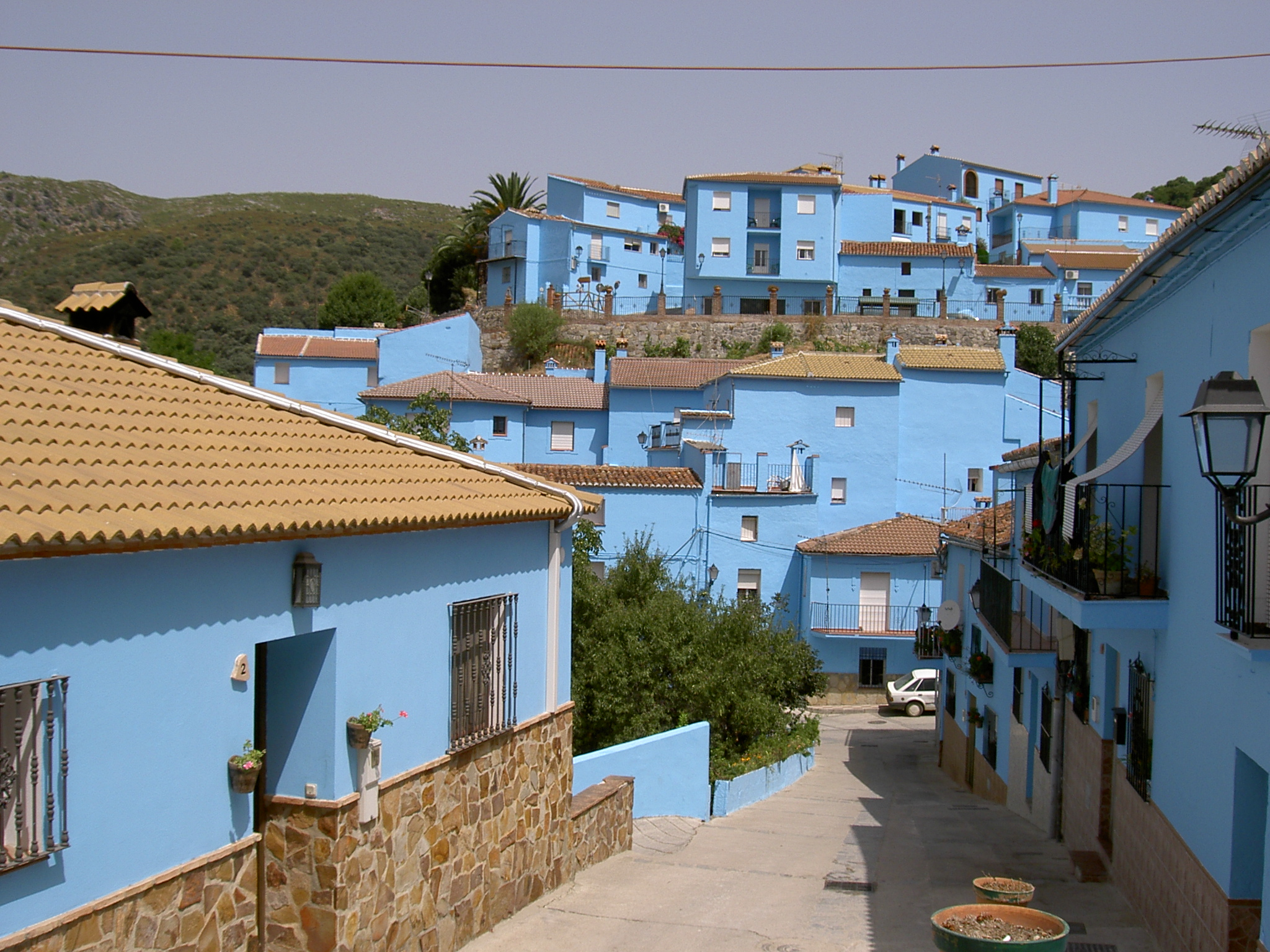
For the world premiere of The Smurfs, Júzcar residents painted their entire village in blue

The film had its worldwide premiere on June 16, 2011, in Júzcar, a small village in Spain. To celebrate the release, the residents painted the entire village, including the church and other historical buildings, in blue. Twelve local painters used 4,000 litres of blue to transform the traditionally white Júzcar into the world's first Smurf Village. Although Sony vowed to restore the village to its former look, six months after the premiere, the residents voted to keep the colour, which had brought more than 80,000 tourists to Júzcar.

The Japanese version of the film uses Hey! Say! JUMP's "Magic Power" as its theme song. A couple of the singers were voice actors in the Japanese dub.

In the United States, the film was meant to be released on December 17, 2010, but it was delayed to July 29, 2011. It was then further delayed to August 3, 2011, before being moved up to the original release date of July 29, 2011. Sony teamed up with marketing partners in the United States, Canada, and the United Kingdom to promote the film through McDonald's Happy Meals and Post Foods brand cereal during the summer of 2011.

=== Home media ===
The Smurfs was released on DVD, Blu-ray, and Blu-ray 3D on December 2, 2011, by Sony Pictures Home Entertainment, which is accompanied with a new 22-minute animated short film, The Smurfs: A Christmas Carol. The Smurfs and Friends with Benefits are the first Sony films compatible with the UltraViolet system, which enables users to access films on any web-connected device. The film was re-released on Ultra HD Blu-ray on March 28, 2017.

In April 2021, Sony signed a deal giving Disney access to their legacy content to stream on Disney+ and Hulu and appear on Disney's linear television networks. Disney's access to Sony's titles would come following their availability on Netflix.

== Reception ==
=== Box office ===
The Smurfs grossed $142.6 million in the United States and Canada, along with $421.1 million in foreign markets, for a worldwide total of $563.7 million. It was the ninth-highest-grossing film of 2011. Documents from the Sony Pictures hack revealed the film turned a profit of $83 million. It was Sony Pictures Animation's highest-grossing film until it was surpassed by Spider-Man: Across the Spider-Verse in 2023.

The film opened on approximately 5,300 screens at 3,395 locations, with 2,042 locations being 3D-enabled theaters. On July 28, 2011, Exhibitor Relations predicted The Smurfs would rank third its opening weekend with $24 million, but analyst Jeff Bock added that the film "could be a dark horse and do better than expected". That same day, John Young of Entertainment Weekly predicted a $32 million opening and a second-place ranking behind Cowboys & Aliens. He also stated that the ticket service Fandango reported that the film was leading in ticket sales. The Smurfs came in number one on Friday making $13.2 million, ahead of Cowboys & Aliens' $13 million. According to Sony's research, 65% of The Smurfs' audience was parents (40%) and their children under 12 years old (25%). Overall, the audience breakdown was reported as 64% female and 55% age 25 years and older.

Estimates later showed that Cowboys & Aliens and The Smurfs were tied at the number one spot for the weekend with $36.2 million each. However, actual figures showed Cowboys & Aliens won the weekend with $36.4 million just beating The Smurfs' $35.6 million. The Smurfs' opening was still stronger than anticipated since some box office analysts predicted that it would open below $30 million. For its second weekend the film remained at number two with Rise of the Planet of the Apes taking Cowboys & Aliens' spot. It made $20.7 million (41% being from 3D showings), a 42% decrease from its opening weekend.

The Smurfs opened to $4.4 million from seven territories with Spain taking in $4 million of that total. On its second weekend it expanded to 42 territories, taking first place in most of its markets and grossing $45.2 million. Among the markets the film opened in first place were Brazil ($6.65 million), France ($5.93 million), Mexico ($5.53 million) Germany ($5.43 million). The film stayed number one at the international box office for the next seven weeks.

=== Critical reception ===
Review aggregator Rotten Tomatoes reports that 21% of 119 critics have given the film a positive review, with a rating average of 4/10. The site's critical consensus states, "The Smurfs assembles an undeniably talented cast of voice actors and live-action stars—then crushes them beneath a blue mound of lowest-common-denominator kiddie fare." Metacritic, which assigns a weighted average score out of 100 to reviews from mainstream critics, gave the film an average score of 30 based on 22 reviews, which indicates "generally unfavorable reviews". Audiences polled by CinemaScore gave the film an average grade of "A−" on an A+ to F scale.

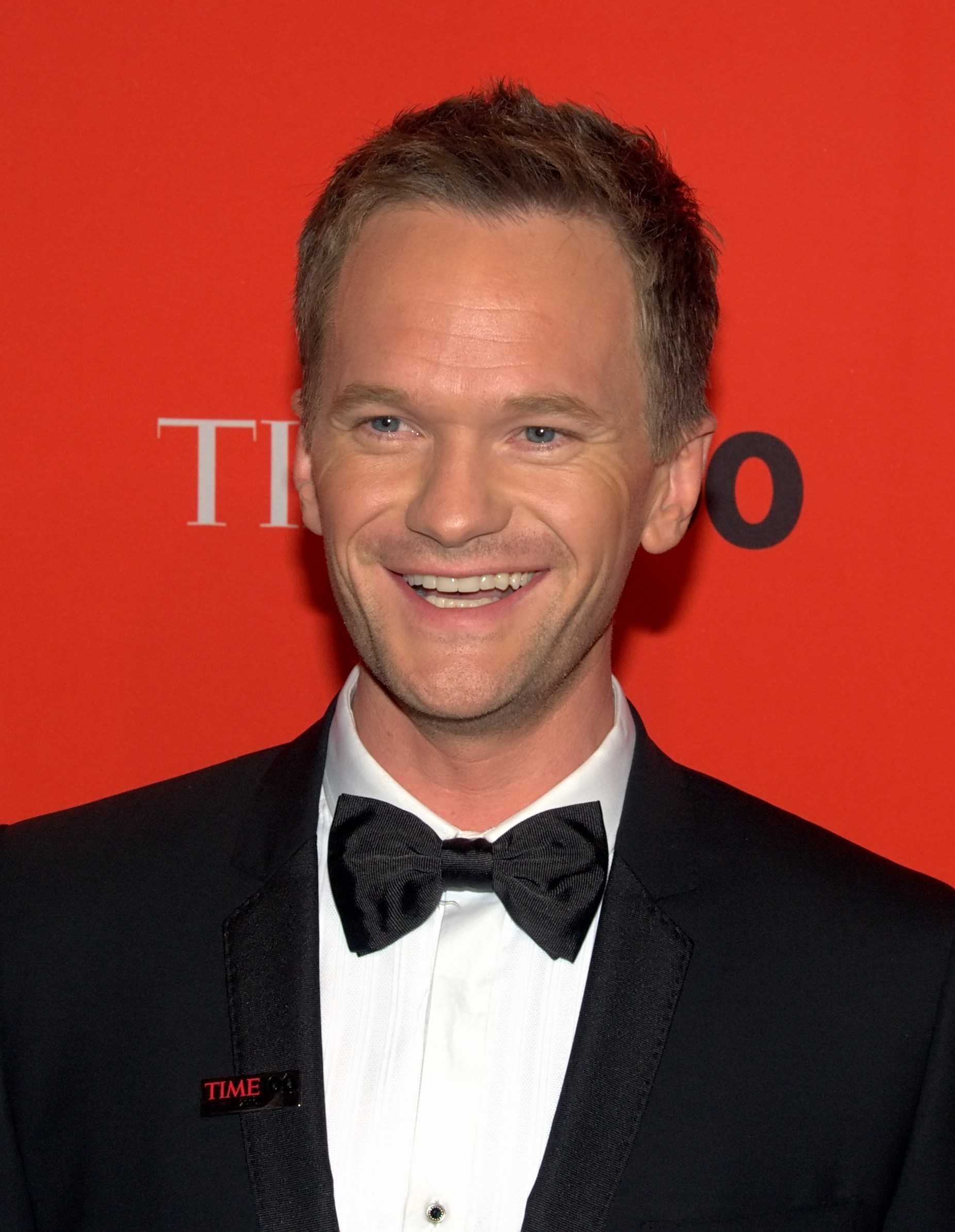
Despite negative reviews, Neil Patrick Harris was praised for his performance.

Keith Staskiewicz of Entertainment Weekly gave the film a D+ saying, "The Smurfs may be blue, but their movie is decidedly green, recycling discarded bits from other celluloid Happy Meals like Alvin and the Chipmunks, Garfield, and Hop into something half animated, half live action, and all careful studio calculation". Michael Rechtshaffen of The Hollywood Reporter gave the film a negative review saying, "This numbingly generic Smurf-out-of-water-tale is strictly for those who stand closer to three apples tall." Ending the review he said, "Having previously helmed two Scooby-Doos and a Beverly Hills Chihuahua, director Raja Gosnell could probably have done this one in his sleep, which is likely where all but the most attentive of caregivers will helplessly find themselves drifting."

Roger Moore of the Orlando Sentinel gave it two out of four stars saying, "The good news about the big-screen 3D version of The Smurfs that's opening at your neighborhood multiplex is that it's not the insipid and some say "socialist" Smurfs you remember from 1980s TV". He called the slapstick "very small-kid friendly" and considered the adult-friendly jokes "pretty mild stuff". He closed his review saying, "Yeah, the Smurfs are still sickeningly sweet and upbeat. But if you've got kids, it's not nearly as torturous to sit through as you might have feared". Justin Chang of Variety described the film as "adorable and annoying, patently unnecessary yet kinda sweet" and calling it "a calculated commercial enterprise with little soul but an appreciable amount of heart". He said, "The script does wink knowingly in the direction of attentive adults".

San Francisco Chronicle's Peter Hartlaub gave the film a mixed review. He said The Smurfs is a "rare movie where the worst parts are in the promos". He called Harris' performance an "honest effort in a thankless role" but said that Azaria as Gargamel "Hidden under prosthetics, [Hank Azaria] compensates for his lack of good lines and repulsive makeup by overacting". He closed his review saying, "Harris, mostly acting against Marshmallow Peep-sized animated creations, is convincing and likable throughout. No doubt he will poke fun at his participation in this film the next time he's hosting an awards show, but don't be fooled. It takes a good actor to save a bad movie". Ty Burr of The Boston Globe criticized the CGI used on the cat, the use of 3D by calling it "needless" and Lopez's voice as Grouchy. He called the Smurf rap the worst part of the film. However, Burr echoed Harlaub's praise for Harris' performance by saying, "Harris manages to class up whatever he touches, even if the sight of him repeatedly hitting himself with an umbrella probably won't go on the career highlight reel". About Azaria, he said, "[Azaria] gets to put on a baldy wig and fake buck-teeth and overact as broadly as he can. A little of this goes a long way unless you're 6 years old, which is the point". He also added that Sofia Vergara "shares the screenplay's confusion as to what, exactly, she's doing here".

USA Today's Scott Bowles enjoyed Azaria's performance calling him "the human standout" and saying "He and his distrusting cat, Azrael, steal scenes". He also called Jonathan Winters "wonderful" as Papa Smurf. Neil Genzlinger of The New York Times said Azaria was "quite funny". About the film's content, he said "Those grown-up winks, along with an array of New York locations, make The Smurfs a surprisingly tolerable film for adults. As for their children, well, who knows with kids? But at least the writers have cleverly built in enough Smurfology that today's youngsters will be able to get the basics of the blue universe". Betsy Sharkey from the Los Angeles Times gave the film a negative review saying, "Director Raja Gosnell starts with the innocence but then loses his way in trying to pull off the hipster spin the script by J. David Stem, David N. Weiss, Jay Scherick and David Ronn is shooting for." and "There are many good actors wasted as voices—Alan Cumming, Fred Armisen and Winters among them—and in the flesh, though the greatest disservice is to Azaria".

=== Accolades ===
NewNowNext Awards

- Next Must See Movie (Nominated)

38th People's Choice Awards

- Favorite Animated Movie Voice: Katy Perry (Nominated)

2012 Kids' Choice Awards

- Favorite Movie (Nominated)
- Favorite Movie Actress: Sofia Vergara (Nominated)
- Favorite Voice in an Animated Film: Katy Perry (Won)

== Video games ==
- The Smurfs, a Nintendo DS video game was released on July 19, 2011.
- The Smurfs Dance Party, a Wii video game was released on July 19, 2011.

== Sequels ==
=== The Smurfs 2 ===
A sequel, titled The Smurfs 2, was released on July 31, 2013. Director Raja Gosnell and producer Jordan Kerner returned, along with all the main cast. New cast includes Christina Ricci, J. B. Smoove, and Brendan Gleeson. In the sequel, Gargamel creates a couple of evil Smurf-like creatures called the Naughties to harness the magical Smurf-essence. When he discovers that only a real Smurf can give him what he wants and that only Smurfette can turn the Naughties into the real Smurfs, Gargamel kidnaps Smurfette and takes her to Paris. Papa, Clumsy, Grouchy, and Vanity return to the human world and seek the help of their friends Patrick and Grace Winslow to rescue Smurfette from Gargamel. Like its predecessor, The Smurfs 2 was met with critically negative reviews, and grossing $347 million worldwide against a $105 million budget.

=== Cancelled third film and revivals ===
On May 10, 2012, two weeks after Columbia Pictures and Sony Pictures Animation announced production of The Smurfs 2, Variety reported that writers Karey Kirkpatrick and Chris Poche were developing a script for The Smurfs 3, which was set for release on July 24, 2015, and later rescheduled for August 14, 2015. In March 2014, Sony announced that it will reboot the series with a completely computer-animated film. Directed by Kelly Asbury, the first reboot titled Smurfs: The Lost Village, was released on April 7, 2017, which received mixed reviews from critics, but was considered an improvement over the live-action films. On February 7, 2022, it was reported that LAFIG Belgium and IMPS (now known as Peyo Company), the owners of the Smurfs brand, had agreed to a partnership with Paramount Animation and Nickelodeon Movies to produce multiple animated Smurfs films, with the second reboot being an animated musical film. Pam Brady is set to write the screenplay, with production set to begin later that year for a release on December 20, 2024. On June 14, 2022, it was announced that former DreamWorks Animation veteran Chris Miller would direct the musical film. In August, it was delayed to February 14, 2025, with Sonic the Hedgehog 3 taking its previous release date. On April 27, 2023, at CinemaCon, it was announced that Barbadian singer Rihanna would be voicing Smurfette, as well as producing the film along with writing and recording original songs for the movie. The title was reported to be The Smurfs Movie. Later, it was renamed as The Smurfs Musical. The title was officially revealed as The Smurfs Movie during CinemaCon in April 2024, alongside Nick Offerman, Natasha Lyonne, JP Karliak, Dan Levy, Amy Sedaris, Nick Kroll, James Corden, Octavia Spencer, Hannah Waddingham, Sandra Oh, Alex Winter, Billie Lourd, Xolo Maridueña, Kurt Russell, and John Goodman joining the voice cast. On October 4, 2024, the film's release date was delayed to July 18, 2025.

== Bibliography ==
- Cendrowicz, Leo (January 15, 2008). "The Smurfs Are Off to Conquer the World — Again". Time. Time Inc. Archived from the original on October 16, 2011.
- Lichfield, John (2008). Happy Smurfday to the elves you love or hate. Vol. 6872. Independent News & Media Limited. p. 27.
