= Riogordo =

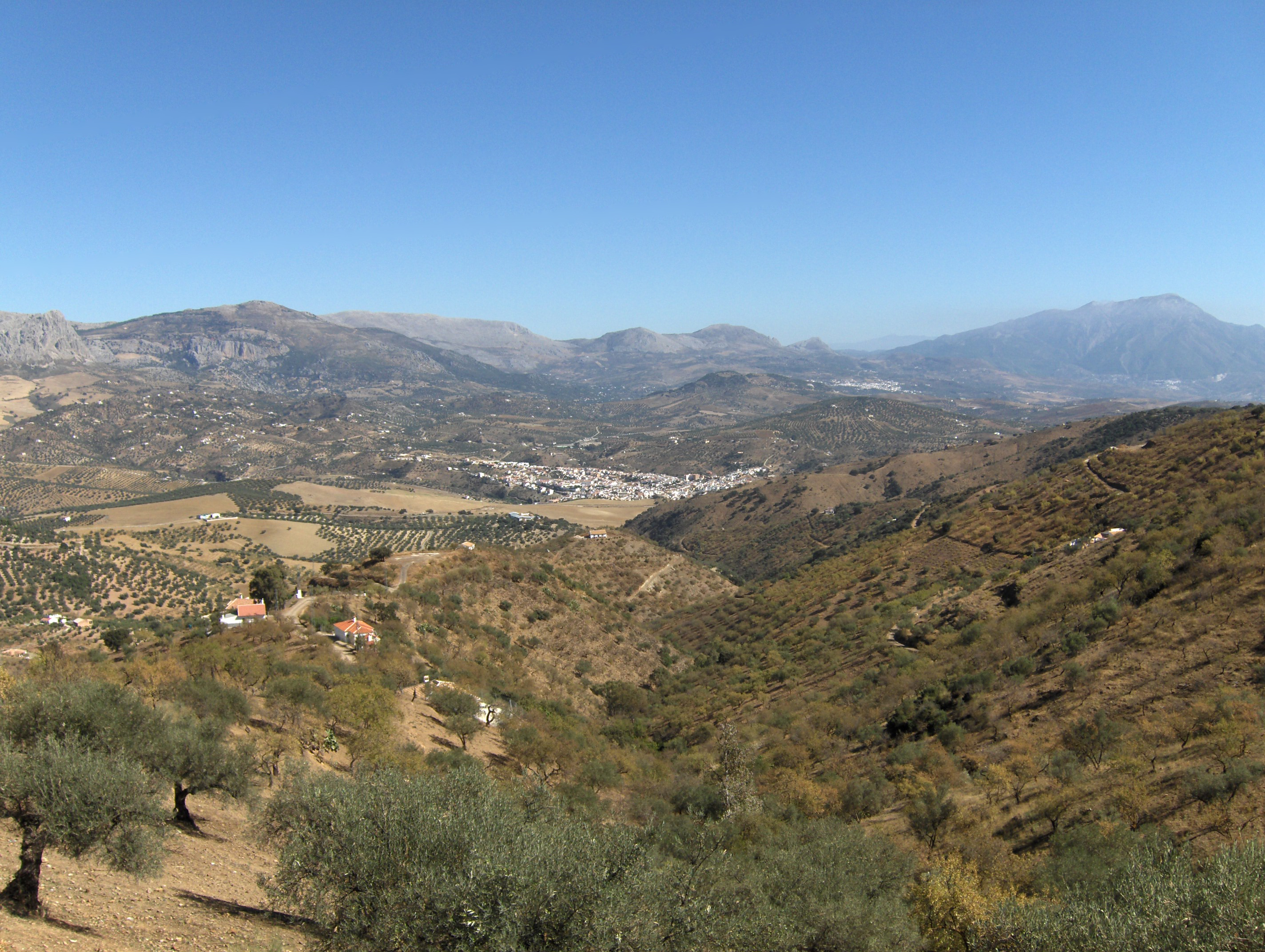
- View of Riogordo from Colmenar

- Flag Coat of arms

- Location in Spain
- Coordinates: 36°55′N 4°18′W
- Sovereign state: Spain
- Autonomous community: Andalusia
- Province: Málaga

Area
  - Total: 41 km^{2} (16 sq mi)
- Elevation: 405 m (1,329 ft)

Population (2025-01-01)
  - Total: 2,839
  - Density: 69/km^{2} (180/sq mi)
- Time zone: UTC+1 (CET)
  - Summer (DST): UTC+2 (CEST)
- Website: www.riogordo.es

Riogordo is a small town and municipality of around 3,000 inhabitants in the province of Málaga in the autonomous community of Andalusia in southern Spain. It is situated in the centre of the comarca of Axarquía that runs east and inland of Málaga as far as Nerja. It is located about 40 kilometres (25 mi) from Málaga and 30 km (19 mi) from Vélez-Málaga. Nestled in the low-lying mountains (between the Montes de Málaga and the higher sierras), it is almost one of the classic Andalusian "white villages". It is equidistant between Málaga and Vélez-Málaga, both of which are little more than 30 minutes by car.

The town hosts the "El Paso" festival at Easter (Semana Santa), a reenactment of the crucifixion which has a cast of hundreds, mostly local villagers.

== See also ==
- List of municipalities in Málaga
