= Cútar manuscripts =

Group of documents from Islamic Spain

The Cútar manuscripts (in Spanish, Los manuscritos de Cútar) refer to three documents from Islamic Spain that were discovered in 2003 in the village of Cútar in the province of Malaga. The documents, including a copy of the Quran and two other books, had lain hidden behind the wall of an old house for more than 500 years. Subsequent research revealed that the books had been left there by Muhammad Al-Ŷayyār, a jurist (alfaqui) and imam in the then-village of Aquta, around the year 1500.

Al-Ŷayyār had arrived in Cutar in 1490. After the Catholic reconquest of Spain, he was faced with the choice of conversion or exile. Choosing the latter, and in the hope of returning one day, he decided to secrete the books behind the wall. The books were never recovered by him. They were finally discovered by accident on June 28, 2003, when workers were renovating the house of its current owner Magdalena Santiago, who alerted the authorities.

The books were restored and are now kept at the Archivo Histórico Provincial de Málaga. The Quran, which is square in shape, has been dated back to the Almohad period, either the 12th or 13th century, making it one of the two oldest Qurans in Spain. The two other documents were written mainly by Al-Ŷayyār, and contain details of his work as alfaqui (jurist) of the village, and his accounts of contemporary events such as the fall of Granada in 1492 and the Malaga earthquake of 1494. Facsimiles of the books are also kept at the Monfi museum in Cutar.
