= Júzcar =

- Municipality
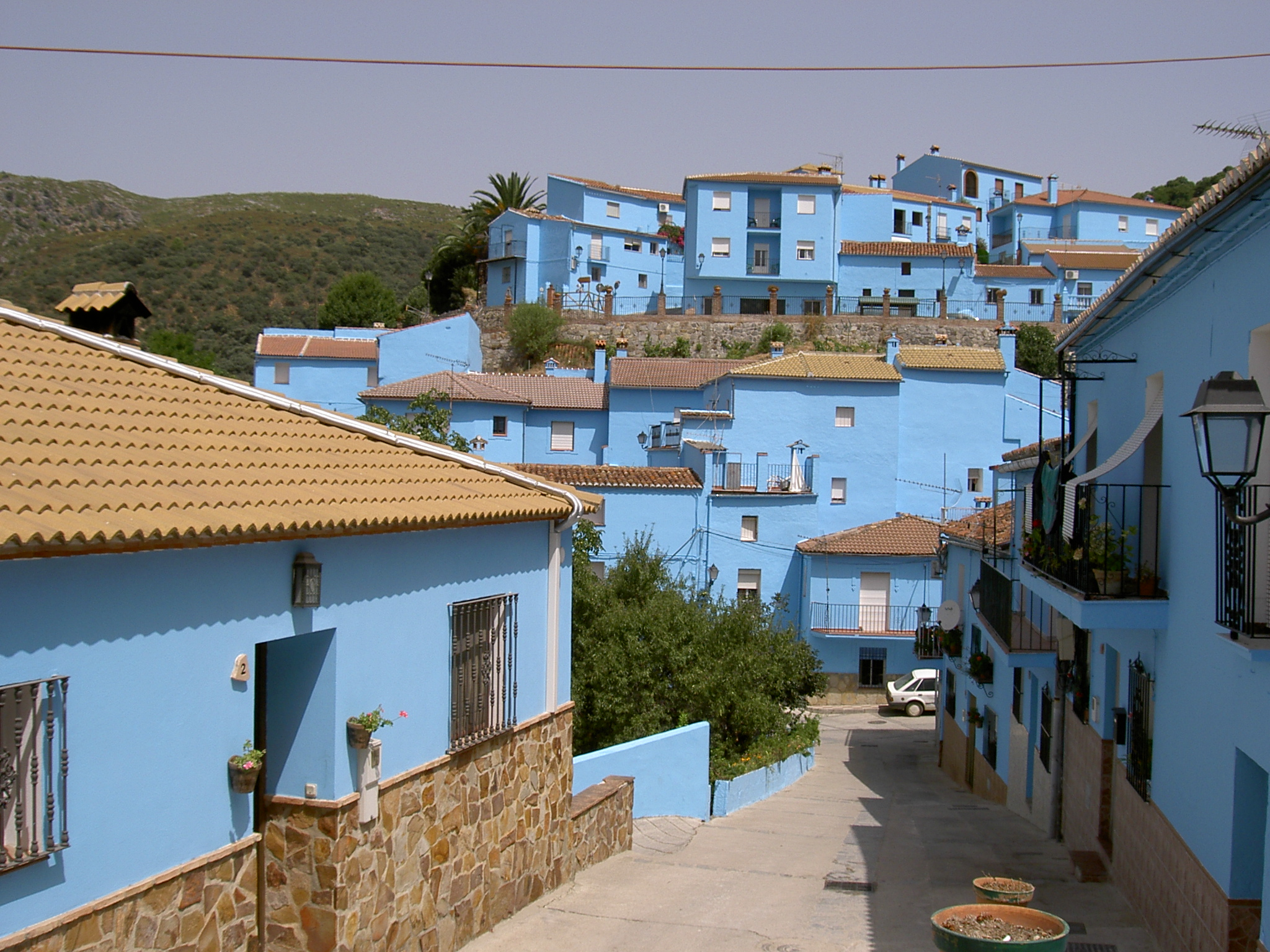
- View of Júzcar for the worldwide premiere of The Smurfs.

- Flag Coat of arms

- Location within Spain
- Coordinates: 36°37′32.0″N 5°10′15.1″W
- Country: Spain
- A. community: Andalucía
- Province: Málaga

Government
  - Mayor: Francisco Lozano

Area
  - Total: 33.66 km^{2} (13.00 sq mi)
- Elevation: 600 m (2,000 ft)

Population (January 1, 2021)
  - Total: 240
  - Density: 7.13/km^{2} (18.5/sq mi)
- Demonym: Juzcareño/a
- Time zone: UTC+01:00
- Postal code(s): 29462
- MCN: 29065
- Website: Official website

Júzcar (Spanish pronunciation: [ˈxuθkaɾ]) is a village and municipality in the province of Málaga, part of the autonomous community of Andalusia in southern Spain. It is situated in the east of province in the Valle del Genal. The municipality is situated approximately 22 kilometres from Ronda and 113 from the provincial capital of Málaga. It belongs to the comarca of Serranía de Ronda.

The village had been one of the White Villages of Andalusia, with buildings traditionally whitewashed. In spring 2011, buildings in the village (including the church) were painted blue by Sony España to celebrate the premiere of The Smurfs movie. Approximately 4,000 litres (880 imp gal; 1,100 US gal) of paint were used. While the original agreement with Sony España included painting the village white after its promotion ended, in December 2011 the village hall organised a special referendum vote for the village residents to determine whether the village would remain blue or revert to white; the referendum results indicated the village would continue as blue with no date for reverting to white. The vote came after an estimated 95,000 tourists visited the village in the six months following the blue paint job, while the village had previously seen about 9,000 tourists annually.

As of December 2020, Júzcar remains, more or less, a blue village. While the Smurf name has been left in the past, the village is still commonly known by Spaniards as the Smurf Village. However, for tourism, the village is officially referred to as "La Aldea Azul", the blue village. The village was last painted blue in 2019, with paint provided by the provincial and village governments, and building owners responsible for the actual painting.

One of the highlights of the region surrounding Júzcar is the "Bosque de Cobre" or "Copper Forest". This picturesque area, located along the road connecting Júzcar with Pujerra and Igualeja, offers stunning panoramic views, especially during autumn when the chestnut trees turn a vibrant copper colour.

== Climate ==
Climate data for Júzcar
Month	Jan	Feb	Mar	Apr	May	Jun	Jul	Aug	Sep	Oct	Nov	Dec	Year
Mean daily maximum °C	16	17	19	20	23	26	28	29	26	22	19	17	22
Daily mean °C	10	9	11	13	15	24	24	24	21	18	13	11	16
Mean daily minimum °C	11	12	13	14	16	18	20	21	19	17	14	12	16
Average precipitation mm	—	—	—	—	—	10	5	5	—	—	—	—	—
Mean daily maximum °F	61	63	66	68	73	79	82	84	79	72	66	63	71
Daily mean °F	50	48	52	55	59	75	75	75	70	64	55	52	61
Mean daily minimum °F	52	54	55	57	61	64	68	70	66	63	57	54	60
Average precipitation inches	—	—	—	—	—	0.4	0.2	0.2	—	—	—	—	—
Average precipitation days	13	11	10	10	9	3	2	2	6	13	12	15	106
Source 1: World Weather Online
Source 2: spanishweather

== See also ==
- List of municipalities in Málaga
