= Almáchar =

- Municipality
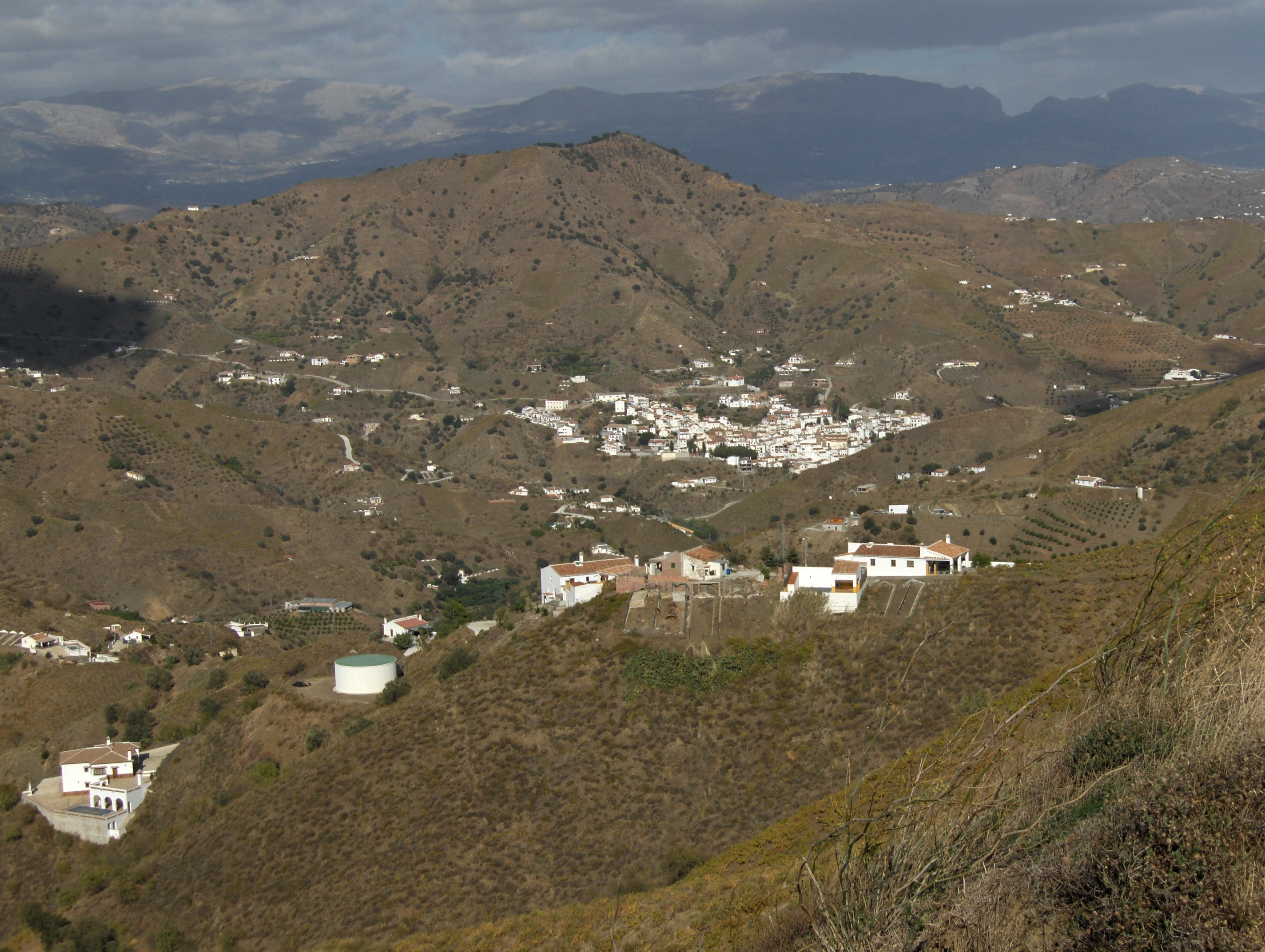

- Flag Coat of arms

- Municipal location in the Province of Málaga

- Location in Spain
- Coordinates: 36°48′N 4°14′W
- Sovereign state: Spain
- Autonomous community: Andalusia
- Province: Málaga
- Comarca: Axarquía

Area
  - Total: 14.3 km^{2} (5.5 sq mi)

Population (2025-01-01)
  - Total: 1,959
  - Density: 137/km^{2} (355/sq mi)
- Demonym: Almachareños
- Time zone: UTC+1 (CET)
  - Summer (DST): UTC+2 (CEST)
- Website: www.almachar.es

Almáchar is a town and municipality in the province of Málaga, part of the autonomous community of Andalusia in southern Spain. The municipality is situated approximately 35 kilometres from Málaga capital. It has a population of approximately 2,100 residents. It is the capital of the moscatel raisin area. Natives of the area are called Almachareños. Its name comes from the Arabic word machar, which means meadow.

Almáchar is situated in the heart of the Axarquía at 200 metres above sea level, 35 kilometres from Málaga city and 14 from Vélez-Málaga. It is built on a small hill between the El Borge and Almáchar rivers, close to the Mountains of Málaga and surrounded by vineyards, olive and cereal groves.

== Church of San Mateo ==
The Church of San Mateo dates from the 17th century, built in the late Gothic and Renaissance style. It was built in three columned naves, with peaked arches. The ceiling structure is different on the central and outside naves, the central one hiding its structure beneath a panelled arch. The front section of this makes a vault in the shape of a cross. The two vesting rooms, built before the main structure, are in an obvious rococo style.

== See also ==
- List of municipalities in Málaga
