= Cútar =

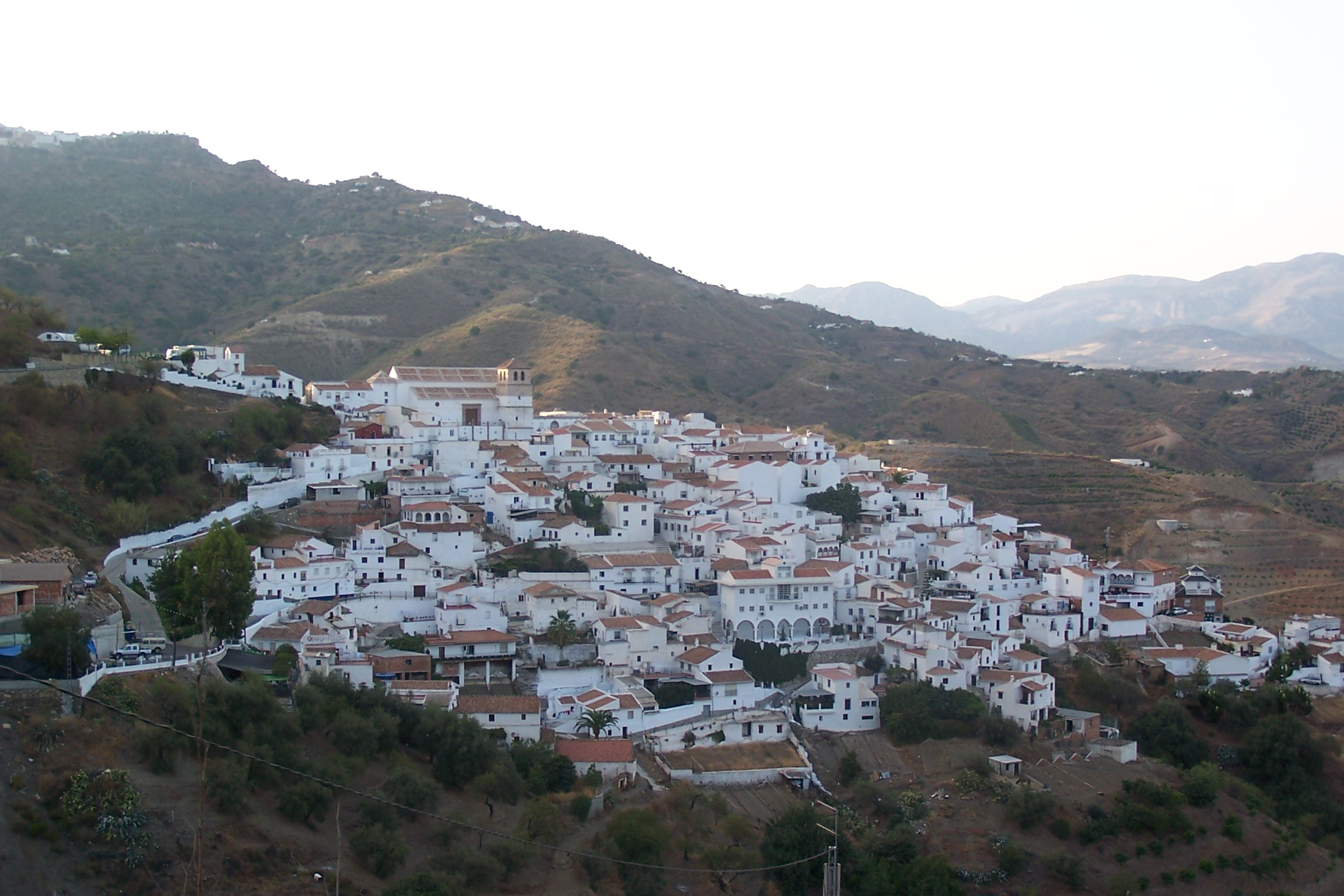

- Coat of arms

- Location in Spain.
- Coordinates: 36°50′N 4°14′W
- Sovereign state: Spain
- Autonomous community: Andalusia
- Province: Málaga

Population (2025-01-01)
  - Total: 603
- Time zone: UTC+1 (CET)
  - Summer (DST): UTC+2 (CEST)
- Website: www.cutar.es

Cútar is a town and municipality in the province of Málaga, part of the autonomous community of Andalusia in southern Spain. The municipality is situated approximately 10 kilometers from Vélez-Málaga and 32 km from the provincial capital of Málaga. It is located inside the comarca of Axarquia. It has a population of approximately 650 residents. The natives are called Cuatreños and their nickname is Pelones. The name Cútar may came from Kautzar, the Arabic word for "fountain of paradise", or from Hisn Aqut, Arabic for "castle of Aqut."

== See also ==
- Cútar manuscripts
- List of municipalities in Málaga
