= Yunquera =

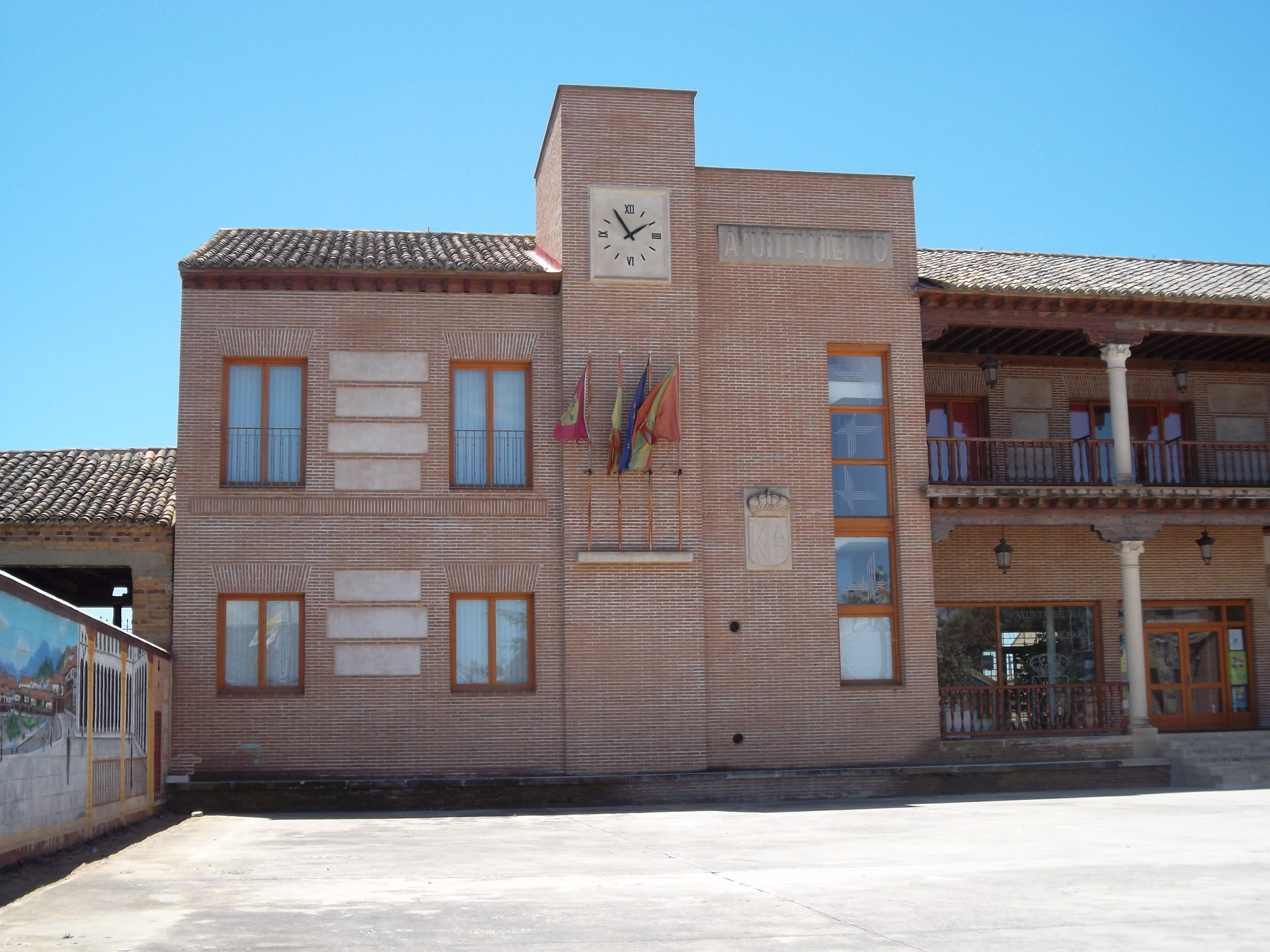
- Town hall

- Flag Coat of arms

- Location in Spain. Yunquera (Andalusia)
- Coordinates: 36.733°N 4.917°W
- Sovereign state: Spain
- Autonomous community: Andalusia
- Province: Málaga

Area
  - Total: 58 km^{2} (22 sq mi)
- Elevation: 681 m (2,234 ft)

Population (2025-01-01)
  - Total: 2,828
  - Density: 49/km^{2} (130/sq mi)
- Time zone: UTC+1 (CET)
  - Summer (DST): UTC+2 (CEST)
- Website: www.yunquera.es

Yunquera is a town and municipality in the province of Málaga, part of the autonomous community of Andalucía in southern Spain. It is located in the east of the province. The municipality is situated approximately 36 kilometres from Ronda and 63 from the provincial capital of Málaga. It has a population of approximately 3300 residents. The natives are called Yunqueranos.

The temperature in winter can drop to below 20 °C, and in summer, can be in the 40s in the shade.

It is also the most elevated town in the province of Malaga.

== See also ==
- List of municipalities in Málaga
