= Casarabonela =

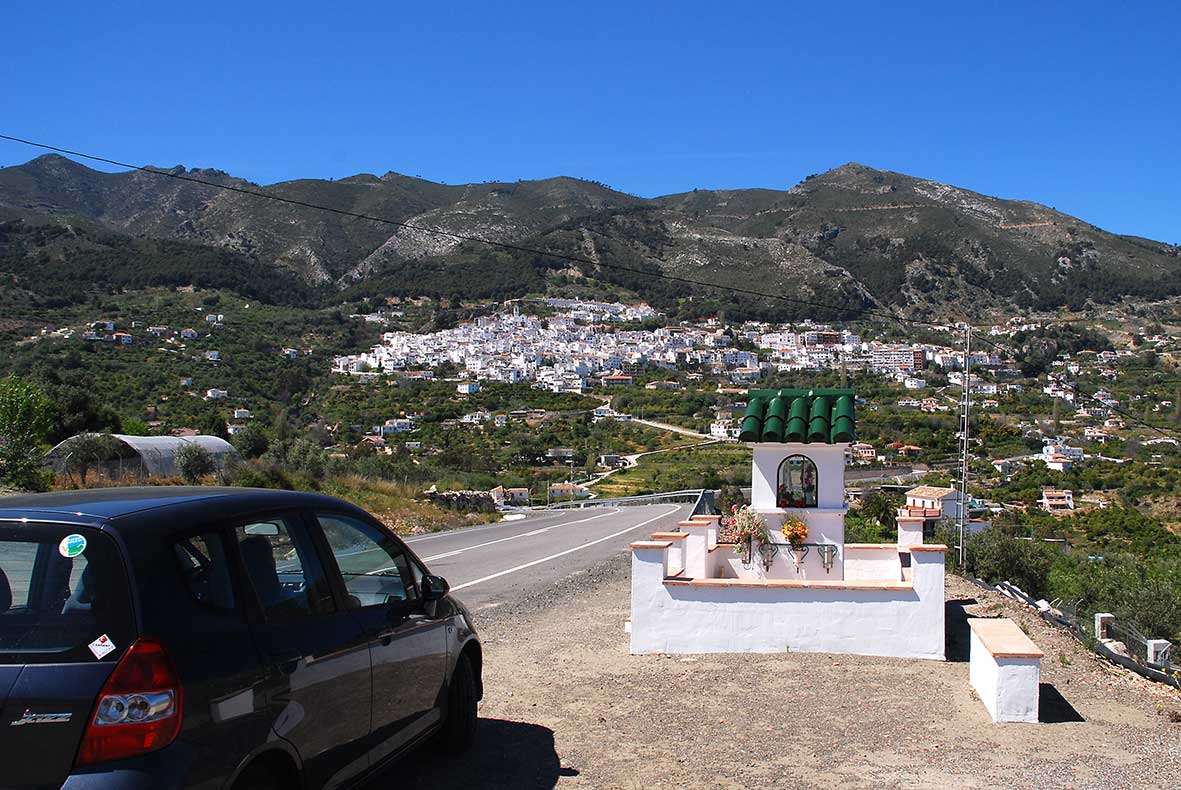
- View to Casarabonela

- Flag Coat of arms

- Location in Spain.
- Coordinates: 36°47′N 4°51′W
- Sovereign state: Spain
- Autonomous community: Andalusia
- Province: Málaga

Area
  - Total: 113.72 km^{2} (43.91 sq mi)
- Elevation: 514 m (1,686 ft)

Population (2025-01-01)
  - Total: 2,800
  - Density: 25/km^{2} (64/sq mi)
- Time zone: UTC+1 (CET)
  - Summer (DST): UTC+2 (CEST)
- Website: www.casarabonela.es

Casarabonela is a town and municipality in the province of Málaga, part of the autonomous community of Andalusia in southern Spain. The municipality is situated approximately 48 km from Malaga capital (bordering on the regions of Antequera and Ronda). It has a population of approximately 2,500 residents. The natives are called Moriscos.

== Etymology ==
The name derives from the Arabic قصر بنيرة - QaSr Bunayra "The Alcazar (Palace) of Bonéra", as attested to by Ibn al-Qūṭiyya.

== Climate ==
Climate data for Casarabonela (elevation: 480m, data from 1967-1981)
Month	Jan	Feb	Mar	Apr	May	Jun	Jul	Aug	Sep	Oct	Nov	Dec	Year
Mean daily maximum °C (°F)	15.7 (60.3)	15.2 (59.4)	16.8 (62.2)	17.9 (64.2)	20.9 (69.6)	25.0 (77.0)	29.0 (84.2)	30.3 (86.5)	25.0 (77.0)	22.2 (72.0)	18.2 (64.8)	15.9 (60.6)	21.0 (69.8)
Daily mean °C (°F)	11.7 (53.1)	11.3 (52.3)	12.4 (54.3)	13.2 (55.8)	15.8 (60.4)	19.4 (66.9)	23.2 (73.8)	24.3 (75.7)	20.0 (68.0)	17.5 (63.5)	14.1 (57.4)	11.8 (53.2)	16.2 (61.2)
Mean daily minimum °C (°F)	7.6 (45.7)	7.5 (45.5)	7.9 (46.2)	8.6 (47.5)	10.7 (51.3)	13.7 (56.7)	17.4 (63.3)	18.3 (64.9)	15.1 (59.2)	12.9 (55.2)	10.0 (50.0)	7.7 (45.9)	11.5 (52.7)
Source: Sistema de Clasificación Bioclimática Mundial
