= Colmenar =

- Municipality
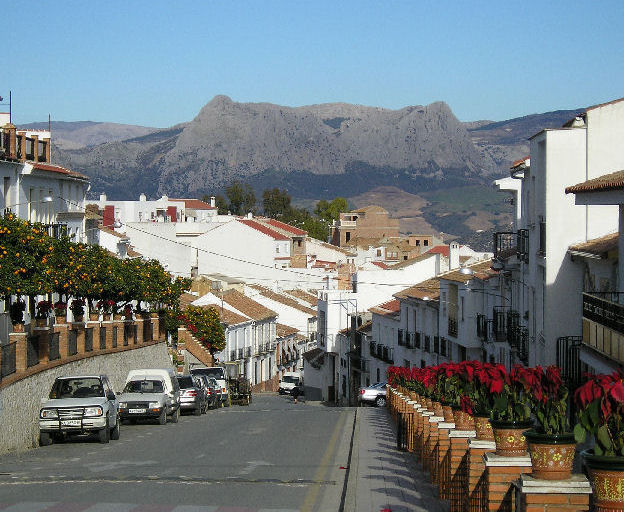

- Flag Coat of arms

- Location in Spain
- Coordinates: 36°54′19″N 4°20′11″W
- Sovereign state: Spain
- Autonomous community: Andalusia
- Province: Málaga
- Comarca: Axarquía

Government
  - Mayor: Pedro Fernández Palomo (PSOE)

Area
  - Total: 66 km^{2} (25 sq mi)

Population (2025-01-01)
  - Total: 3,626
  - Density: 55/km^{2} (140/sq mi)
- Demonym: Colmenarenses or Tinajeros
- Time zone: UTC+1 (CET)
  - Summer (DST): UTC+2 (CEST)
- Website: Official website

Colmenar is a municipality in the province of Málaga in Andalusia, southern Spain.

Colmenar has been populated since the Neolithic age, as testified by the remains found at the Cueva de las Pulseras. After the Reconquest, the town was named after a nearby farm known as Colmenar (Spanish: 'apiary') for its great number of beehives. The history of the village began in 1487, but it is not before 1777 that it became independent as a township.

Colmenar houses the region's medical center.

== Main sights ==
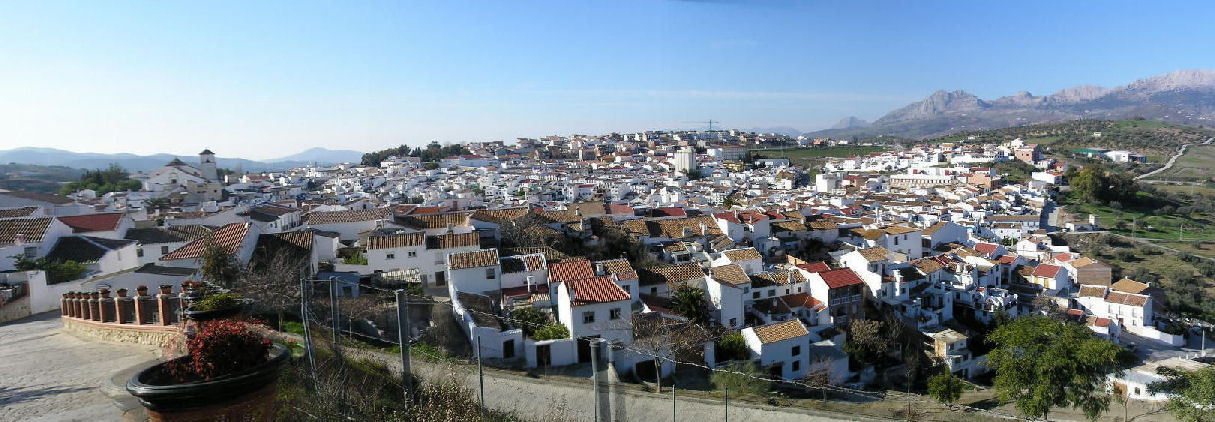
The view from La Santísima.

On top of the hill, overlooking the village and its surrounding valleys, is the hermitage of La Santísima Virgen de la Candelaria. It was built in the 17th century and is nowadays declared a historical local monument. The hermitage is consecrated to the patron saint of Colmenar.

== See also ==
- List of municipalities in Málaga
