= Towns of the Costa del Sol =

Towns in Andalusia, Spain

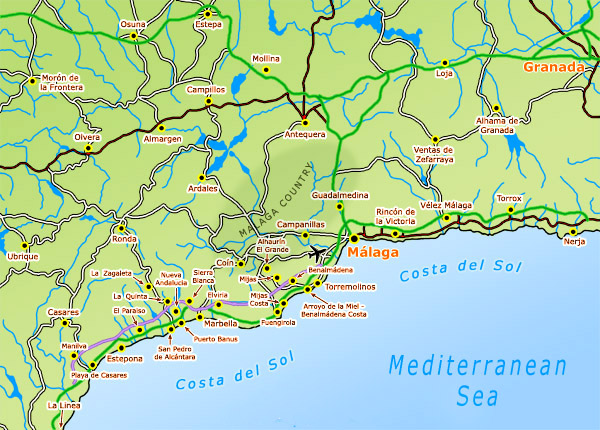
Map of Costa del Sol - cities, towns, resorts, villages

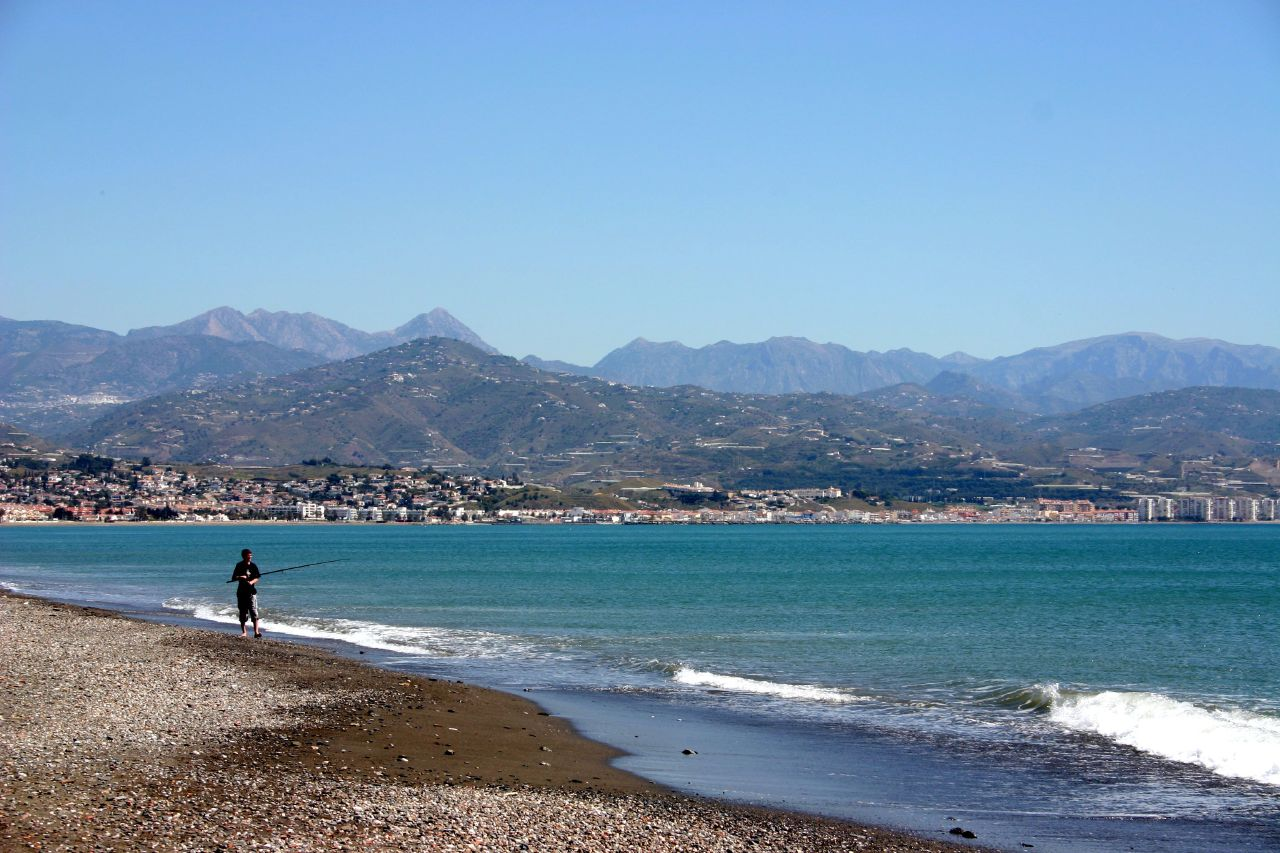
Torre del Mar, Vélez-Málaga

This article shows a list of towns in the Costa del Sol in Andalusia, Spain. Note: Torre del Mar is not listed.

== A ==
- Algarrobo
- Algatocín
- Alhaurín de la Torre
- Alhaurín el Grande
- Almáchar
- Almargen
- Almogía
- Álora
- Alozaina
- Alpandeire
- Antequera
- Árchez
- Archidona
- Ardales
- Arenas
- Arriate

== B ==
- Benadalid
- Benahavís
- Benalauría
- Benalmádena
- Benamargosa
- Benamocarra
- Benaoján
- Benarrabá
- El Borge
- El Burgo

== C ==
- (Sitio de) Calahonda
- Campillos
- Canillas del Aceituno
- Canillas de Albaida
- Cañete La Real
- Carratraca
- Cartajima
- Cártama
- Casabermeja
- Casarabonela
- Casares
- Coín
- Colmenar
- Comares
- Cómpeta
- Cortes de la Frontera
- Cuevas Bajas
- Cuevas de San Marcos
- Cuevas del Becerro
- Cútar

== E ==
- Estepona

== F ==
- Faraján
- Frigiliana
- Fuengirola
- Fuente de Piedra

== G ==
- Gaucín
- Genalguacil
- Guaro

== H ==
- Humilladero

== I ==
- Igualeja
- Istán
- Iznate

== J ==
- Jimera de Líbar
- Jubrique
- Júzcar

== L ==
- La Cala de Mijas
- La Viñuela

== M ==
- Macharaviaya
- Málaga (Capital)
- Manilva
- Marbella
- Mijas
- Moclinejo
- Mollina
- Monda
- Montejaque

== N ==
- Nerja

== O ==
- Ojén

== P ==
- Parauta
- Periana
- Pizarra
- Pujerra

== R ==
- Rincón de la Victoria
- Riogordo
- Ronda

== S ==
- Safiya
- Sayalonga
- Sedella
- Sierra de Yeguas
- San Pedro de Alcántara

== T ==
- Teba
- Tolox
- Torremolinos
- Torrox
- Totalán

== V ==
- Valle de Abdalajís
- Vélez-Málaga
- Villanueva de Algaidas
- Villanueva de la Concepción
- Villanueva de Tapia
- Villanueva del Rosario
- Villanueva del Trabuco

== Y ==
- Yunquera
