= Serranía de Ronda =

Coordinates: 36°37′26″N 5°13′28″W

- Comarca
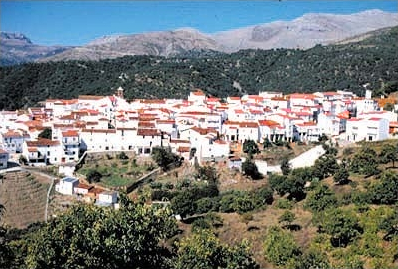
- Farajan.

- Location of Serranía de Ronda in Andalusia, Spain

- Location of Serranía de Ronda in the province of Málaga
- Country: Spain
- Autonomous community: Andalusia
- Province: Málaga
- Capital: Ronda
- Municipalities: List: Algatocín, Alpandeire, Arriate, Atajate, Benadalid, Benalauría, Benaoján, Benarrabá, Cartajima, Cortes de la Frontera, Faraján, Gaucín, Genalguacil, Igualeja, Jimera de Líbar, Jubrique, Júzcar, Montejaque, Parauta, Pujerra, Ronda

Area
  - Total: 1,359.30 km^{2} (524.83 sq mi)

Population (2023) (Note: Estimate at 1 January 2023: National Statistics Institute (Spain))
  - Total: 54,267
  - Density: 39.923/km^{2} (103.40/sq mi)
- Time zone: UTC+1 (CET)
  - Summer (DST): UTC+2 (CEST)

The Serranía de Ronda is one of the nine comarcas in the western part of the province of Málaga, Andalusia, Spain. This comarca was established in 2003 by the Government of Andalusia. As is currently (as of 2009) the norm in Andalusia, it has no formal status. The 2007 Statute of Autonomy of Andalusia, unlike its 1981 predecessor, mentions comarcas in Article 97 of Title III, which defines the significance of comarcas and establishes a basis for formal recognition in future legislation, but no such legislation has yet been enacted.

== Geography ==
It is an area of natural beauty and geographical diversity, popular with walkers, birdwatchers, climbers and potholers. It contains both the Sierra de Grazalema Natural Park - reputedly one of the wettest regions in Spain - and the Sierra de las Nieves. The central town of Ronda is the administrative headquarters, perched on a high plateau, with numerous small, white villages dotted around the surrounding countryside.

There are limestone escarpments, cork forests and fields of wheat and sunflowers. Numerous small rivers cross the landscape. The climate is generally dry and hot in summer, with mild spring and autumn seasons. Winters can be very cold, particularly at night, and snow is not uncommon at the higher altitudes. Cloudless days in winter can be warm and bright, and the light is considered to be good for photography and painting.

Ornithologists value this area as a major migration route and some rare species can be seen.

== Municipalities ==
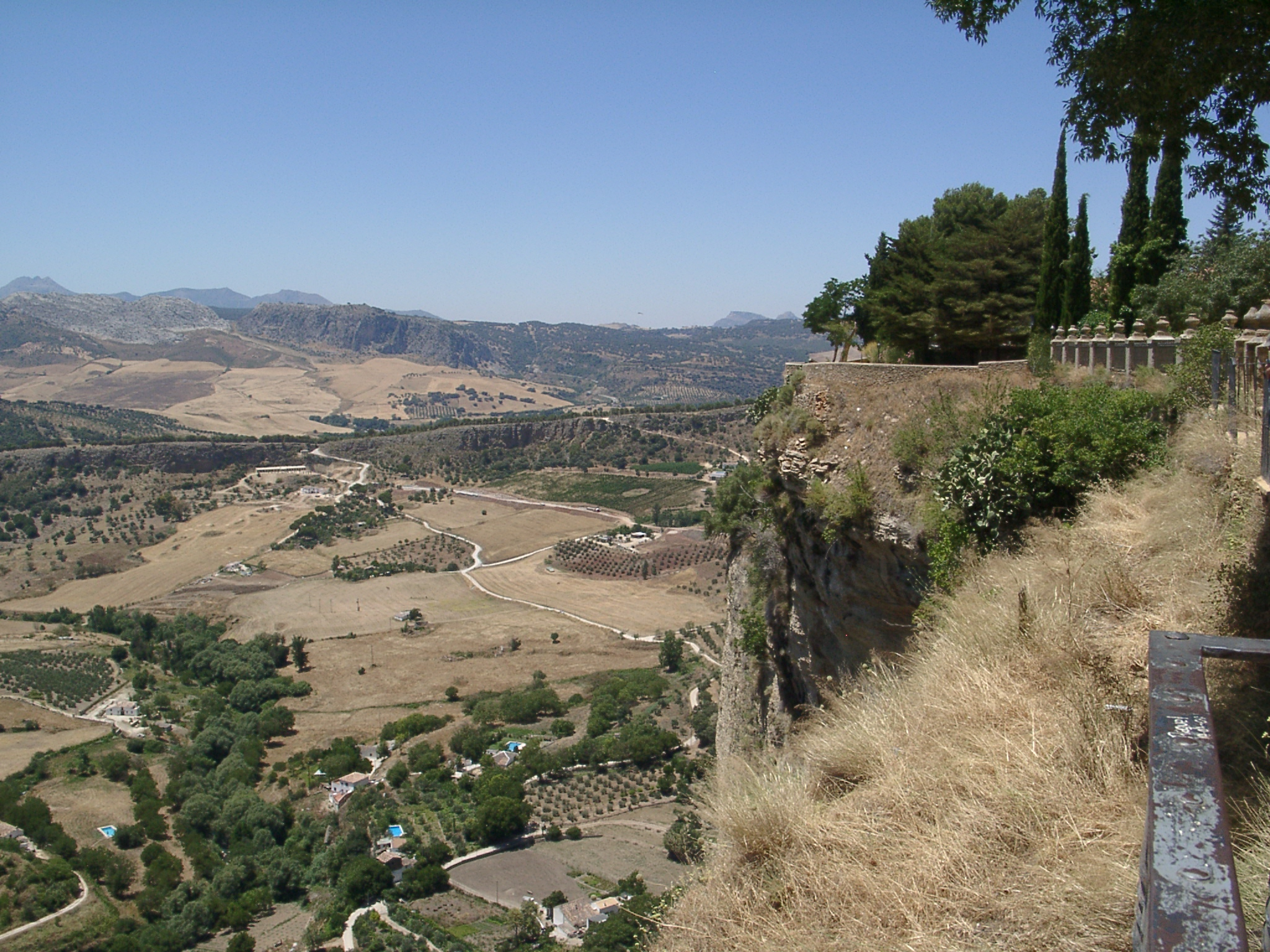
Looking from a park in Ronda to the countryside below.

According to the Provincial Deputation of Málaga, the comarca consists of the following municipalities. The Regional Government of Andalusia also added the municipalities of Cuevas del Becerro and El Burgo in 2003, and Montecorto in 2014.

Arms	Municipality	Area (km^{2})	Population (2023) (Note: Estimate at 1 January 2023: National Statistics Institute (Spain))	Density (/km^{2})
	Algatocín	19.72	829	42.04
	Alpandeire	31.25	281	8.99
	Arriate	8.27	4,068	491.90
	Atajate	10.90	185	16.97
	Benadalid	20.68	230	11.12
	Benalauría	19.75	460	23.29
	Benaoján	32.00	1,437	44.91
	Benarrabá	24.90	454	18.23
	El Burgo	118,35	1,780	15.04
	Cartajima	21.47	232	10.81
	Cortes de la Frontera	175.34	3,014	17.19
	Cuevas del Becerro	16.01	1,592	99.44
	Faraján	20.41	280	13.72
	Gaucín	98.26	1,591	16.19
	Genalguacil	31.87	410	12.86
	Igualeja	43.87	774	17.64
	Jimera de Líbar	27.18	400	14.72
	Jubrique	39.33	561	14.26
	Júzcar	33.66	243	7.22
	Montecorto	54.50	588	10.79
	Montejaque	45.47	970	21.33
	Parauta	44.49	280	6.29
	Pujerra	24.39	279	11.44
	Ronda	397.23	33,329	83.81
	Total	1,359.30	54,267	39.92

== Statistics ==
Naturally, the basic statistics are slightly different, depending on whether or not Cuevas del Becerro and El Burgo are counted as part of the comarca.

	Population	Surface area	Population density
Provincial Deputation definition	54,547	1,256 km^{2}	42.08 / km^{2}
Autonomous Government definition	58,443	1,389 km^{2}	42.08 / km^{2}
