= Leopold of Alpandeire =

Spanish Capuchin friar and blessed

Blessed Leopold of Alpandeire OFMCap
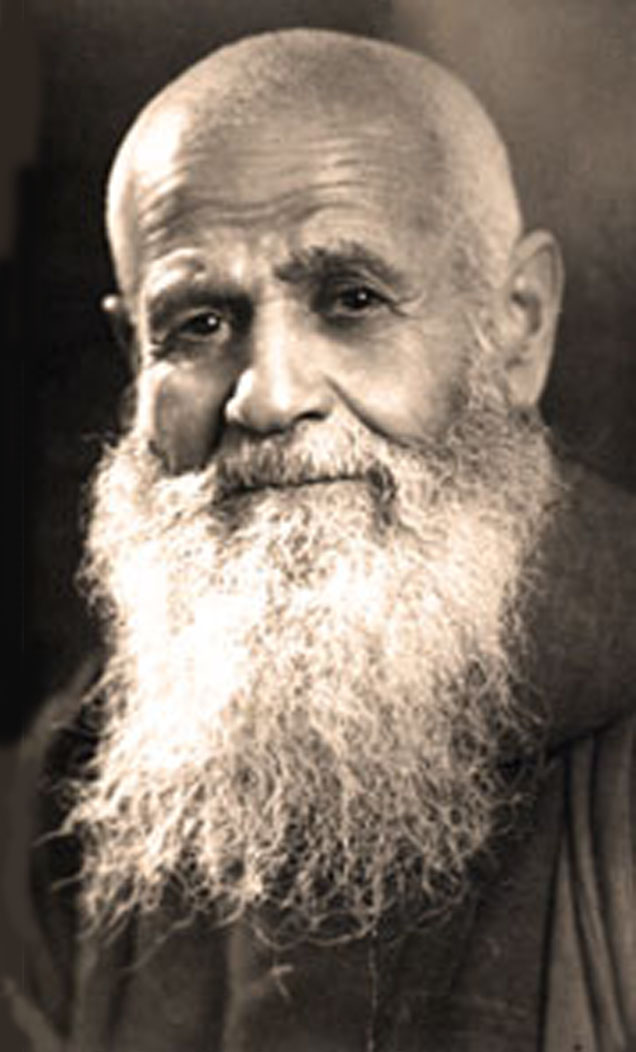
- Born: 24 June 1864; Alpandeire, Málaga, Spain
- Died: 9 February 1956 (aged 91); Granada
- Beatified: 12 September 2010, Armilla Air Base, Armilla by Archbishop Angelo Amato
- Major shrine: Crypt of the Capuchin convent in Granada
- Feast: 9 February

Leopold of Alpandeire (Spanish: Leopoldo de Alpandeire; 24 June 1864 – 9 February 1956) – born Francisco Tomás de San Juan Bautista Márquez y Sánchez – was a Spanish Capuchin friar. He spent most of his life in Granada, where its people still remember and celebrate him as a model example of Christian life and virtue. Devotion to the friar has spread considerably in southern Spain. He was beatified in September 2010.

== Biography ==
=== Early life ===
Francisco Tomás de San Juan Bautista Márquez y Sánchez was born on 24 June 1864, in Alpandeire, Spain, a small village in the province of Málaga, and was baptized on 29 June. His parents, Diego Márquez y Ayala and Jerónima Sánchez y Jiménez, were peasants. The family, although of modest condition, owned land dedicated to the cultivation of cereals and almond trees, as well as some goats. Marquez was the eldest son out of four children from that marriage; he had two brothers and one sister.

He spent his entire childhood and youth in Alpandeire dedicated to agricultural work, except for a period of military service (1887–1888), which he carried out in the Pavía Infantry Regiment in Malaga.

=== Religious life ===
Márquez decided to dedicate himself to religious life after hearing two Capuchins preach in the city of Ronda (on the occasion of the beatification of Diego José de Cádiz in 1894). He later declared that the secluded way of life of those men had made a good impression on him. He felt attracted by the idea of serving God by becoming similar to them.

After several failed attempts, he entered the Capuchin convent in Seville in 1899 as a postulant and took the religious name Leopold (of Alpandeire). In 1900 he made his vows. After successive assignments in Antequera, Granada and again Seville, on February 21, 1914, he was definitively transferred to the convent of Granada, where he resided for 42 years.

Most of the time Leopold served as sacristan and questor of the community, which had him walk around the city and into many homes requesting donations. Gradually he became a familiar sight in the city, so many people sought his advice or intercession, beginning to know him as "the humble beggar of the three Hail Marys", because that was the prayer dedicated to those who sought his blessing.

Leopold died in Granada on 9 February 1956, and is buried in a crypt of the friary church dedicated to his honor.

== Beatification process ==
The beatification process commenced in 1982; Márquez was named as venerable on 15 March 2008. A tribunal of five doctors analyzed in the Vatican the miraculous case of a patient who was cured through the invocation of the Capuchin friar. The court issued a favorable report in February 2009.

Archbishop Angelo Amato presided over Leopold's beatification on 12 September 2010 on behalf of Pope Benedict XVI. His beatification took place at the Armilla Military Area Base. Up to 120,000 people attended the event.

Benedict XVI, speaking of him, said that "he bore witness to the mystery of Jesus Christ crucified by example and word, at the humble and prayerful rhythm of daily life and by sharing and alleviating the concerns of the poor and afflicted".
