= Cañete la Real =

- Municipality
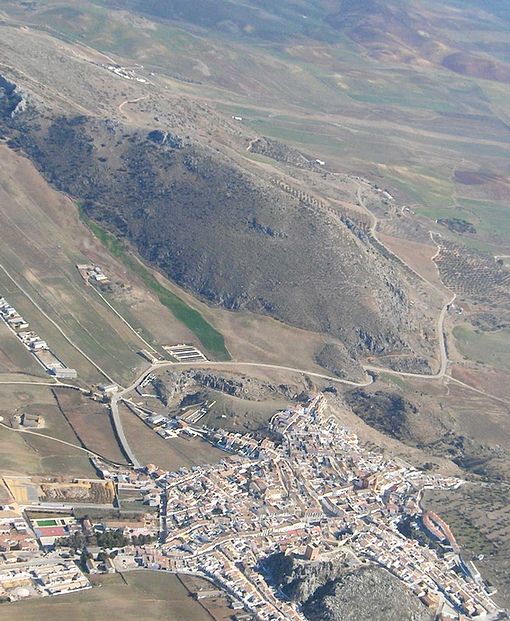
- Aerial view.

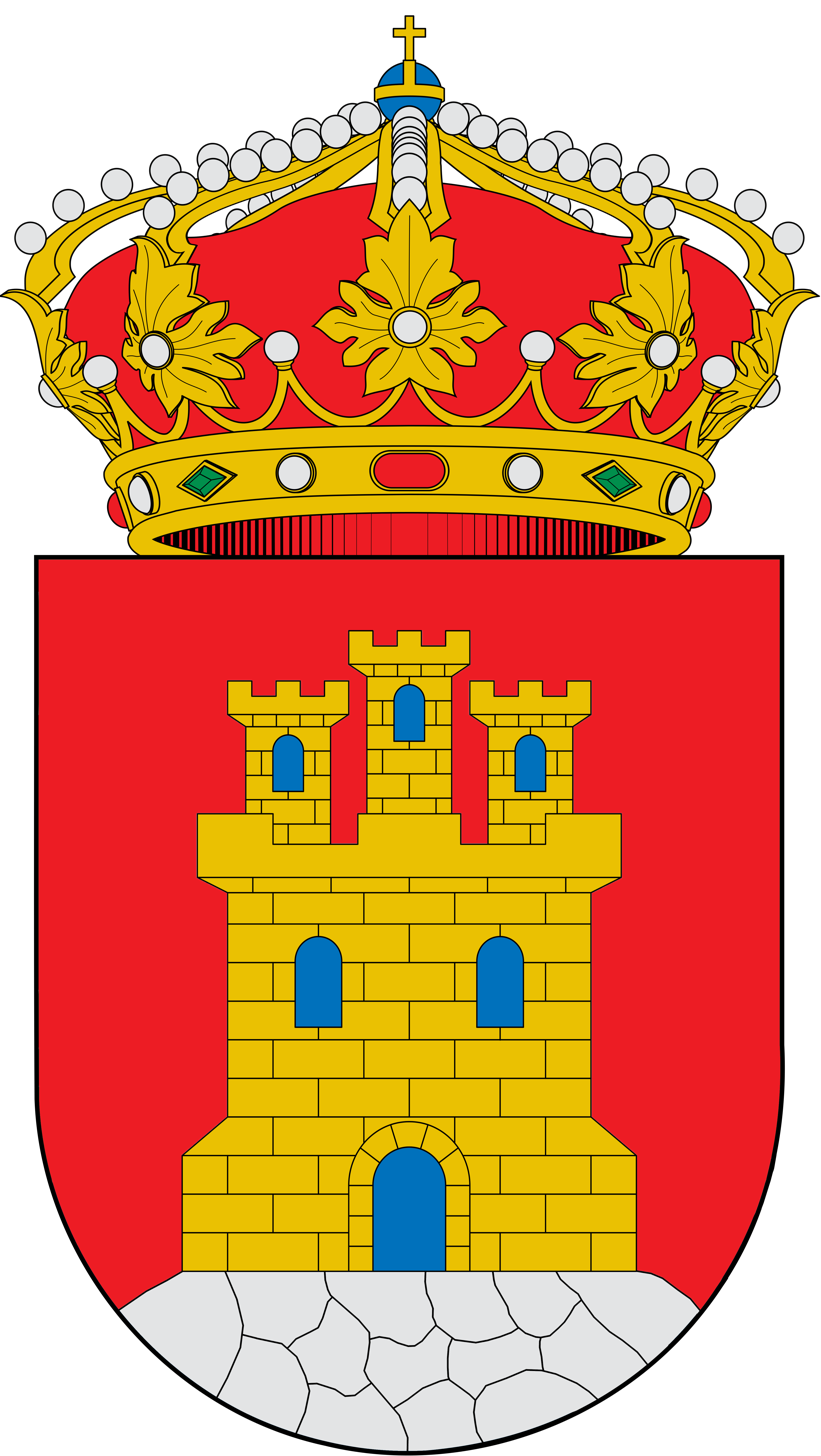
- Coat of arms

- Location in Spain Cañete la Real (Andalusia) Cañete la Real (Spain)
- Coordinates: 36°51′0″N 3°58′59″W
- Sovereign state: Spain
- Autonomous community: Andalusia
- Province: Málaga
- Comarca: Comarca de Antequera

Government
  - Mayor: Francisco Javier López Ponce

Area
  - Total: 165 km^{2} (64 sq mi)
- Elevation: 733 m (2,405 ft)

Population (2025-01-01)
  - Total: 1,569
  - Density: 9.51/km^{2} (24.6/sq mi)
- Demonym: Cañeteros
- Time zone: UTC+1 (CET)
  - Summer (DST): UTC+2 (CEST)
- Postal code: 29340
- Website: Official website

Cañete la Real is a town and municipality in the province of Málaga, part of the autonomous community of Andalusia in southern Spain. It is located on the northwest boundary of the province. The municipality is situated approximately 100 kilometers from Málaga. It is a border town between the Serrania de Ronda and the comarca of Antequera and rises 742 meters above the sea level.

== Geography ==
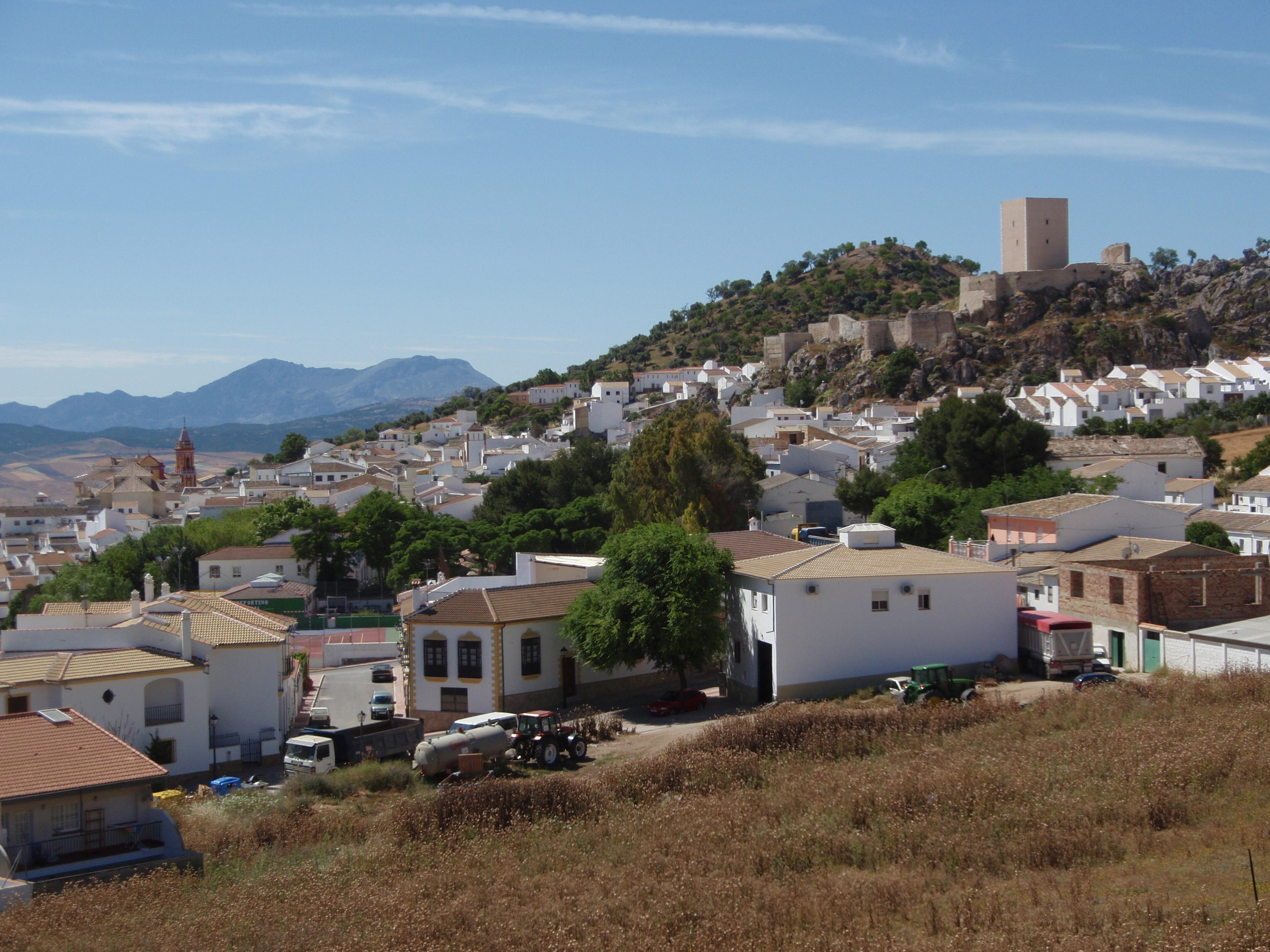

The bordering municipalities with Cañete are: to the north Almargen (Málaga), El Saucejo and Algámitas (Seville); to the east Teba; to the southeast Ardales and El Burgo; to the southwest Cuevas del Becerro and Ronda and to the west Alcalá del Valle and Olvera, belonging to Cadiz.

The slopes of the mountains surrounding the town are covered with groves of oak and scrub pine between limestone rocks. The vegetation is a majority of rosemary and thyme.

Among the wildlife that inhabits this area one can find the griffon vulture, eagle, owl, fox, bobcat, etc.

The main rivers in the municipality are the Guadalteba or Ortegícar, which crosses the south of the municipality, servicing the reservoir of the same name. The Corbones, a tributary of the Guadalquivir River, begins in the environs of La Atalaya, a hamlet of Cañete La Real.

== Origin of name ==
The name Cañete comes from the Arabic name Hisn Qanit, which means "castle of Qanit", while others believe it refers to the caños, meaning "springs" that still flow in some parts of the urban district. La Real means "royal" which refers to King Alfonso XI.

== Twin towns ==
- Sant Sadurní d'Anoia, Spain

== See also ==
- List of municipalities in Málaga
