= Province of Málaga =

Province of Spain

Province of Málaga Provincia de Málaga (Spanish)
- Province
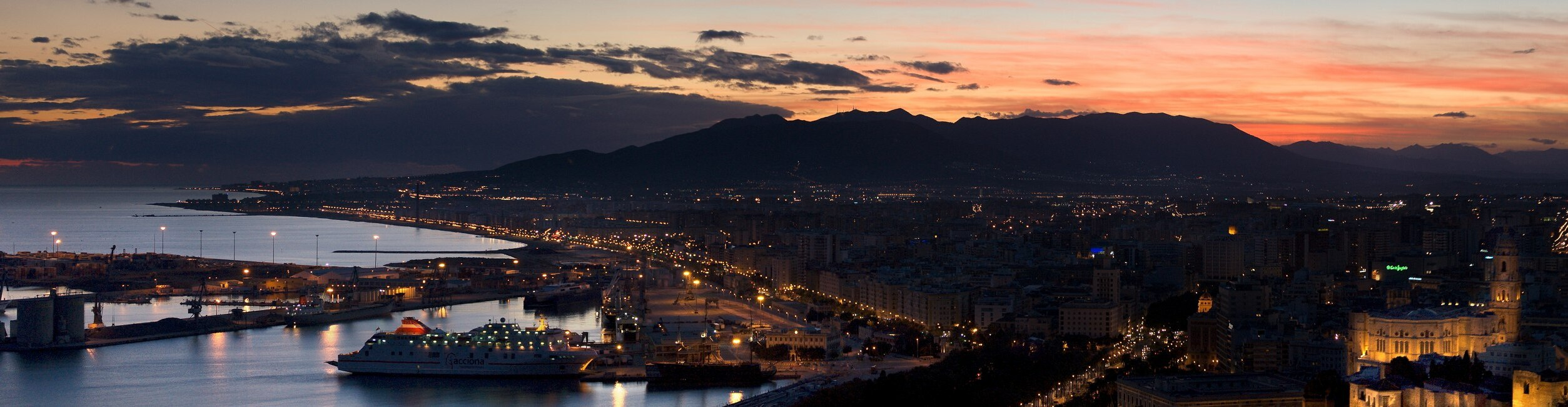
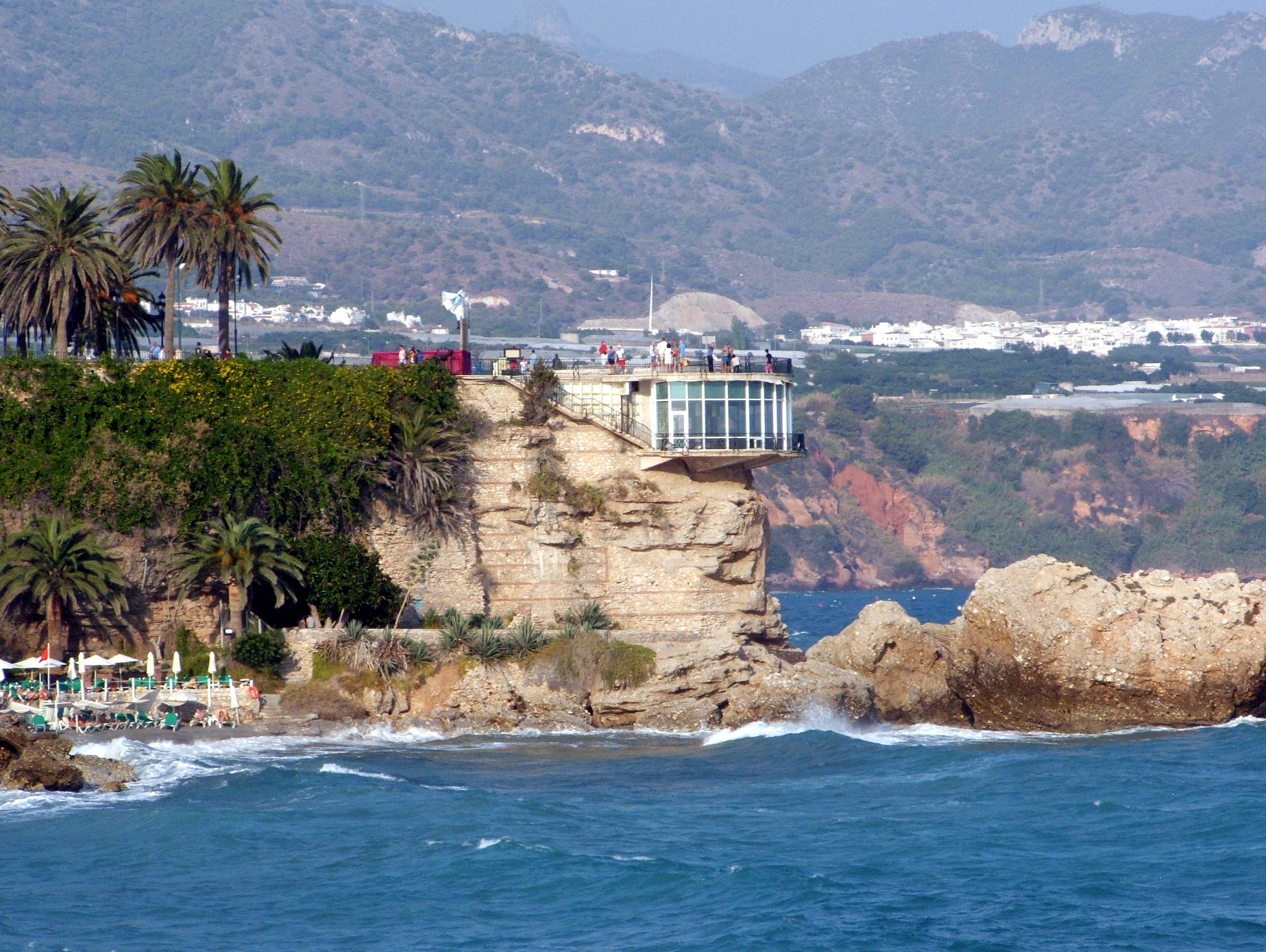
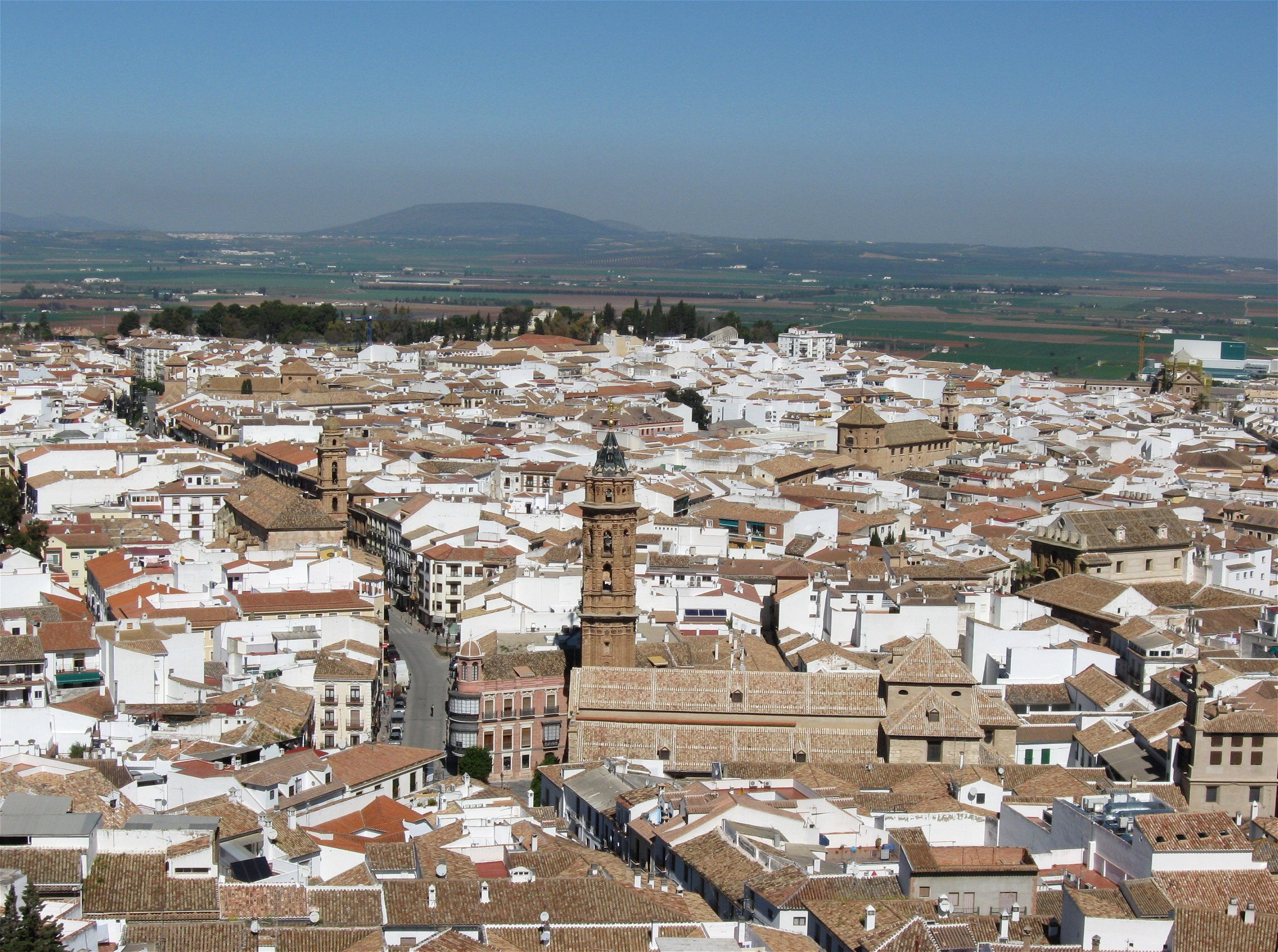
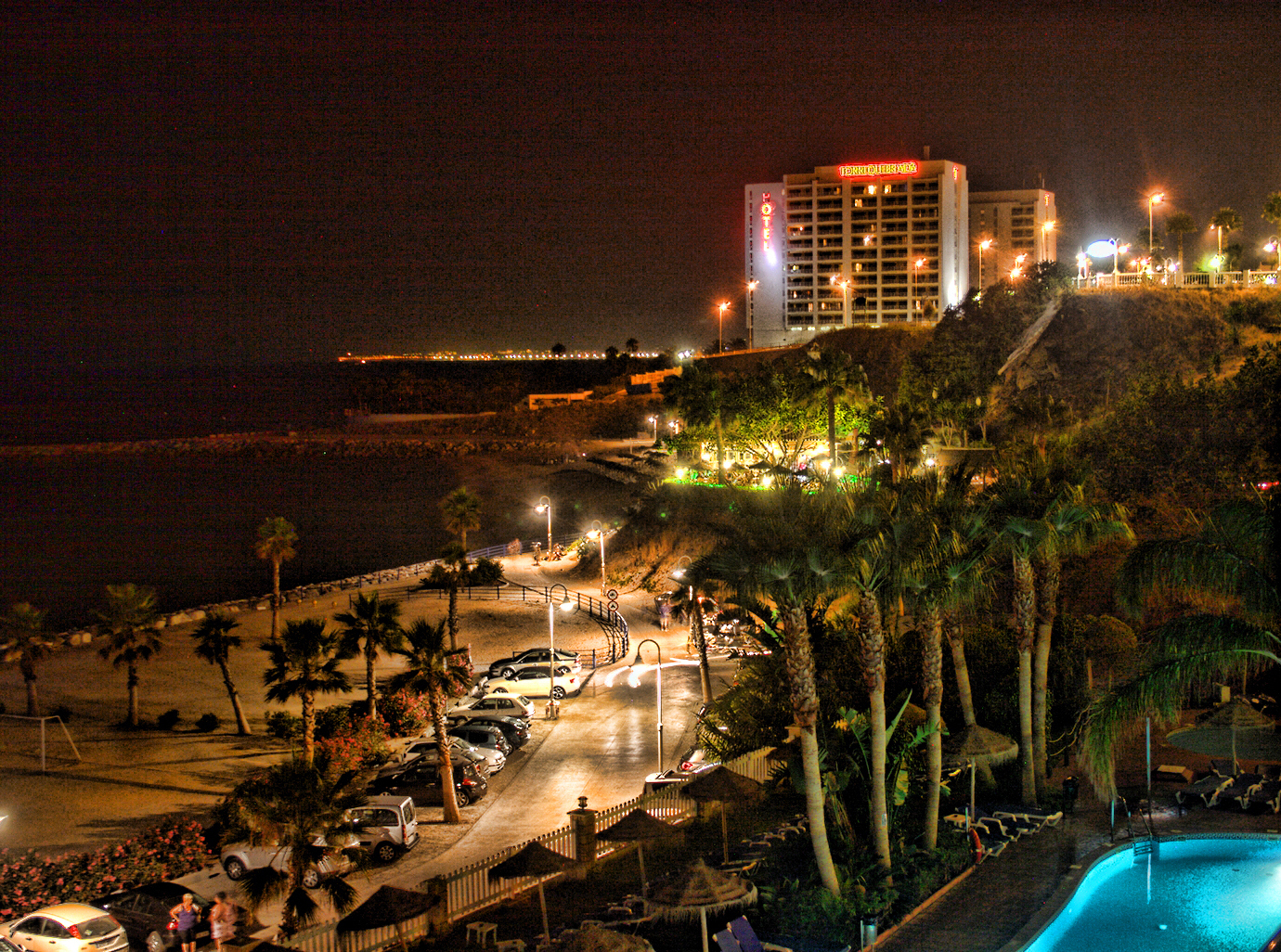
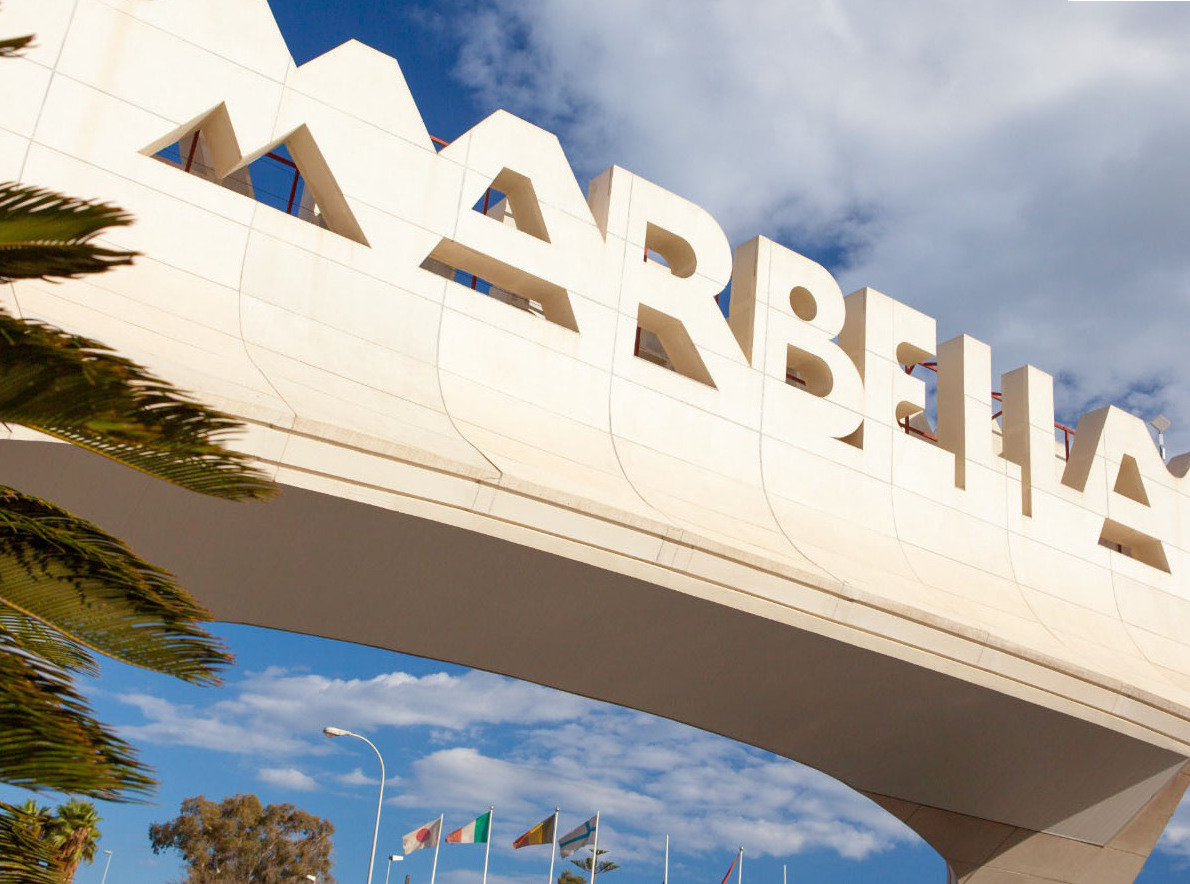
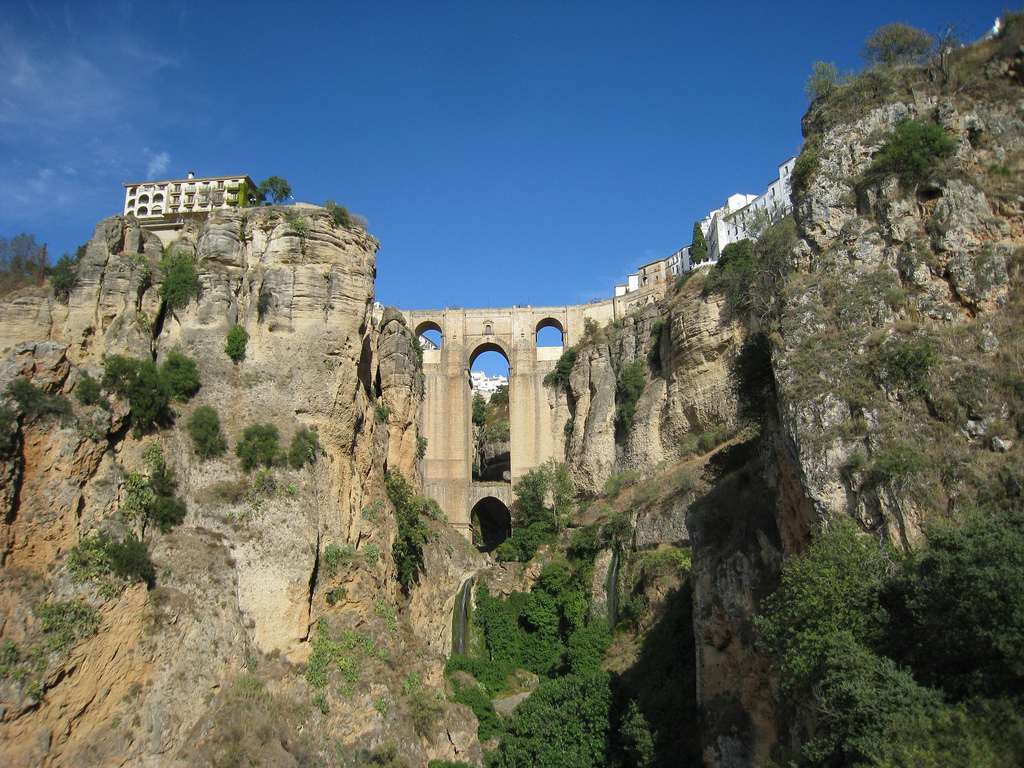
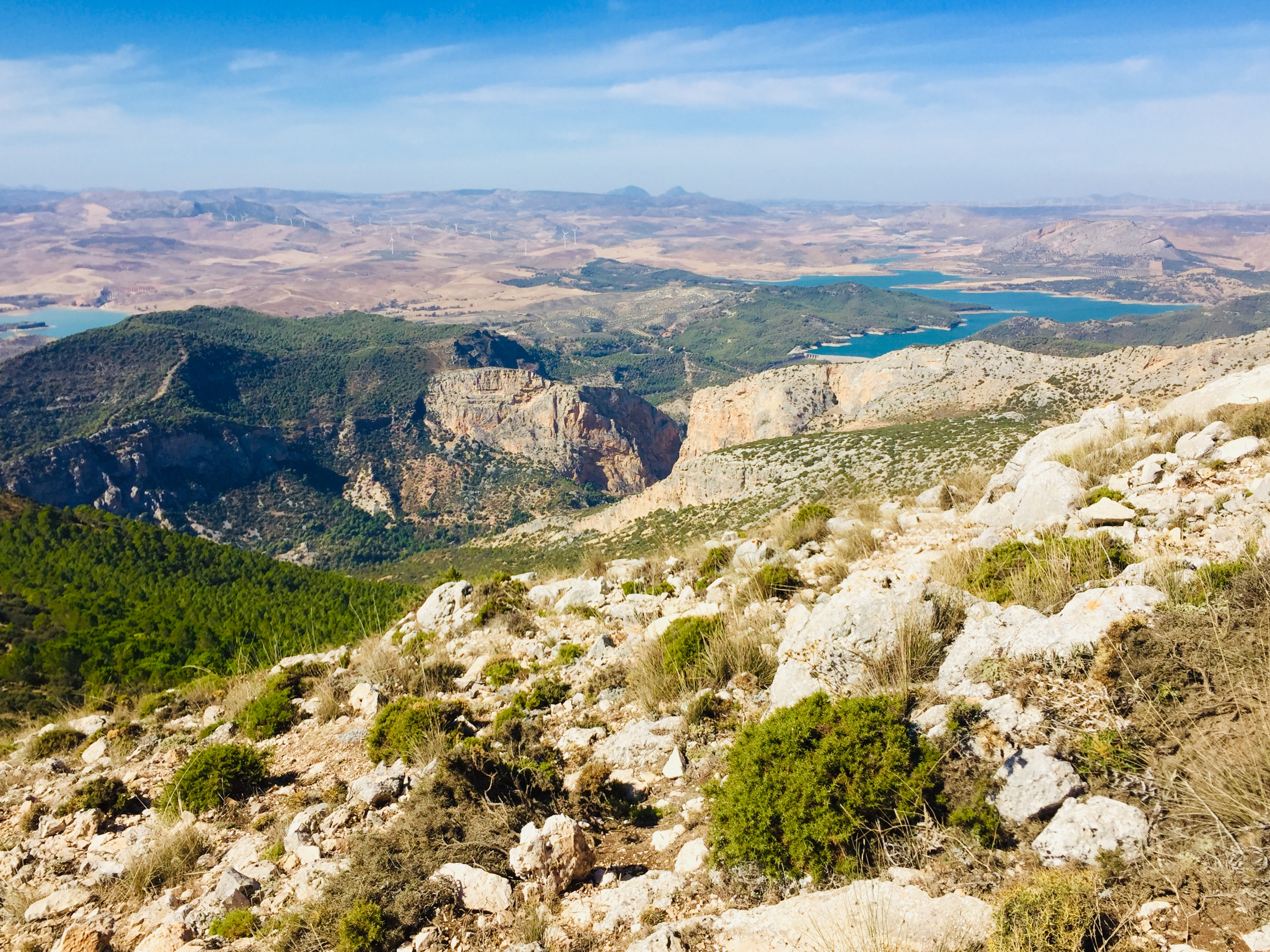
- From the top: Panoramic, Balcony of Europe, Antequera, Benalmádena, Marbella, Ronda and Los Gaitanes Gorge and El Chorro reservoirs.

- Flag Coat of arms

- Location of the Province of Málaga in Spain
- Interactive map of Province of Málaga
- Coordinates: 36°43′N 4°25′W
- Country: Spain
- Autonomous community: Andalusia
- Capital: Málaga
- Municipalities: 103

Government
  - Body: Provincial Deputation of Málaga
  - President: Francisco Salado (PP)

Area
  - Total: 7,307.76 km^{2} (2,821.54 sq mi)
  - Rank: 35th in Spain

Population (2025)
  - Total: 1,791,183
  - Rank: 6th in Spain
  - Density: 245.107/km^{2} (634.824/sq mi)
- Demonym(s): Spanish: Malagueño, Malacitano
- Time zone: UTC+1 (CET)
  - Summer (DST): UTC+2 (CEST)
- ISO 3166 code: ES-MA
- Official language(s): Spanish
- Parliament: Cortes Generales
- Website: malaga.es

The Province of Málaga (Spanish: Provincia de Málaga [ˈmalaɣa]) is a province in the autonomous community of Andalusia in southern Spain. It is bordered by the Mediterranean Sea to the south and by the provinces of Cádiz to the west, Seville to the northwest, Córdoba to the north, and Granada to the east. Its capital is the city of Málaga. Besides the capital, the main cities are Marbella, Mijas, Fuengirola, Vélez-Málaga, Torremolinos, Estepona, and Benalmádena, all in the coastal zone. The towns of Antequera and Ronda are located in the interior.

It has a population of 1,791,183 in an area of 7,307.76 square kilometres (2,821.54 sq mi) across its 103 municipalities, concentrated mainly in the metropolitan area of Málaga, the provincial capital, and throughout the coastal area.

The province is subject to extreme water stress in the wake of the proliferation of avocado plantations in the Axarquía region, with the arid local climate being unsuitable to the plant's large water demands.

== Climate ==
The prevailing climate is a warm Mediterranean, with dry and warm long summers with short mild winters. The geographical relief varies greatly from zone to zone. In general, the coastal zone has a subtropical Mediterranean climate. To the north, a continental Mediterranean climate exists with cold, dry winters and warm summers.

== Regions ==
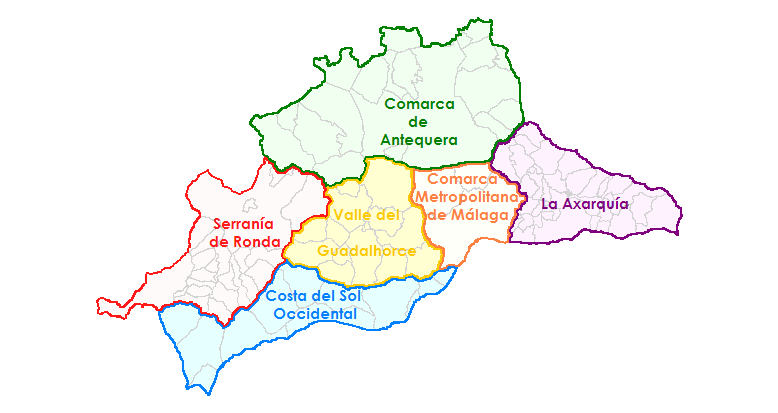
Comarcas of Málaga

- Málaga
- Costa del Sol
- Valle del Guadalhorce
- Axarquía
- Serranía de Ronda
- Antequera

== Comarcas ==
The province has 9 comarcas/counties:

- Antequera
- Axarquía (Eastern Costa del Sol)
- Costa del Sol Occidental (Western Costa del Sol)
- Guadalteba
- Málaga - Costa del Sol
- Nororiental de Málaga
- Serranía de Ronda
- Sierra de las Nieves
- Valle del Guadalhorce

== Municipalities ==
The province has 103 municipalities:

- Alameda
- Alcaucín
- Alfarnate
- Alfarnatejo
- Algarrobo
- Algatocín
- Alhaurín de la Torre
- Alhaurín el Grande
- Almáchar
- Almargen
- Almogía
- Álora
- Alozaina
- Alpandeire
- Antequera
- Árchez
- Archidona
- Ardales
- Arenas
- Arriate
- Atajate
- Benadalid
- Benahavís
- Benalauría
- Benalmádena
- Benamargosa
- Benamocarra
- Benaoján
- Benarrabá
- El Borge
- El Burgo
- Campillos
- Canillas de Aceituno
- Canillas de Albaida
- Cañete la Real
- Carratraca
- Cartajima
- Cártama
- Casabermeja
- Casarabonela
- Casares
- Coín
- Colmenar
- Comares
- Cómpeta
- Cortes de la Frontera
- Cuevas Bajas
- Cuevas del Becerro
- Cuevas de San Marcos
- Cútar
- Estepona
- Faraján
- Frigiliana
- Fuengirola
- Fuente de Piedra
- Gaucín
- Genalguacil
- Guaro
- Humilladero
- Igualeja
- Istán
- Iznate
- Jimera de Líbar
- Jubrique
- Júzcar
- Macharaviaya
- Málaga
- Manilva
- Marbella
- Mijas
- Moclinejo
- Mollina
- Monda
- Montecorto
- Montejaque
- Nerja
- Ojén
- Parauta
- Periana
- Pizarra
- Pujerra
- Rincón de la Victoria
- Riogordo
- Ronda
- Salares
- Sayalonga
- Sedella
- Serrato
- Sierra de Yeguas
- Teba
- Tolox
- Torremolinos
- Torrox
- Totalán
- Valle de Abdalajís
- Vélez-Málaga
- Villanueva de Algaidas
- Villanueva de la Concepción
- Villanueva de Tapia
- Villanueva del Rosario
- Villanueva del Trabuco
- Viñuela
- Yunquera

== Demographics ==
As of 2025, the population is 1,791,183, of which 48.8% are male, and 51.2% are female. Minors make up 17.1% of the population, and seniors make up 19.0%.

Historical population

Year	Pop.	±%
1842	338,142	—
1857	451,406	+33.5%
1877	502,407	+11.3%
1887	523,915	+4.3%
1900	520,429	−0.7%
1910	529,575	+1.8%
1920	562,525	+6.2%
1930	609,613	+8.4%
1940	688,193	+12.9%

Year	Pop.	±%
1950	756,083	+9.9%
1960	781,690	+3.4%
1970	853,579	+9.2%
1981	1,025,609	+20.2%
1991	1,160,843	+13.2%
2001	1,287,017	+10.9%
2011	1,594,808	+23.9%
2021	1,696,955	+6.4%

Source: INE

=== Immigration ===
As of 2025, immigrants make up 24.2% of the population. The 5 largest foreign countries of birth are Morocco, the United Kingdom, Argentina, Colombia, and Ukraine.

== Protected areas ==
- Los Alcornocales Natural Park
- Sierra de las Nieves National Park
- Montes de Málaga Natural Park
- Sierras of Tejeda, Almijara and Alhama Natural Park

== Tourism ==
The main industry and claim to fame are tourist resorts, particularly those on the beaches along the Costa del Sol. These beaches are visited by millions of European tourists; other attractions include the gorge of El Chorro near Álora, El Torcal de Antequera, the Moorish-Mudéjar district of Frigiliana, the Dolmen of Menga, the Tholos de El Romeral, the Dolmen de Viera and the Caves of Nerja.

== See also ==
- List of municipalities in Málaga
