= Atajate =

- Municipality
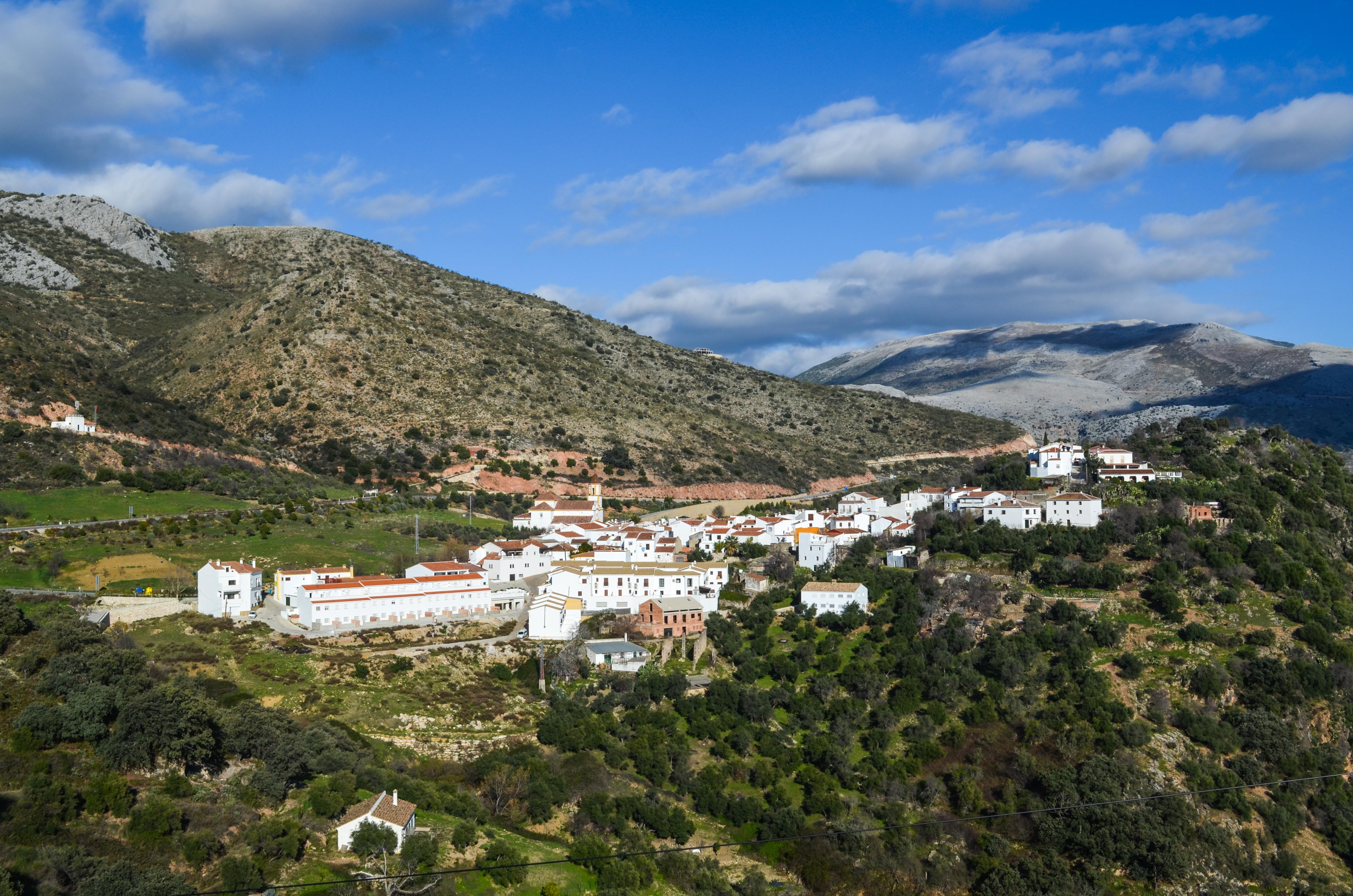

- Coat of arms

- Municipal location in the Province of Málaga

- Location in Spain
- Coordinates: 36°38′24″N 5°14′44″W
- Sovereign state: Spain
- Autonomous community: Andalusia
- Province: Málaga
- Comarca: Serranía de Ronda

Government
  - Mayor: Mª Auxiliadora Sánchez González (PSOE)

Area
  - Total: 11 km^{2} (4.2 sq mi)
- Elevation: 750 m (2,460 ft)

Population (2025-01-01)
  - Total: 168
  - Density: 15/km^{2} (40/sq mi)
- Demonym: Atajateños
- Time zone: UTC+1 (CET)
  - Summer (DST): UTC+2 (CEST)
- Postal code: 29494
- Website: www.atajate.net

Atajate is a municipality in the province of Málaga in the autonomous community of Andalucia in southern Spain. It is located east of the province in the Genal Valley and is one of the towns that make up the region of the Serrania de Ronda. It is the least populated town in the province of Málaga.

== History ==
Pieces of polished stone, known as thunder-stones, Neolithic age axes and Copper Age remains of bronze in the Sima de los Tajos. Remains of Roman road track Lacipo-Arunda and coins. Visigoths remains - burial in the Montecillo. Muslim remains in the Port of Jimera, El Llano and Huerta Nueva. Remains of the unpopulated village of Audalázar, now in the municipality of Alpandeire. In 1496 Atajate was part of the Lordship of Ronda (Prince Don Juan) - Realengo estate lands. In 1499 became part of the Crown of Castile and Aragon. In 1505, was the creation of the parish of Atajate. The turn of the nineteenth century saw the construction of the Church of San Jose. Prior to March 10, 1810, was the sacking of the old Church by the French. It was never again restored. In 1820 establishment of new judicial areas and Atajate passes to the control of Gaucin. In 1932 was the construction of the road Ronda-Atajate, C-341, the current A-369. The stretch of road Atajate-Gaucín was built in 1941.

== Sights and Attractions ==
- Former San Roque Parish Church
- St. Joseph's Church
- Arab Tower

== Festivals ==
- Fiesta del Mosto. (Feast of the Must Wine) Last Saturday of November.
- Motorcycle Rally. Week before the Fiesta del Mosto.
- Pilgrimage Atajate - Alpandeire in honour of the shared village patron, San Roque de Montpellier. on the last Saturday of the Summer.
- Guerra del Agua (Water Fight) is well known and famous in the area. It takes place on the Saturday of the celebration of the Fiesta de San Roque.
- Fiesta de San Roque, 15, 16 and 17 August.
- Corpus Christi procession. (May, June).
- Fiesta del Huerto, Easter Sunday.
- Carnival is before Lent, depending on when Holy Week falls.

== Gastronomy ==
The cuisine is based on the products of the land in terms of seasonality. Throughout the year you can taste the mountain pots and various dishes of chickpeas or lentils, and among the meat dishes are rabbit stew and the wide variety of dishes of pork and sausages. Spring is the time of cooking with wild herbs and thistles, fennel, campion or wild asparagus.

== See also ==
- List of municipalities in Málaga
