= Arriate =

- Municipality
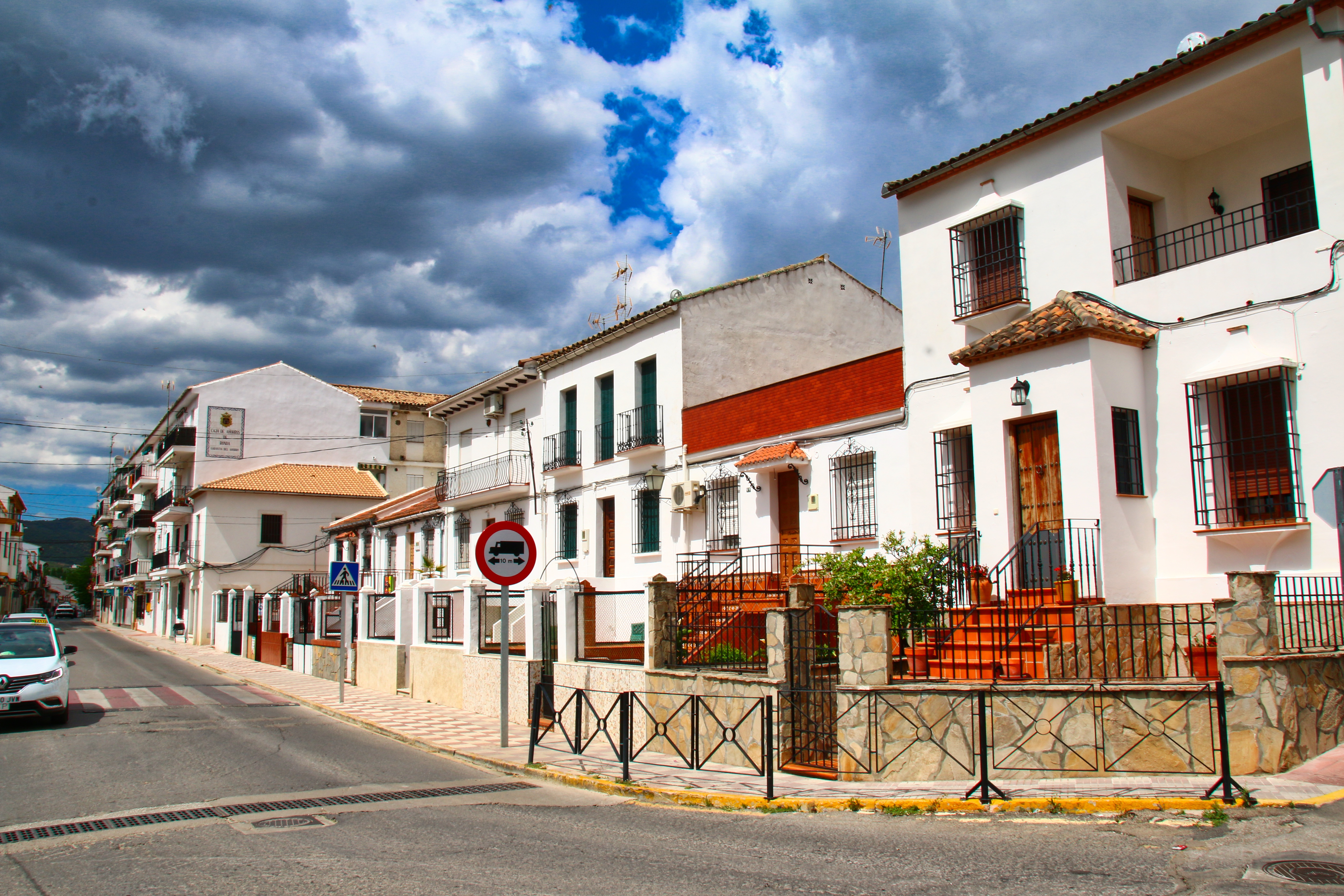

- Flag Coat of arms

- Municipal location in the Province of Málaga

- Location in Spain
- Coordinates: 36°47′57″N 5°8′27″W
- Country: Spain
- Community: Andalusia
- Province: Málaga
- Comarca: Serranía de Ronda

Government
  - Mayor: Francisco Javier Anet Rueda (PSOE)

Area
  - Total: 8.27 km^{2} (3.19 sq mi)
- Elevation: 603 m (1,978 ft)

Population (2025-01-01)
  - Total: 4,049
  - Density: 490/km^{2} (1,270/sq mi)
- Time zone: UTC+1 (CET)
  - Summer (DST): UTC+2 (CEST)
- Postal code: 29350
- Website: www.arriate.es

Arriate is a town and municipality in the Province of Málaga, part of the autonomous community of Andalusia in southern Spain. The municipality is situated approximately 120 kilometres (75 mi) from Malaga capital. It has a population of approximately 3600 residents. The natives are called Arriateños.

== History ==
Long before even Ronda had a name, the Iberians were here, and before them cave dwellers in the hills beside the Rio Guadalcobacin. For about four hundred years, beginning around the 8th Century BC, a complex and lively Iberian settlement existed, comprising at least three related hill forts. Cerro del Coto was particularly suited for the siting of a defensive fort, and archeological finds have confirmed that all of the interacting communities traded with the passing Phoenicians.

On 14 February 1630, the villagers paid 352,739 Maravedíes in order to buy their independence from Ronda. It was then that it adopted its actual name of Arriate, probably taking the name from an estate which had existed since the Arab times. The name Arriate is derived from the Arab term Arriadh, which means "the gardens".

Arriate looks out to the highlands from the slopes of the Guadalcobacín (Guadiaro tributary), in the Ronda depression. This river, which borders the municipality on the north and west, encloses some landscapes of great beauty when the vegetation on the banks close together forming real "gallery-woods". Close to this spot there are fertile plots which reach the boundaries of the town, adding fruit trees and vegetables to the landscape of olive trees and cereals. Arriate, also claims a privileged surrounding, and although it is on the outside of the municipality, acts as a background in which there are the Sierras de Las Cumbres (911 m.) and Salinas (954 m.) mostly covered in holm-oak woods, and the Dehesa de Parchite.

In spite of the scarcity of facts known about the history of Arriate, judging by the caves in the rocks on the banks of the river, it is possible that man's presence in these lands comes from very remote times. Its geographical situation in an area of soft topography and water, as well as the possibilities of hunting in the woods and nearby sierras, would have made it a very favourable place for the first hunters and later farmers.

Arriate, because of the closeness to Ronda, was a place of frequent skirmishes and confrontations in order to obtain the coveted city of Acinipo first and Ronda after, as demonstrated in the Battle of Arriate (Arriate Ambush) which was liberated in 1407 between the Christian and Muslim armies, when Hernando Arias, the mayor of Canete la Real, had his troops set an ambush for the Muslim armies, inflicting numerous casualties. They attacked the Moors in the Guadalcobacín river.

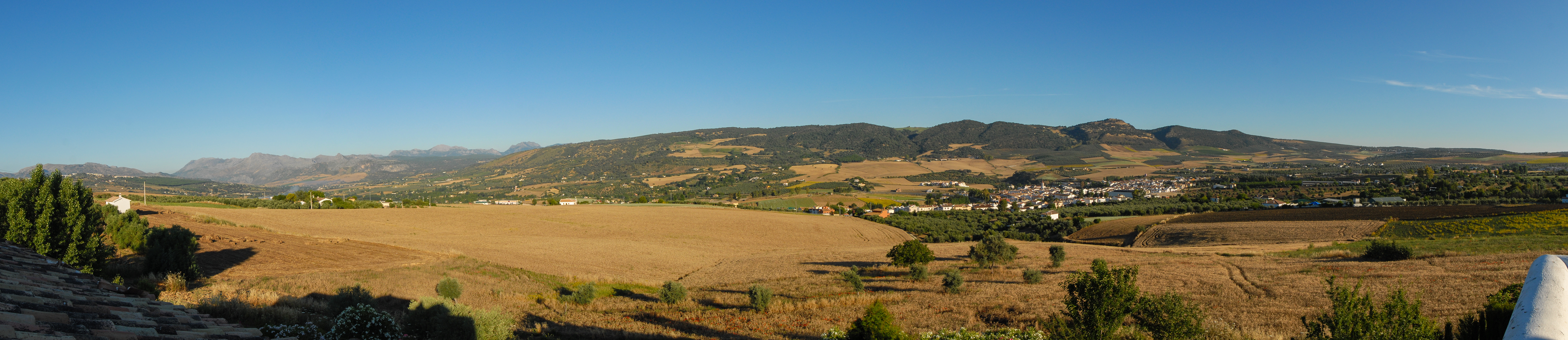
Panoramic view of Arriate

== See also ==
- List of municipalities in Málaga
