= Pujerra =

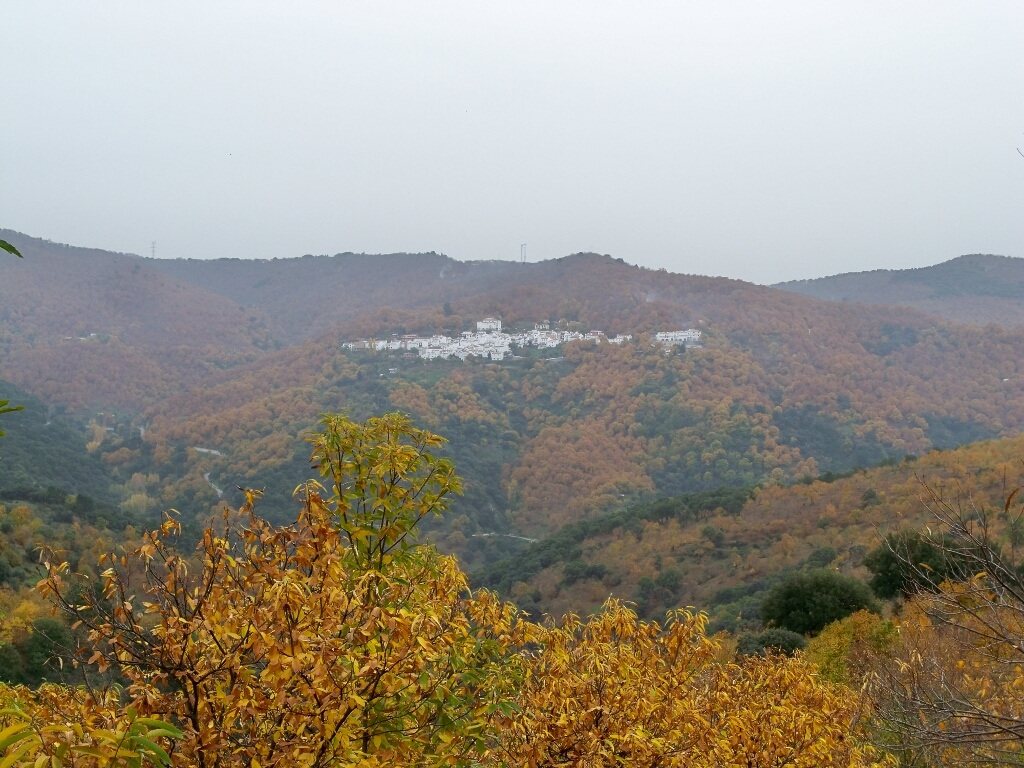
- Diatant view of Pujerra, Málaga, Spain

- Coat of arms

- Location in Spain.
- Coordinates: 36°37′N 5°08′W
- Sovereign state: Spain
- Autonomous community: Andalusia
- Province: Málaga

Area
  - Total: 24 km^{2} (9.3 sq mi)
- Elevation: 775 m (2,543 ft)

Population (2025-01-01)
  - Total: 285
  - Density: 12/km^{2} (31/sq mi)
- Time zone: UTC+1 (CET)
  - Summer (DST): UTC+2 (CEST)

Pujerra is a town and municipality in the province of Málaga, part of the autonomous community of Andalusia in southern Spain. It is located in the east of the province in the Valle del Genal. Pujerra belongs to the comarca of Serranía de Ronda. The municipality is situated approximately 116 kilometres from the provincial capital of Málaga. It has a population of approximately 350 residents. The natives are called Pujerreños.

== See also ==
- List of municipalities in Málaga
