= Igualeja =

- Municipality
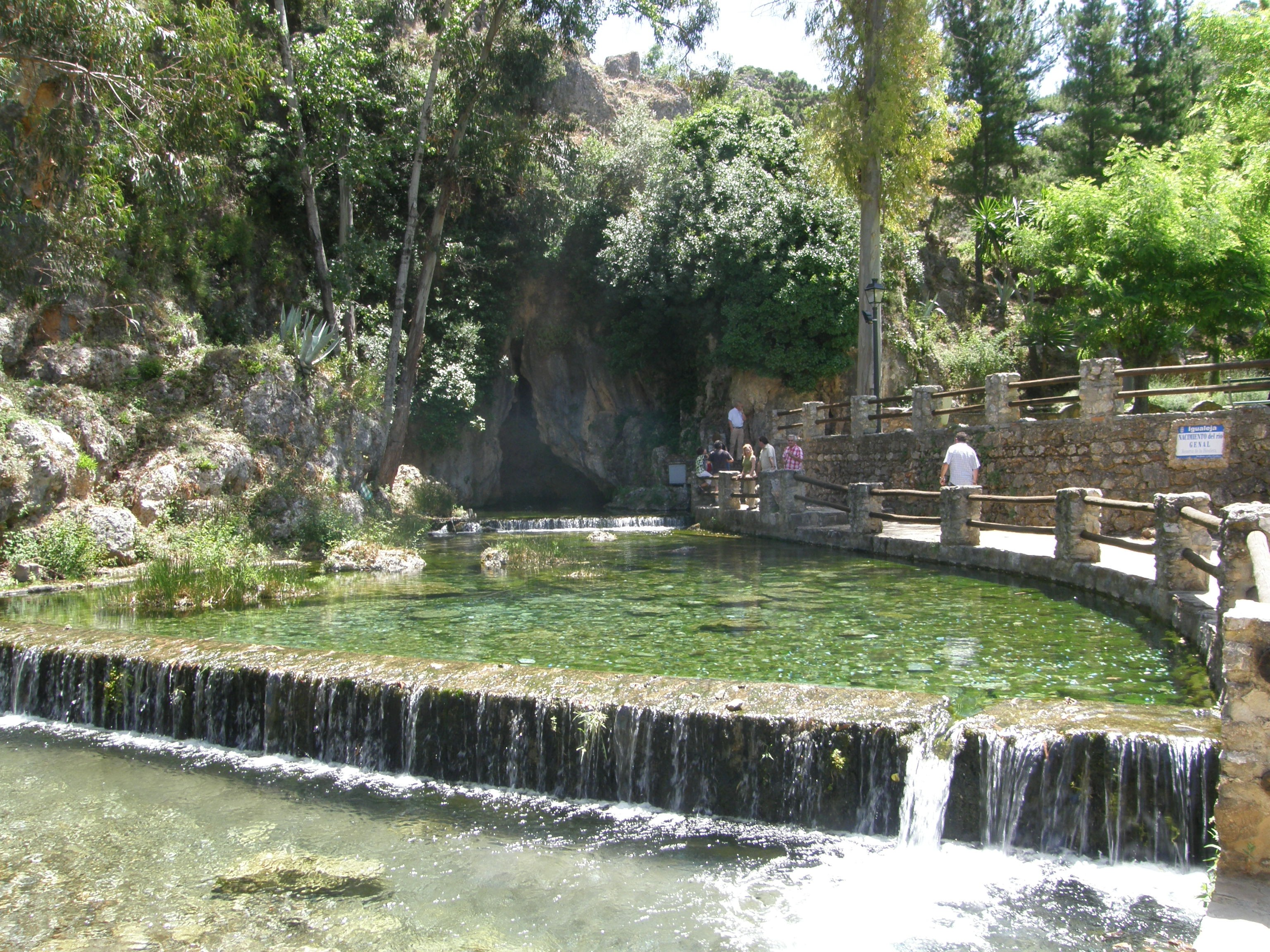

- Coat of arms

- Location in Spain
- Coordinates: 36°38′N 05°07′W
- Country: Spain
- Autonomous community: Andalusia
- Province: Málaga
- Comarca: Serrania de Ronda

Government
  - Mayor: Francisco R. Escalona Macías (PP)

Area
  - Total: 44 km^{2} (17 sq mi)
- Elevation: 706 m (2,316 ft)

Population (2025-01-01)
  - Total: 733
  - Density: 17/km^{2} (43/sq mi)
- Demonym: Igualejeños
- Time zone: UTC+1 (CET)
  - Summer (DST): UTC+2 (CEST)
- Website: Official website

Igualeja is a town and municipality in the province of Málaga, part of the autonomous community of Andalusia in southern Spain. It is situated in the west of province in Valle del Genal. It belongs to the comarca of Serranía de Ronda. The municipality is situated approximately 20 kilometers from Ronda and 142 kilometres from the city of Málaga. It has a population of approximately 1,000 residents.

== See also ==
- List of municipalities in Málaga
