= Jimera de Líbar =

Town and municipality in Málaga, Spain

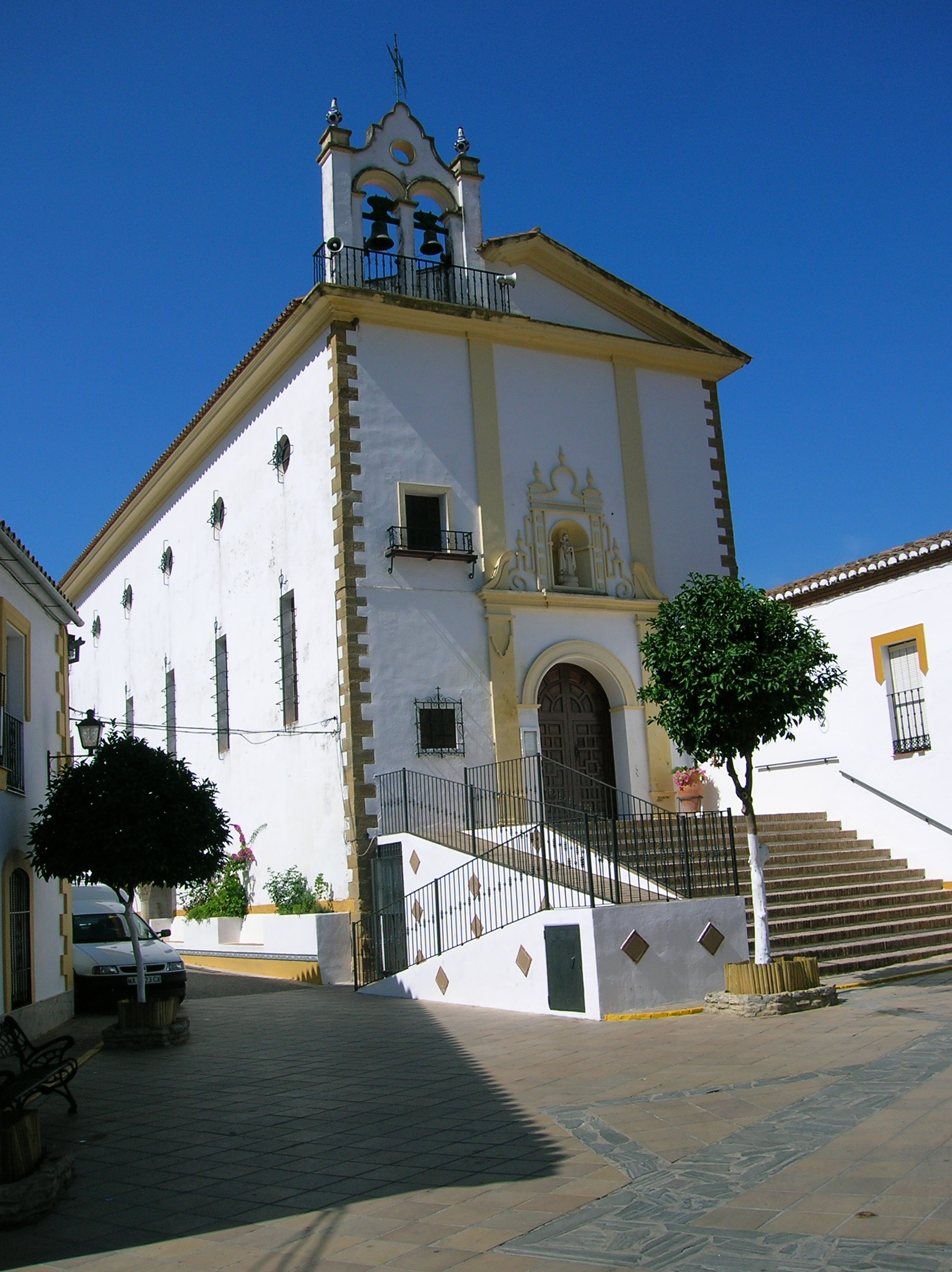
- Church of Our Lady of el Rosario, Jimera de Líbar, Spain.

- Coat of arms

- Location in Spain.
- Coordinates: 36°39′N 5°16′W
- Sovereign state: Spain
- Autonomous community: Andalusia
- Province: Málaga

Area
  - Total: 27 km^{2} (10 sq mi)
- Elevation: 507 m (1,663 ft)

Population (2025-01-01)
  - Total: 399
  - Density: 15/km^{2} (38/sq mi)
- Time zone: UTC+1 (CET)
  - Summer (DST): UTC+2 (CEST)
- Website: www.jimeradelibar.es

Jimera de Líbar is a town and municipality in the province of Málaga, part of the autonomous community of Andalusia in southern Spain. The municipality is situated approximately 26 kilometres from Ronda and sits at an altitude of 540 metres. It is located in the west of the province. It belongs to the comarca of Serranía de Ronda. It has a population of approximately 450 residents. The natives are called Jimeranos.

The village is quiet and has an elderly population, whilst the train station delivers plenty of weekend visitors. 4 trains from each direction stop here every day. The train station was built in a typical English style.

== See also ==
- List of municipalities in Málaga
