= Algatocín =

- Municipality
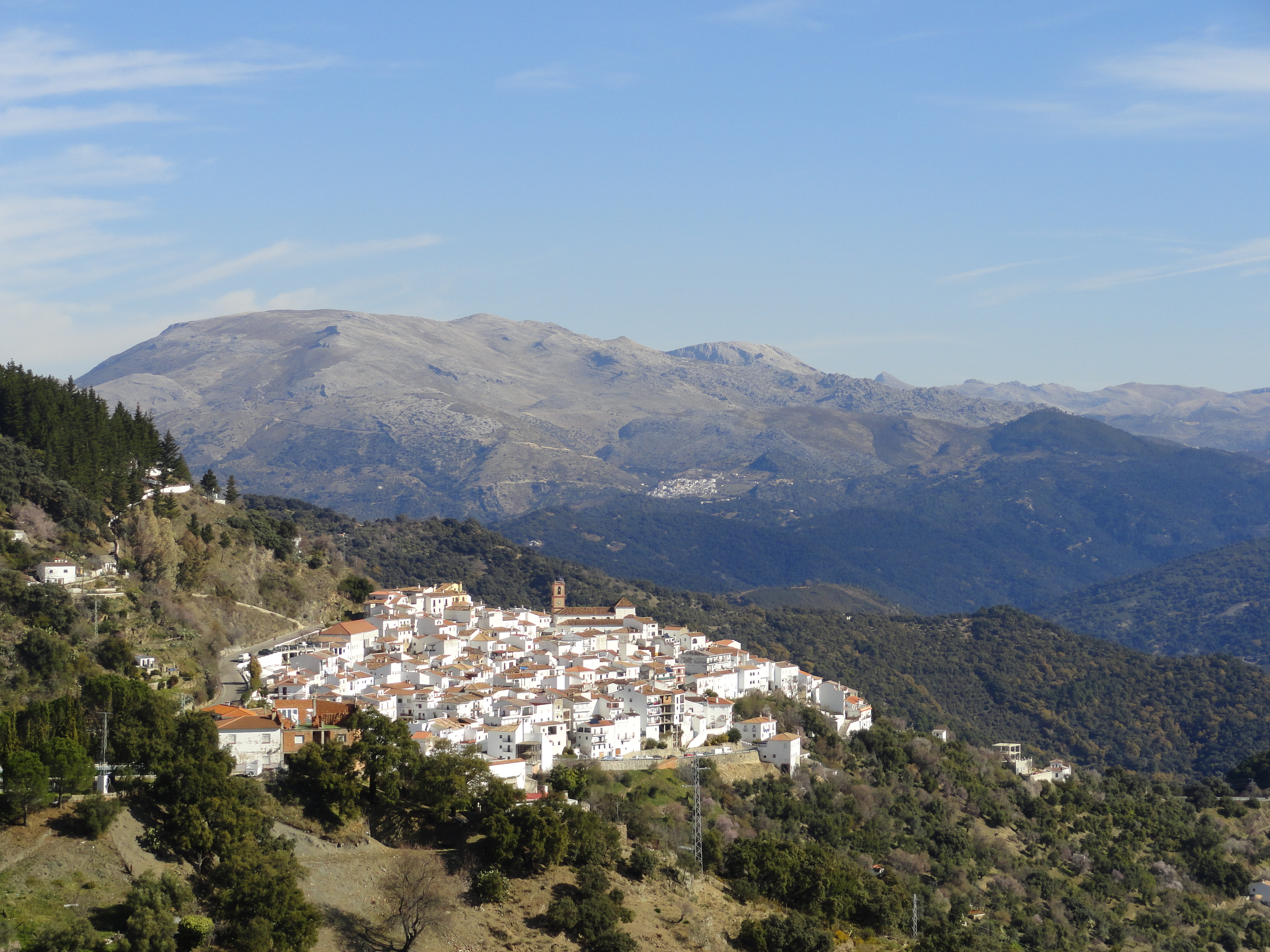

- Flag Coat of arms

- Municipal location in the Province of Málaga

- Location in Spain
- Coordinates: 36°34′22″N 5°16′32″W
- Sovereign state: Spain
- Autonomous community: Andalusia
- Province: Málaga
- Comarca: Serranía de Ronda

Government
  - Mayor: Benito Carrillo Martínez

Area
  - Total: 20 km^{2} (7.7 sq mi)
- Elevation: 725 m (2,379 ft)

Population (2025-01-01)
  - Total: 816
  - Density: 41/km^{2} (110/sq mi)
- Time zone: UTC+1 (CET)
  - Summer (DST): UTC+2 (CEST)
- Website: Official website

Algatocín is a town and municipality in the province of Málaga, part of the autonomous community of Andalusia in southern Spain. The municipality is situated approximately 143 kilometres (89 mi) from Málaga and 30 kilometres (19 mi) from Ronda. It is located in the west of the province in the Valle del Genal, being one of the towns that make up the comarca of the Serrania de Ronda. It is situated at an altitude of 725 metres (2,379 ft). The town has a population of approximately 900 residents, over a surface area of 20 square kilometres (7.7 sq mi), for a population density of 47 inhabitants per square kilometre (120/sq mi).

== Geography ==
=== Location ===
Algatocín lies in the middle of the Valle del Bajo Genal. It extends from the mountains to the river banks of the Genal, and is full of hills and vegetation.

=== Flora and fauna ===
The municipality shares similar characteristics in terms of flora and fauna with the rest of the Valle del Genal. Highlighting some of them are:

==== Flora ====
- Algerian oak (Quercus canariensis)
- Cork oak (Quercus suber)
- Strawberry tree (Arbutus unedo)
- Chestnut (Castanea sativa)
- Aleppo pine (Pinus halepensis)
- Mastic tree (Pistacia lentiscus)
- Fern (Davallia canariensis)
- Gorse
- Heather

==== Mammals ====
- Wild boar (Sus scrofa)
- Red fox (Vulpes vulpes)
- European rabbit (Oryctolagus cuniculus)
- Common genet (Genetta genetta)
- Egyptian mongoose (Herpestes ichneumon)

==== Birds ====
- Common kestrel (Falco tinnunculus)
- Eurasian sparrowhawk (Accipiter nisus)
- Booted eagle (Hieraaetus pennatus)
- Common cuckoo (Cuculus canorus)
- European robin (Erithacus rubecula)
- Common nightingale (Luscinia megarhynchos)

== History ==
=== Antiquity and the Middle Ages ===
The earliest evidence of human settlement in the lands of the present municipality of Algatocín go back to the Bronze Age as pottery was found in Cerro Gordo. In this same place, around 1,000 BC, the remains of an Iberian oppidum or defensive enclosure have been found. Later, during Roman rule, and in Cerro Gordo as well, seemed to emerge a major city called Vesci and a Roman road nearby.

== See also ==
- List of municipalities in Málaga
