= Benadalid =

- Municipality
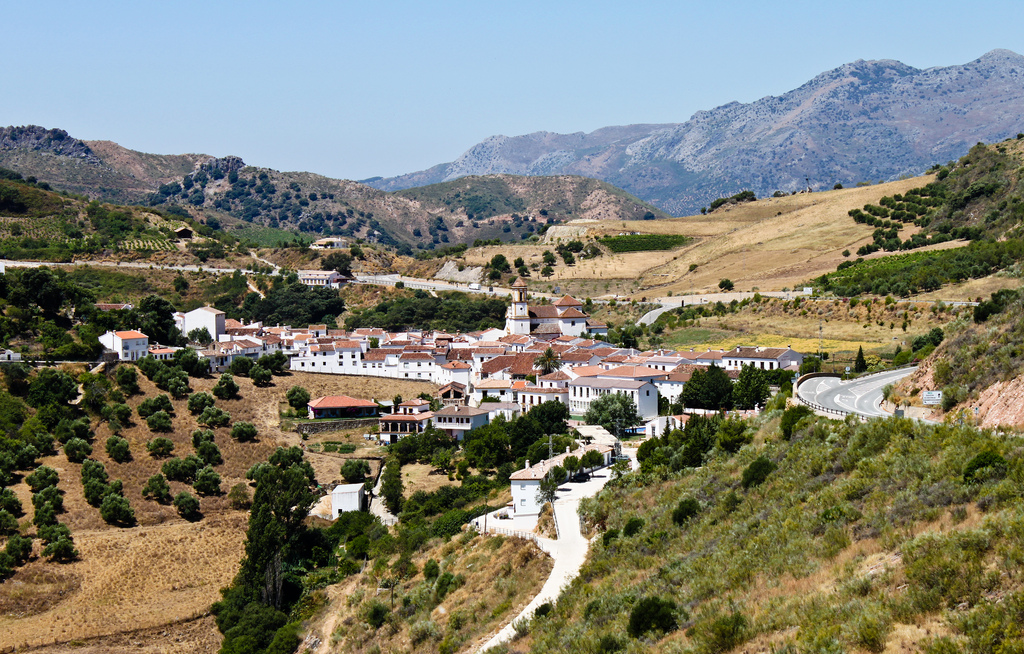

- Coat of arms

- Municipal location in the Province of Málaga

- Location in Spain
- Coordinates: 36°36′23″N 5°16′09″W
- Sovereign state: Spain
- Autonomous community: Andalusia
- Province: Málaga
- Comarca: Serranía de Ronda

Government
  - Mayor: Leonor Andrade Perales (PSOE)

Area
  - Total: 20 km^{2} (7.7 sq mi)
- Elevation: 700 m (2,300 ft)

Population (2025-01-01)
  - Total: 226
  - Density: 11/km^{2} (29/sq mi)
- Time zone: UTC+1 (CET)
  - Summer (DST): UTC+2 (CEST)
- Postal code: 29493
- Website: www.benadalid.es

Benadalid is a town and municipality in the province of Málaga, part of the autonomous community of Andalusia in southern Spain. The municipality is situated approximately 25 kilometres from Ronda and 145 from the provincial capital. It has a population of approximately 258 residents. The natives are called Benalizos.

== See also ==
- List of municipalities in Málaga
