= Montecorto =

- Municipality
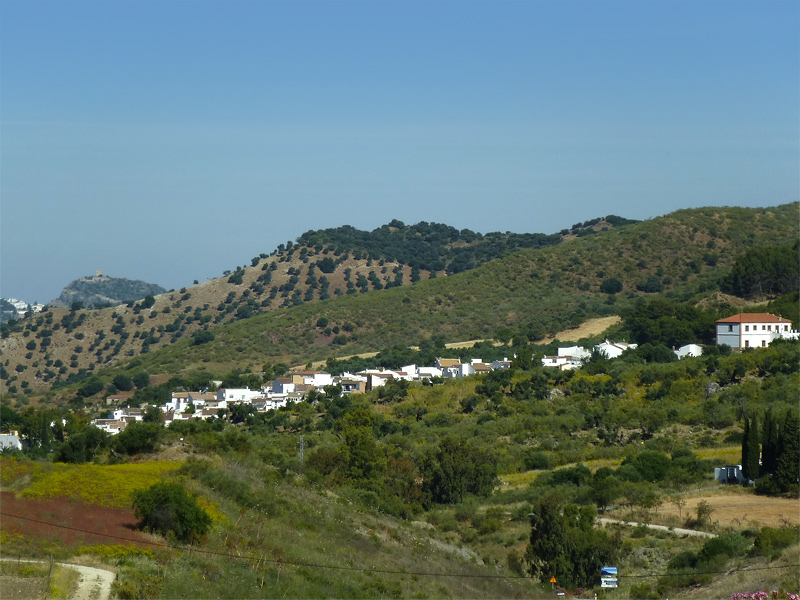

- Flag Coat of arms

- Municipal location in the Province of Málaga

- Location in Spain Montecorto (Andalusia) Montecorto (Spain)
- Coordinates: 36°48′55″N 5°17′48″W
- Country: Spain
- Community: Andalusia
- Province: Málaga
- Comarca: Serranía de Ronda

Government
  - Mayor: Miguel Ayala (PA)

Area
  - Total: 48.05 km^{2} (18.55 sq mi)
- Elevation: 500 m (1,600 ft)

Population (2018)
  - Total: 585
  - Density: 12.2/km^{2} (31.5/sq mi)
- Demonym(s): Montecorteño, -ña
- Time zone: UTC+1 (CET)
  - Summer (DST): UTC+2 (CEST)
- Postal code: 29430
- Website: www.montecorto.es

Montecorto is a town and municipality in the province of Málaga, part of the autonomous community of Andalusia in southern Spain. It was separated from the municipality of Ronda on 17 October 2014. Montecorto is the antipode of the town of Birkenhead and Chatswood in Auckland, New Zealand.

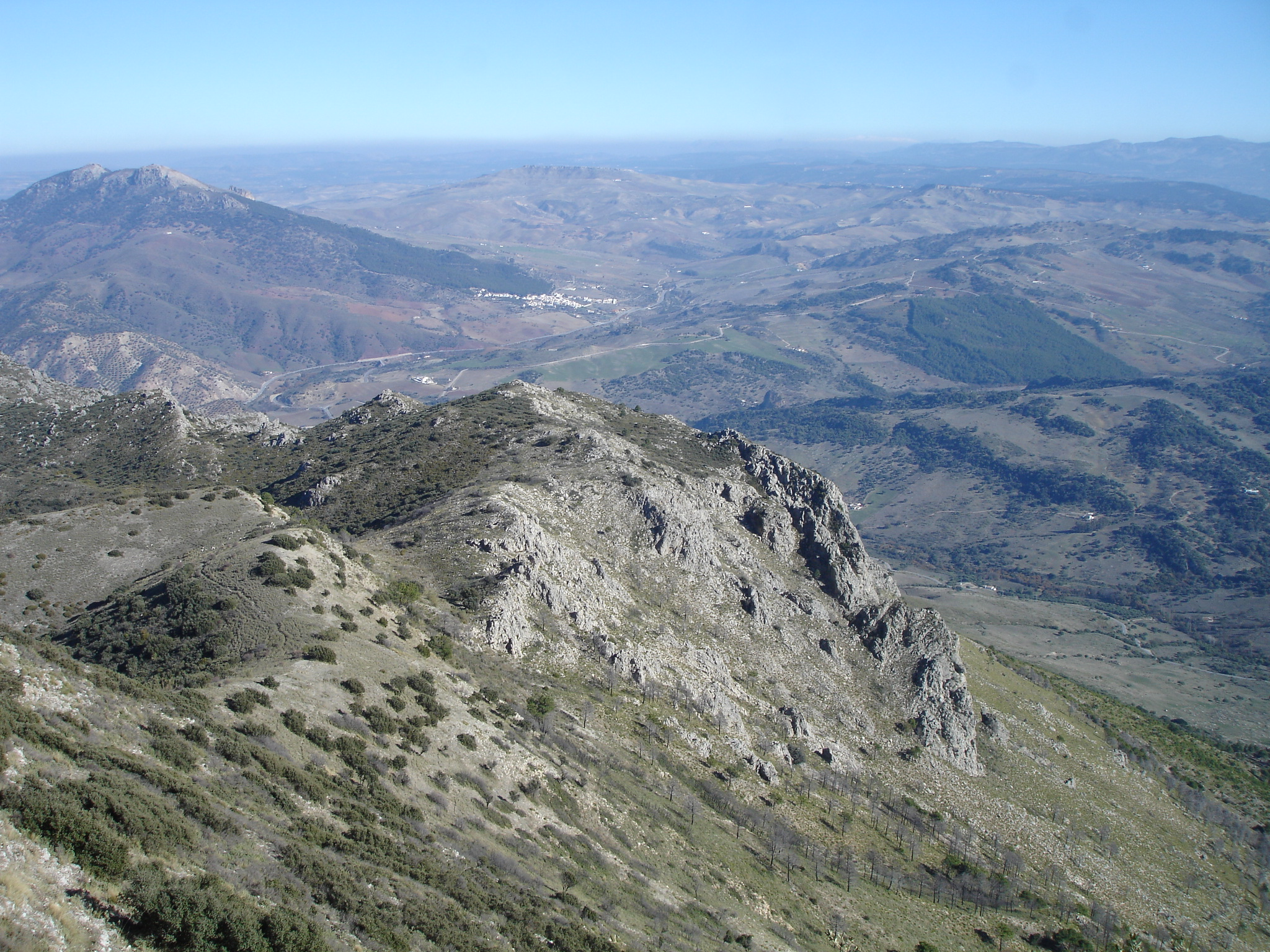
View of Montecorto from Cerro Coros on the Puerto de las Palomas

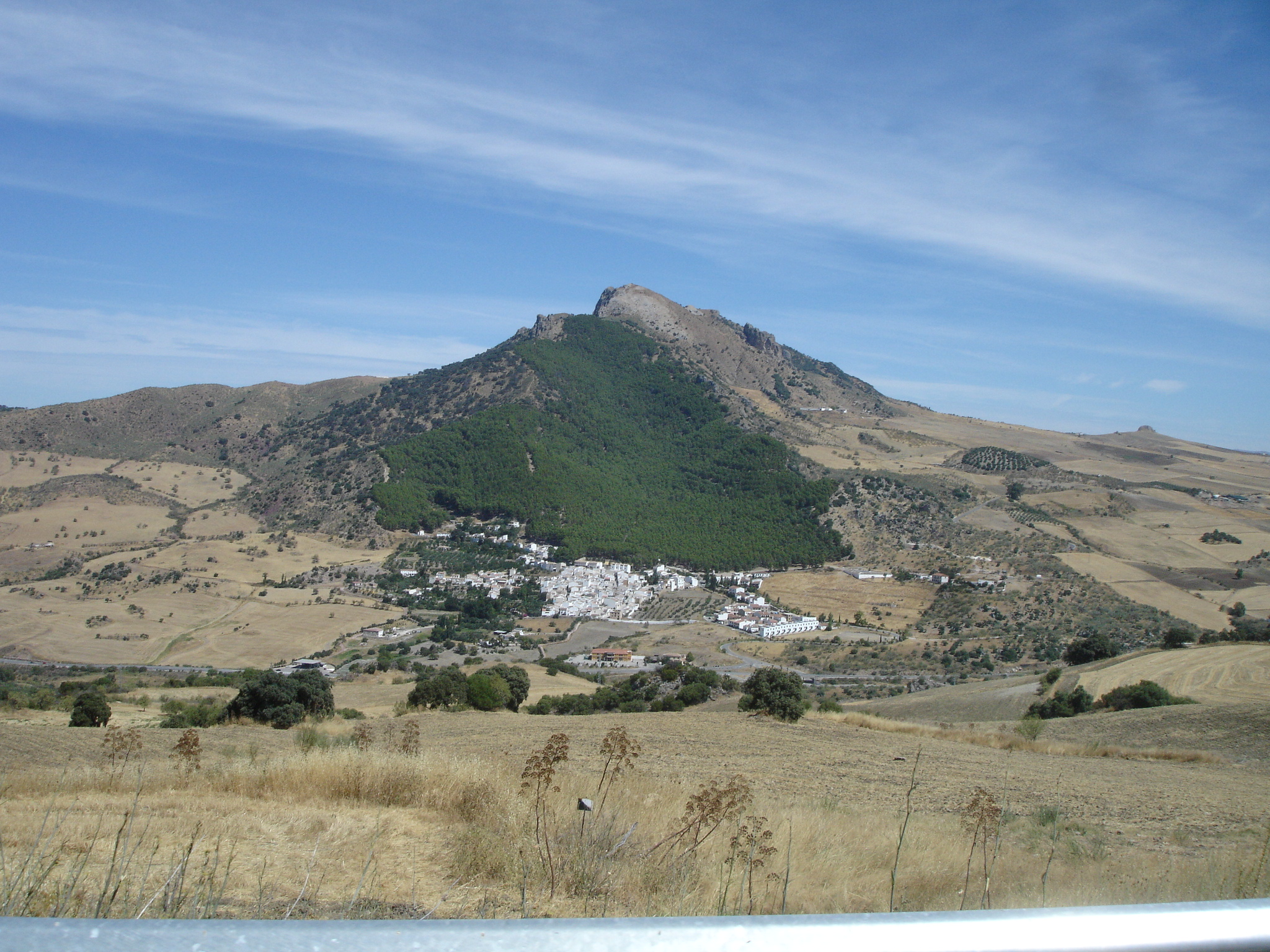

== See also ==
- List of municipalities in Málaga
