= Benalauría =

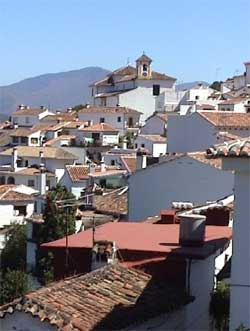

- Flag Coat of arms

- Location in Spain.
- Coordinates: 36°35′N 5°15′W
- Sovereign state: Spain
- Autonomous community: Andalusia
- Province: Málaga

Area
  - Total: 19.75 km^{2} (7.63 sq mi)
- Elevation: 667 m (2,188 ft)

Population (2025-01-01)
  - Total: 460
  - Density: 23/km^{2} (60/sq mi)
- Time zone: UTC+1 (CET)
  - Summer (DST): UTC+2 (CEST)
- Website: www.benalauria.es

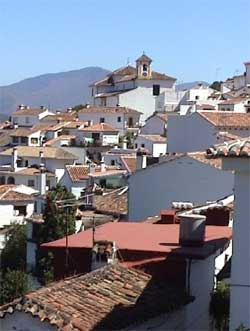
Benalauría, Málaga

Benalauría is a town and municipality in the province of Málaga, part of the autonomous community of Andalusia in southern Spain. The municipality is situated approximately 30 kilometres from Ronda and 143 from the city of Málaga. It has a population of approximately 500 residents. The natives are called Jabatos.

== See also ==
- List of municipalities in Málaga
