= Benarrabá =

Benarraba
- City
- Benarrabá
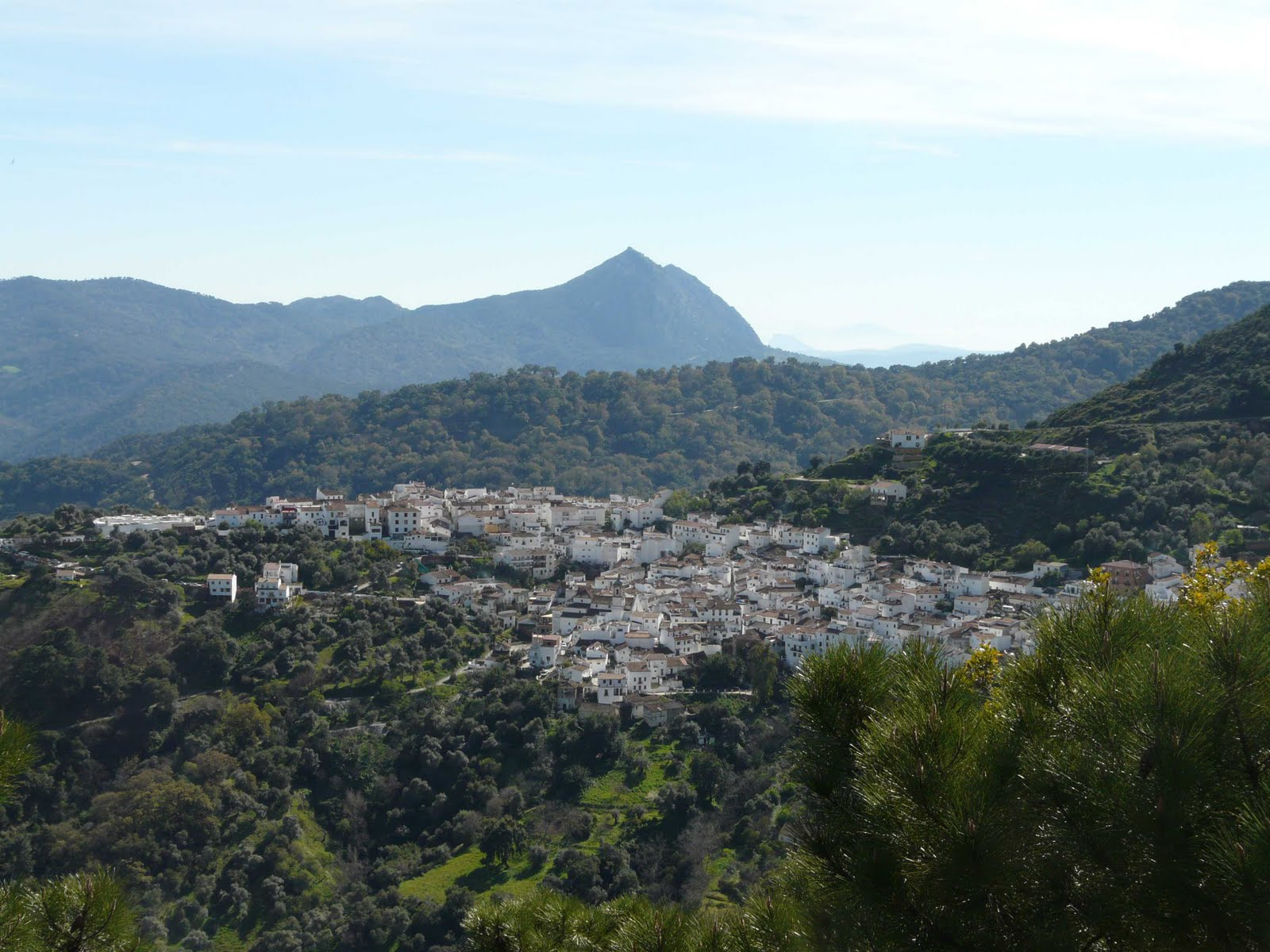

- Coat of arms

- Location within Spain
- Coordinates: 36°33′04″N 5°16′34″W
- Sovereign state: Spain
- Autonomous community: Andalusia
- Province: Málaga

Area
  - Total: 26.20 km^{2} (10.12 sq mi)
- Elevation: 481 m (1,578 ft)

Population (2025-01-01)
  - Total: 457
  - Density: 17.4/km^{2} (45.2/sq mi)
- Time zone: UTC+1
  - Summer (DST): +2
- Website: www.benarraba.com

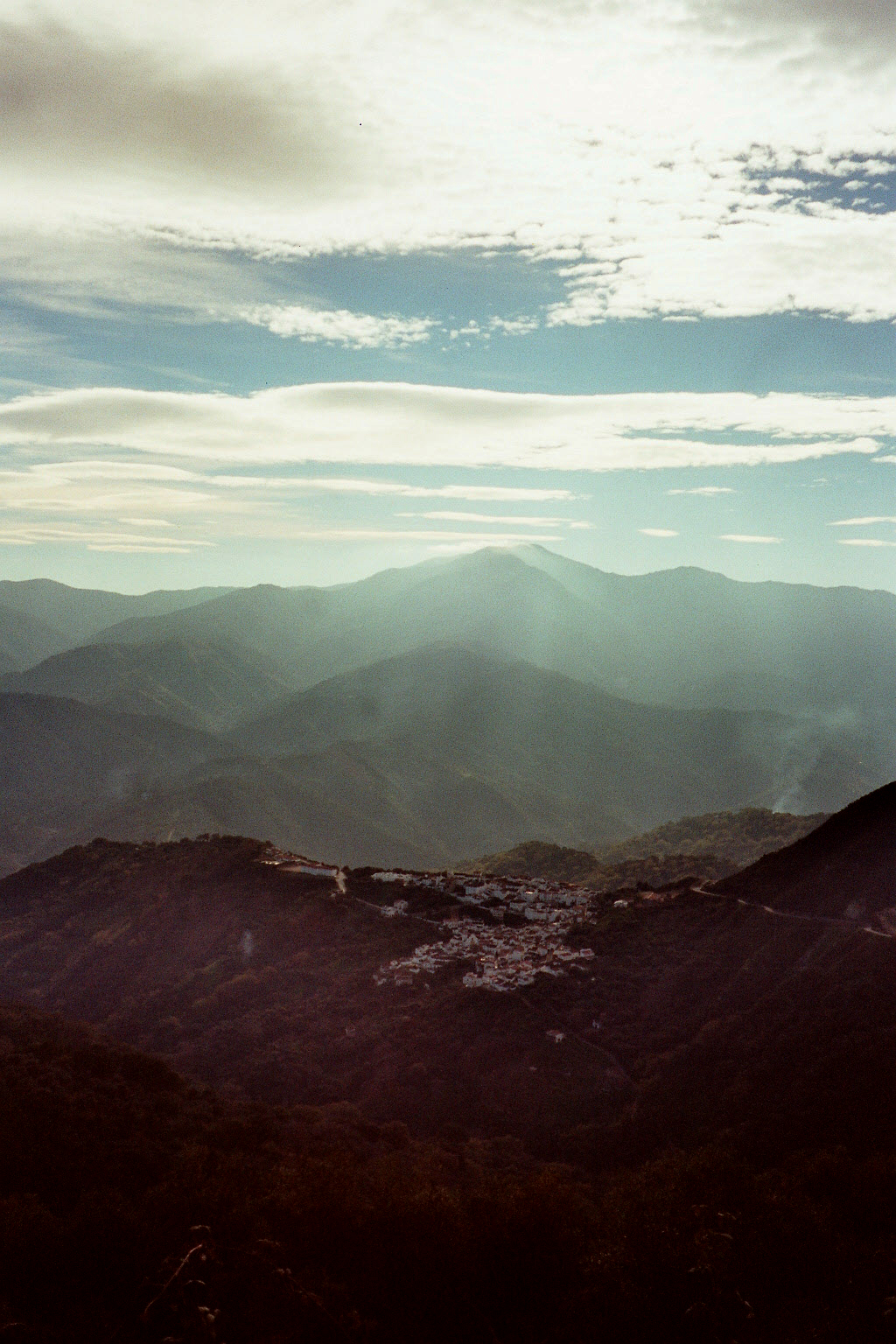
Benarrabá viewed from Alagtocin (1996).

Benarrabá is a town and municipality in the province of Málaga, part of the autonomous community of Andalusia in southern Spain. The municipality is situated approximately 157 kilometres (98 mi) from the city of Málaga and 37 kilometres (23 mi) from Ronda. It has a population of approximately 600 residents. The natives are called Benarrabiches.

== See also ==
- List of municipalities in Málaga
