= Parauta =

Town in Andalusia, Spain

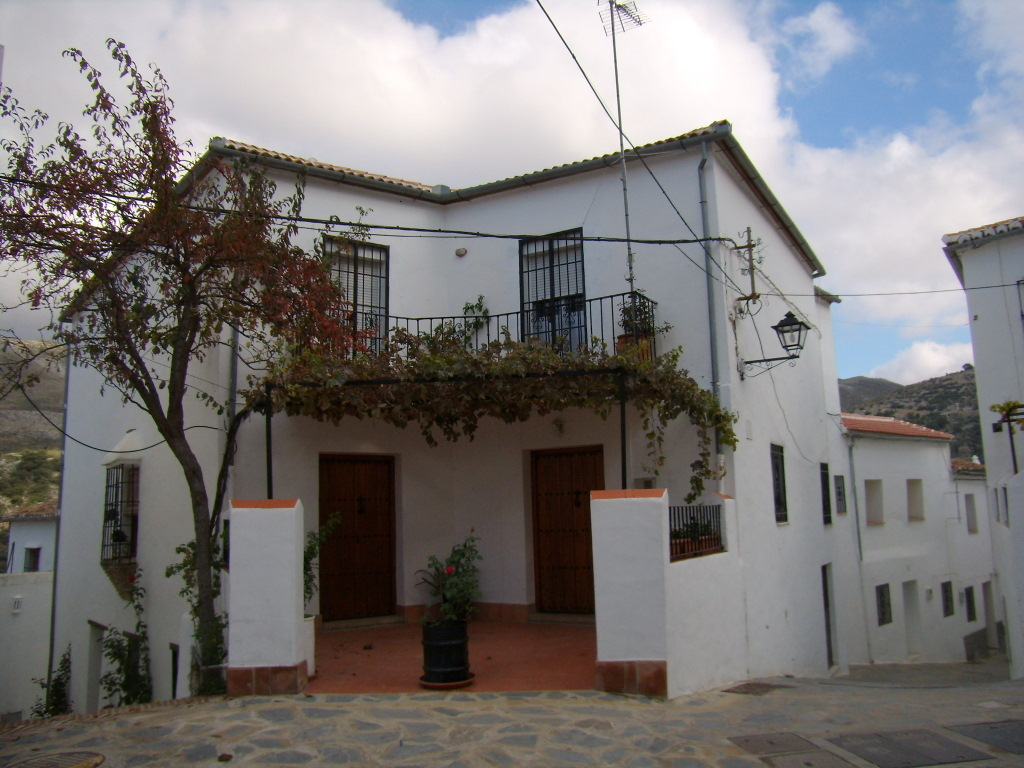

- Location in Spain.
- Coordinates: 36°39′N 5°07′W
- Sovereign state: Spain
- Autonomous community: Andalusia
- Province: Málaga

Area
  - Total: 44 km^{2} (17 sq mi)
- Elevation: 799 m (2,621 ft)

Population (2025-01-01)
  - Total: 271
  - Density: 6.2/km^{2} (16/sq mi)
- Time zone: UTC+1 (CET)
  - Summer (DST): UTC+2 (CEST)
- Website: www.parauta.es

Parauta is a town and municipality in the province of Málaga, part of the autonomous community of Andalusia in southern Spain. It belongs to the comarca of Serranía de Ronda. It is situated in the west of the province in the Valle del Genal. The municipality is situated approximately 105 kilometres from the provincial capital of Málaga. It has a population of approximately 250 residents. The natives are called Parauteños.

This white-painted town is known for its hiking trails, especially "El Bosque Encantado" trail.

== See also ==
- List of municipalities in Málaga
