= Jubrique =

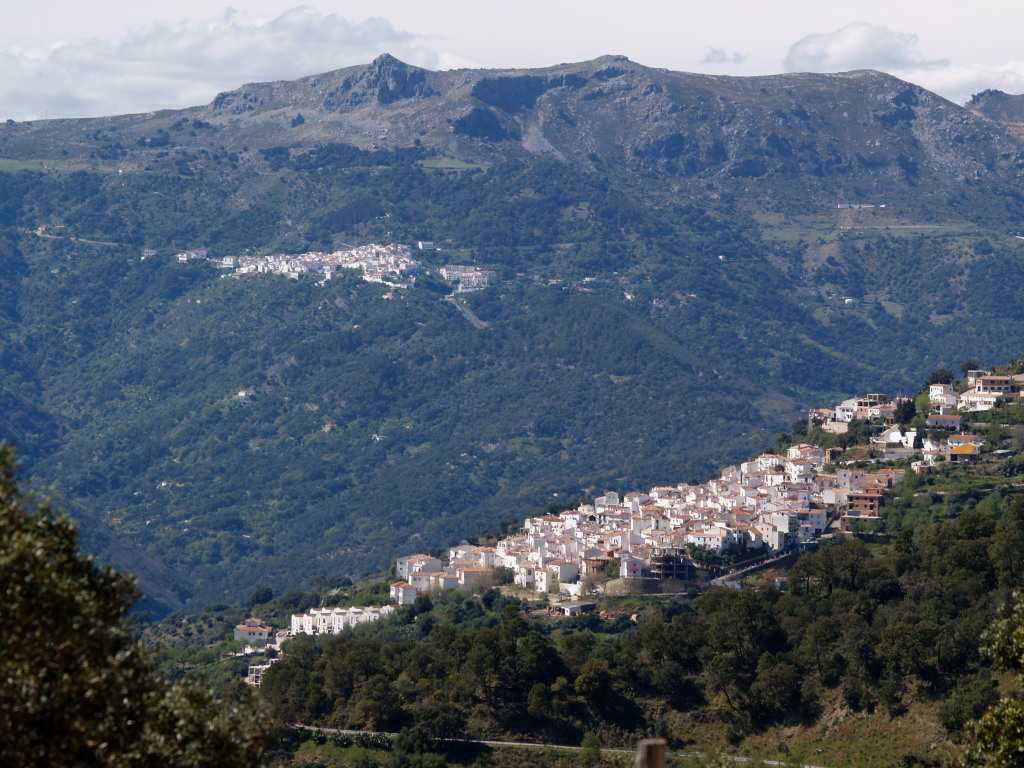
- Jubrique (foreground) and Algatocín (background)

- Location in Spain.
- Coordinates: 36°34′N 5°13′W
- Sovereign state: Spain
- Autonomous community: Andalusia
- Province: Málaga

Area
  - Total: 39 km^{2} (15 sq mi)
- Elevation: 558 m (1,831 ft)

Population (2025-01-01)
  - Total: 585
  - Density: 15/km^{2} (39/sq mi)
- Time zone: UTC+1 (CET)
  - Summer (DST): UTC+2 (CEST)
- Website: www.jubrique.org

Jubrique is a town and municipality in the province of Málaga, part of the autonomous community of Andalusia in southern Spain. The municipality is situated approximately 38 kilometers from Ronda and 105 km from the Malaga capital. It has a population of approximately 800 residents. The natives in this village are called Jubriqueños.

== See also ==
- List of municipalities in Málaga
