= Cuevas del Becerro =

- Municipality
- Coat of arms

- Location in Spain
- Coordinates: 36°52′N 5°02′W
- Country: Spain
- Autonomous community: Andalusia
- Province: Málaga
- Comarca: Serrania de Ronda, Guadalteba

Government
  - Type: (PSOE)
  - Mayor: Joaquín Esquina

Area
  - Total: 16 km^{2} (6.2 sq mi)
- Elevation: 724 m (2,375 ft)

Population (2025-01-01)
  - Total: 1,617
  - Density: 100/km^{2} (260/sq mi)
- Demonym: Cueveños
- Time zone: UTC+1 (CET)
  - Summer (DST): UTC+2 (CEST)
- Website: Official website

Cuevas del Becerro is a town and municipality in the province of Málaga, part of the autonomous community of Andalusia in southern Spain. The municipality is situated approximately 20 kilometers from Ronda and 105 km from the city of Málaga. By road it is located 576 km from Madrid. In 2008 it had a population of 1,847 inhabitants according to the INE.

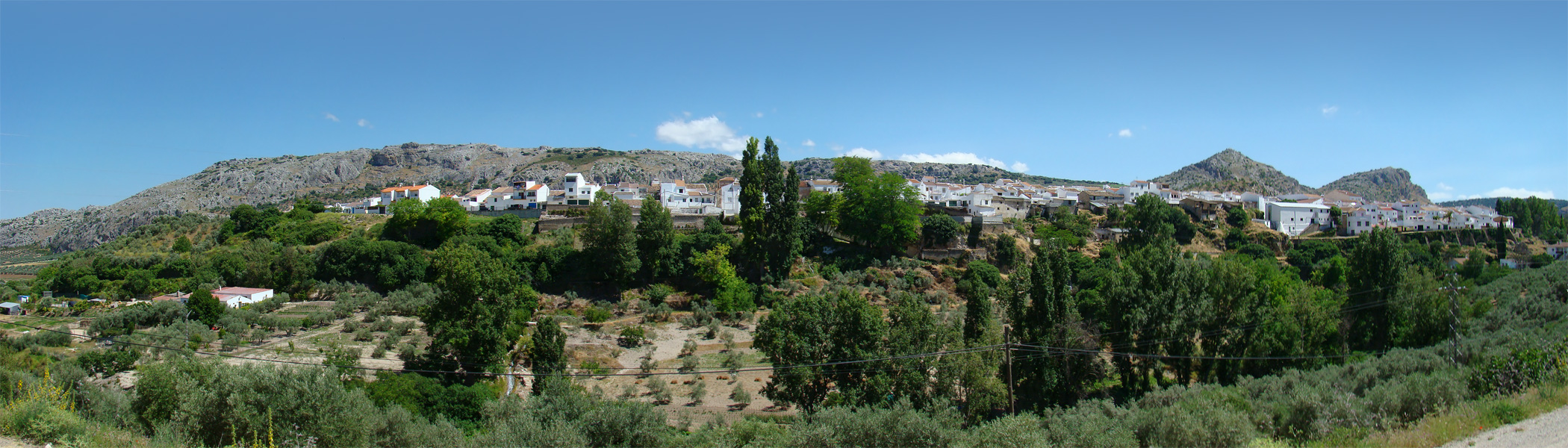
View of Cuevas del Becerro from the A367

== Origin of name ==
Legend has it that the town gets its name from a golden calf that they found in one of its caves, which are currently located on the northern side of the village on the river of the caves. One researcher believes that these caves were used to house sires, where locals brought their cows for cover. This scenario could also be the origin of the name. Everything up until now is mere speculation on the possible origin.

== Places of interest ==
- Church of San Antonio Abad, (Cuevas del Becerro)
- Cave of Moro, (Cuevas del Becerro)
- Fountain of Nacimiento
- Roman stoves
- Passage of Rio Carrizal

== Politics and administration ==
The political administration of the municipality is carried out through a democratically controlled city council whose members are elected every four years by universal suffrage. The electoral census is composed of all registered residents in the town over 18 and a Spanish national and other member states of the European Union. Pursuant to the Law on the General Election, which sets the number of eligible councilors depending on the population of the municipality, the Municipal Corporation of Cuevas del Becerro consists of 9 councilors.

== See also ==
- List of municipalities in Málaga
