= Faraján =

Coordinates: 36.617°N 5.183°W

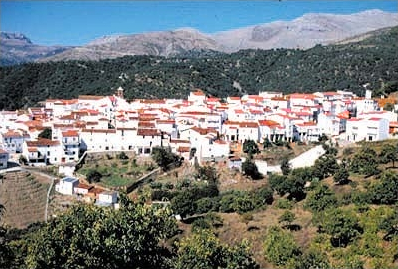
- View of Faraján

- Flag Coat of arms

- Location in Spain.
- Country: Spain
- Autonomous community: Andalusia

Area
  - Total: 20.41 km^{2} (7.88 sq mi)
- Elevation: 645 m (2,116 ft)

Population (2025-01-01)
  - Total: 285
  - Density: 14.0/km^{2} (36.2/sq mi)
- Time zone: UTC+1 (CET)
  - Summer (DST): UTC+2 (CEST)
- Website: www.farajan.com

Faraján (Spanish pronunciation: [faɾaˈxan]) is a town and municipality in the province of Málaga, part of the autonomous community of Andalusia in southern Spain. The municipality is situated approximately 25 kilometers from Ronda and 144 km from the city of Málaga. It is located west of Málaga in the Genal valley. It is one of the towns that make up the comarca of the Serranía de Ronda.

It has a population of approximately 300 residents. The natives are called Farajeños or Celestotes.

== See also ==
- List of municipalities in Málaga
