= Cartajima =

- Municipality
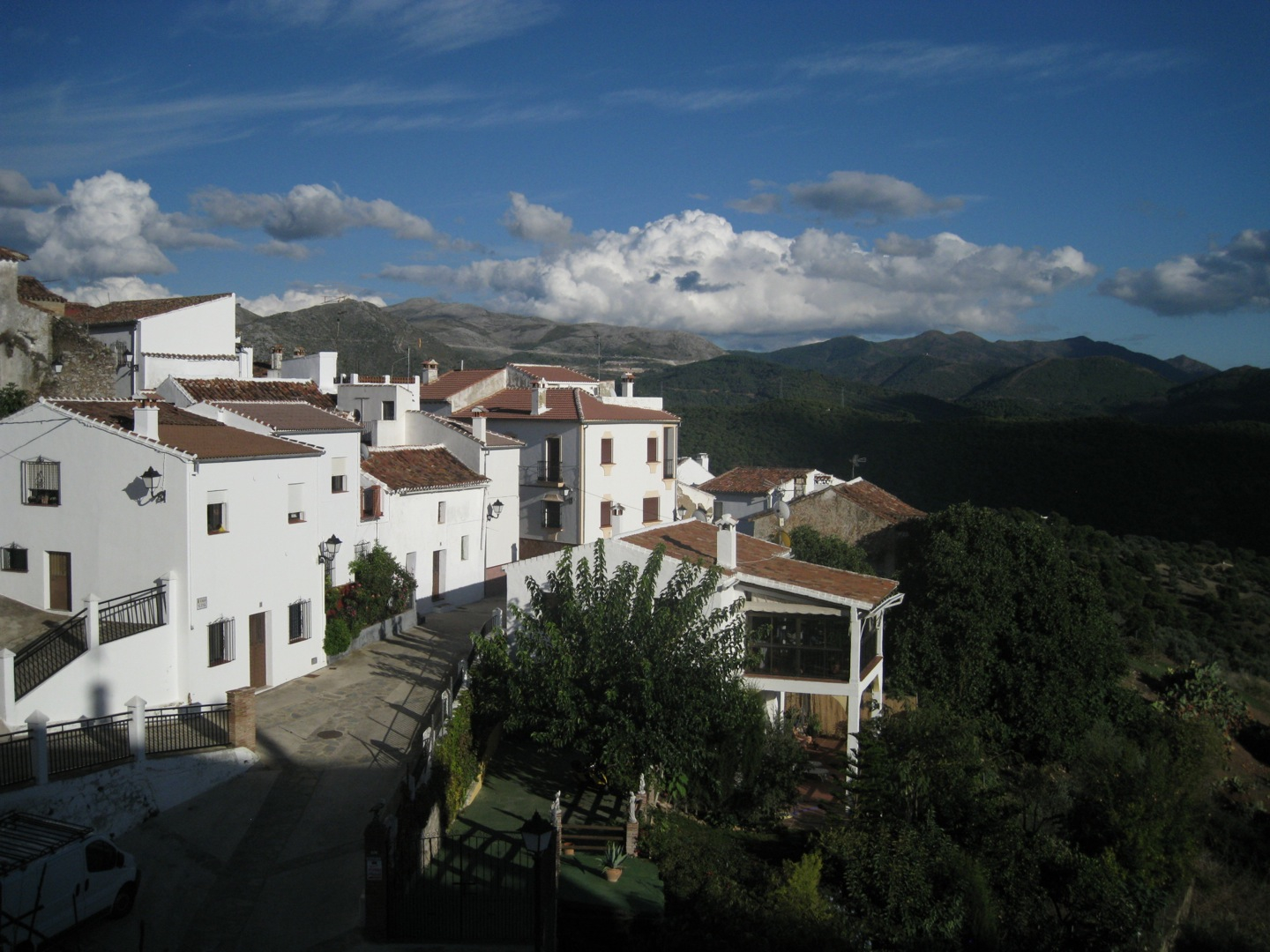

- Flag Coat of arms

- Location within Spain Location within Andalusia
- Coordinates: 36°38′44″N 5°09′15″W
- Country: Spain
- Autonomous community: Andalusia
- Province: Málaga

Government
  - Mayor: Francisco Javier Benítez Tirado

Area
  - Total: 22 km^{2} (8.5 sq mi)
- Elevation: 826 m (2,710 ft)

Population (2025-01-01)
  - Total: 234
  - Density: 11/km^{2} (28/sq mi)
- Demonym: Cartajimeños
- Time zone: UTC+1 (CET)
  - Summer (DST): UTC+2 (CEST)
- Website: Official website

Cartajima is a small village and municipality of Spain located in the province of Málaga, part of the autonomous community of Andalusia. It is located approximately 17 kilometres from Ronda and 105 km from the provincial capital. It has a total area of 21.47 km^{2} and, as of 2019, a population of 253.

== See also ==
- List of municipalities in Málaga
