= Alpandeire, Spain =

Alpandeire
- Municipality
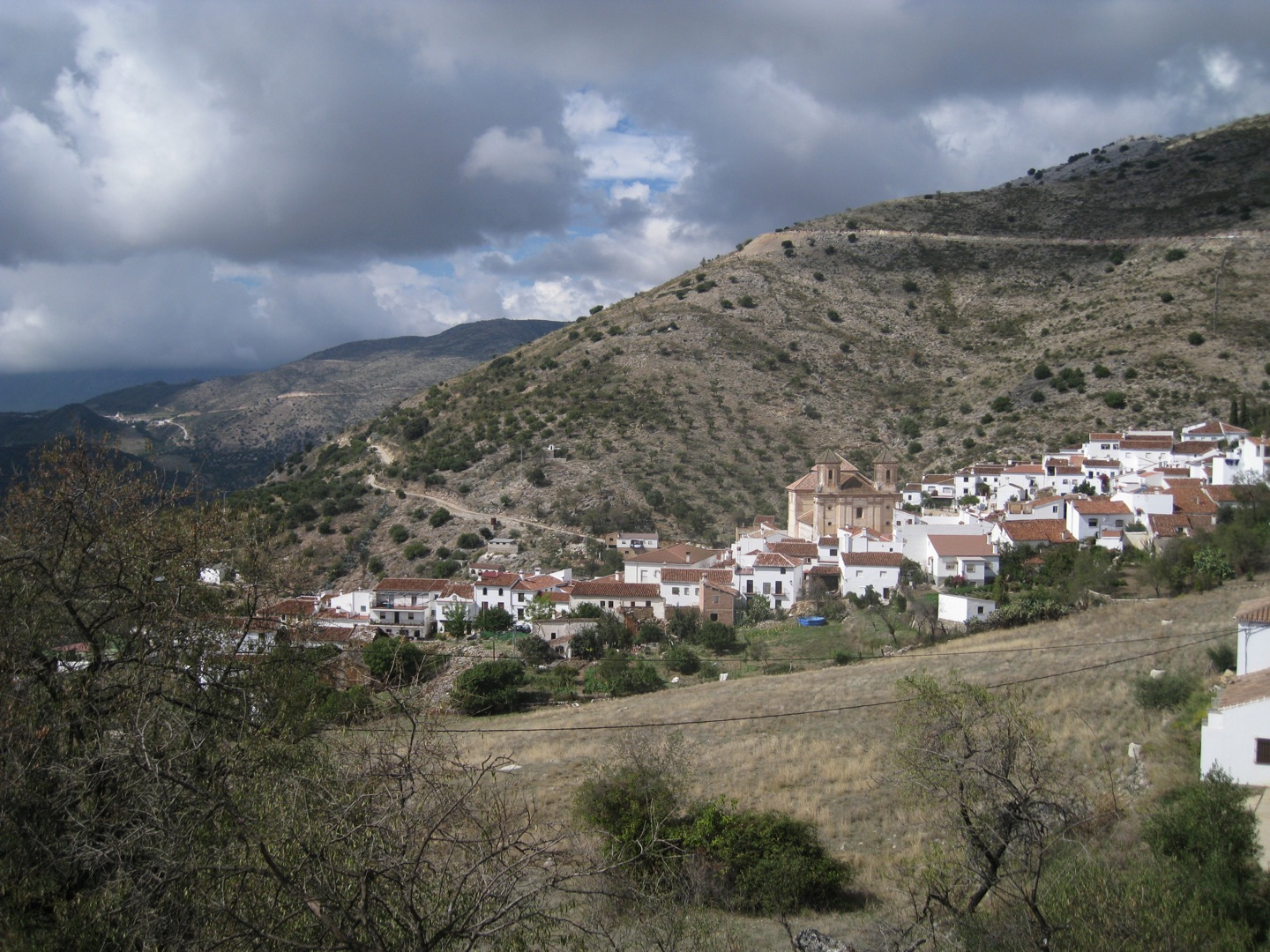

- Coat of arms

- Municipal location in the Province of Málaga

- Location in Spain
- Coordinates: 36°38′04″N 5°12′10″W
- Sovereign state: Spain
- Autonomous community: Andalusia
- Province: Málaga
- Comarca: Serranía de Ronda

Government
  - Mayor: Gabriel Jiménez Ruíz (PSOE)

Area
  - Total: 31.3 km^{2} (12.1 sq mi)
- Elevation: 700 m (2,300 ft)

Population (2025-01-01)
  - Total: 242
  - Density: 7.73/km^{2} (20.0/sq mi)
- Demonym: Panditos
- Time zone: UTC+1 (CET)
  - Summer (DST): UTC+2 (CEST)
- Postal code: 29460
- Website: alpandeire.es

Alpandeire is a Spanish municipality and village located in the Ronda area, near the peak of Jarestepar, (1,421 metres high), and surrounded by rugged scenery. A number of streams run through its territory. The municipality belongs to Málaga province, in the autonomous community of Andalusia.

== History ==
In Moorish times, Alpandeire was a fort built by the Saracens after the battle of Guadalete. It is believed that there were human settlements in Alpandeire in pre-historic times, since burial grounds discovered in the area point right to the Iron and Bronze Ages.

In 1815 Alpandeire obtained the title of Villazgo as an award by Fernando VII for the stubborn resistance of its population during the French occupation.

The "Virgen del Rosario" is the traditional patron saint of Alpandeire.

Place of birth of the blessed Fray Leopoldo, in the present days this locality serves as a pilgrimage site where locals and outsiders pay tribute to the man of "Las tres aves María".

== Demography ==
The municipality has a population of 291 (male: 144, female: 147), an area of 31 km^{2} and a population density of 9.04. Six (5%) of the Alpandeire residents are foreigners.

== Local administration ==
The mayor for the 2023-2027 term is independent Maria Dolores Bullón Ayala.

== See also ==
- List of municipalities in Málaga
