= Genalguacil =

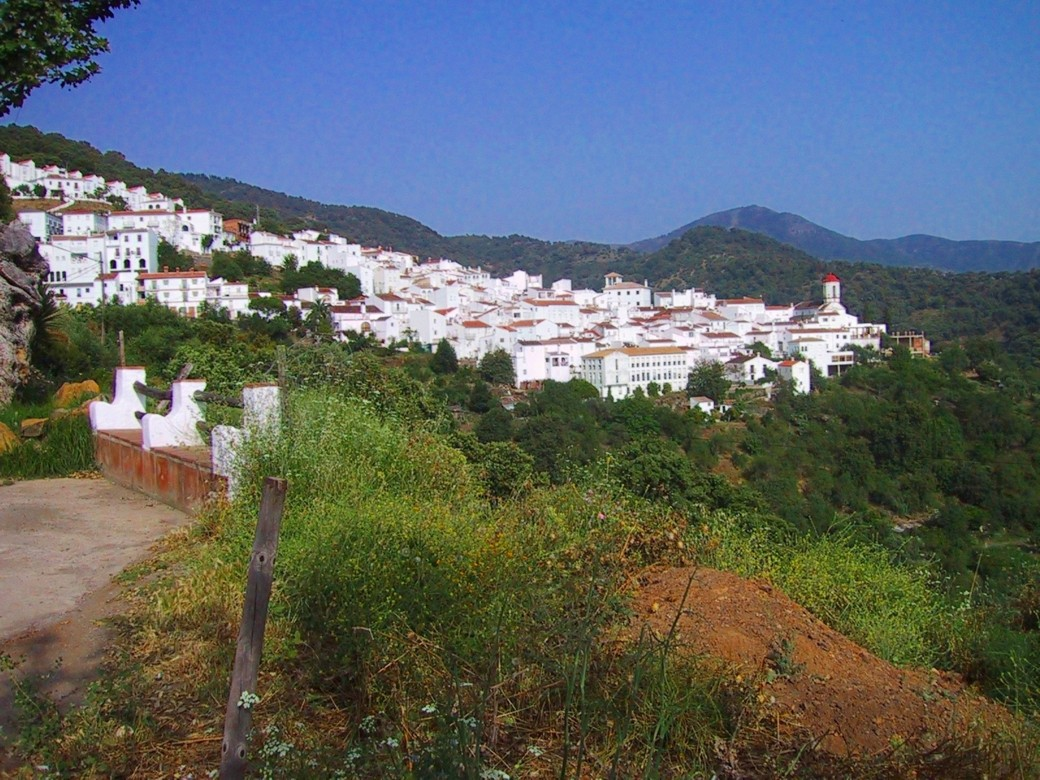
- Panoramic view of Genalguacil

- Flag Coat of arms

- Location in Spain.
- Coordinates: 36°33′N 5°14′W
- Sovereign state: Spain
- Autonomous community: Andalusia
- Province: Málaga

Area
  - Total: 31.87 km^{2} (12.31 sq mi)
- Elevation: 500 m (1,600 ft)

Population (2025-01-01)
  - Total: 352
  - Density: 11.0/km^{2} (28.6/sq mi)
- Time zone: UTC+1 (CET)
  - Summer (DST): UTC+2 (CEST)
- Website: www.genalguacil.es

Genalguacil is a town and municipality in the province of Málaga, part of the autonomous community of Andalusia in southern Spain. The municipality is situated approximately 45 kilometers from Ronda and 34 km from the city of Estepona. It is located west of the province in the Genal valley. It is one of the populations that make up the region of the Serrania de Ronda. Genalguacil is in the judicial district of Ronda.

It has a population of approximately 499 residents. The natives are called Genalguacileños. Its Arabic name Genna - Ahuacir meant Gardens of the Vizier.

== Places of interest ==
The town is prominent for its museums. Every two years, artists gather there, for a week, doing different pieces of art to be left permanently on the street. Genalguacil is an open-air museum, with cobbled streets and paintings, sculptures, carved trunks, and other works of art integrated into the normal environment (such as a sculpture of a little old lady under a hill, called "Hasta el moño de tanta cuesta" (sick and tired of such slopes). Every detail (house numbers, street names, benches, fireplaces) are finished in artistic ways.

Other attraction of Genalguacil are some surroundings of high ecological value, where the pinsapo is abundant. It has a large game reserve.

== See also ==
- List of municipalities in Málaga
