= El Burgo =

Coordinates: 36.783°N 4.933°W

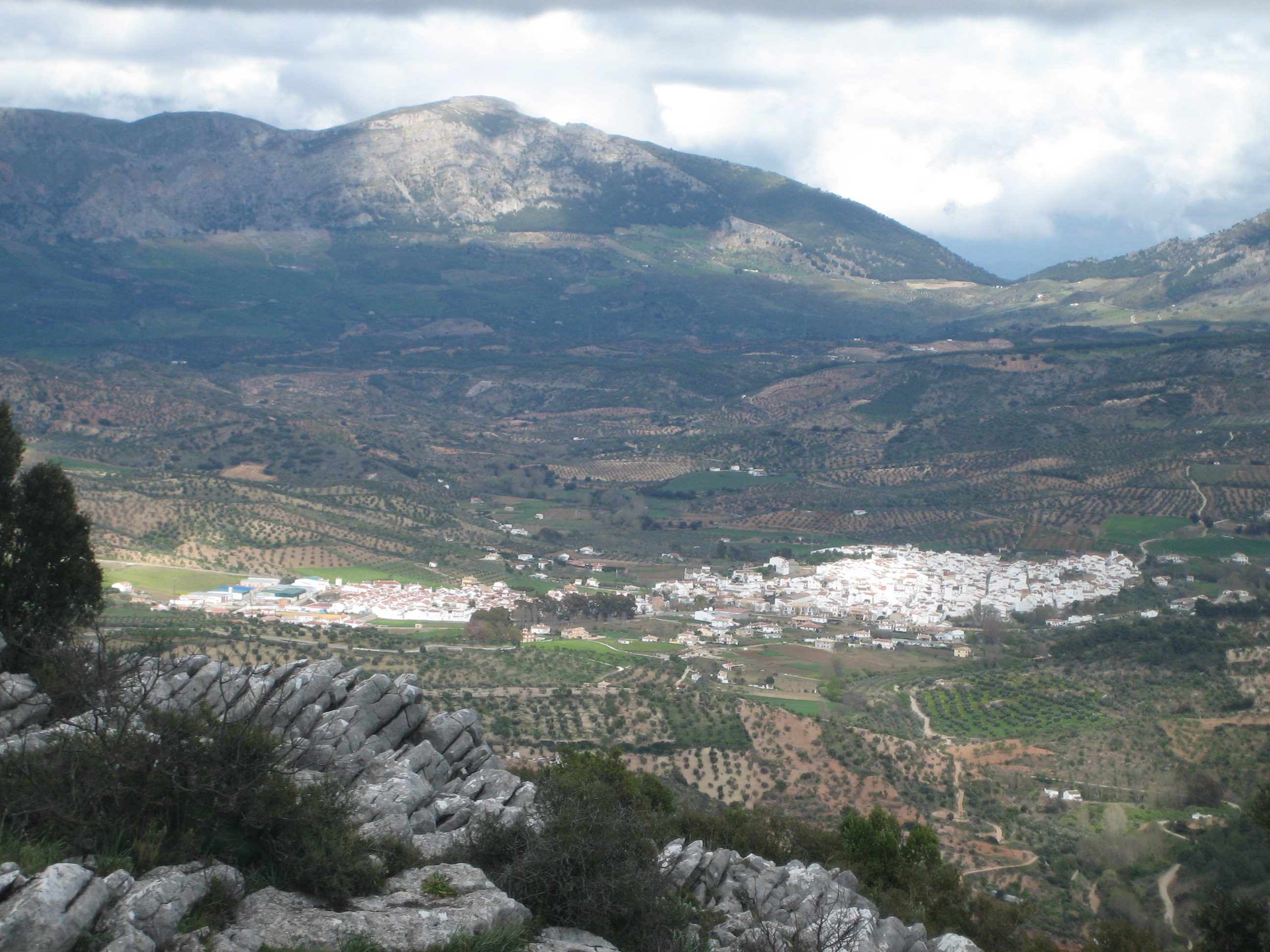
- El Burgo from a hilltop to the west

- Coat of arms

- Location in Spain.
- Sovereign state: Spain
- Autonomous community: Andalusia
- Province: Málaga

Area
  - Total: 118.35 km^{2} (45.70 sq mi)
- Elevation: 591 m (1,939 ft)

Population (2025-01-01)
  - Total: 1,761
  - Density: 14.88/km^{2} (38.54/sq mi)
- Time zone: UTC+1 (CET)
  - Summer (DST): UTC+2 (CEST)
- Website: www.elburgo.es

El Burgo is a town and municipality in the province of Málaga, located in the autonomous community of Andalusia in southern Spain. It is located in the Sierra de las Nieves National Park, which was declared a Biosphere Reserve by UNESCO.

In February they have a carnaval. Saint Augustine is celebrated at the end of August with traditional costumes, music, food and religious singing.

== See also ==
- List of municipalities in Málaga
