= Nororma =

- Comarca
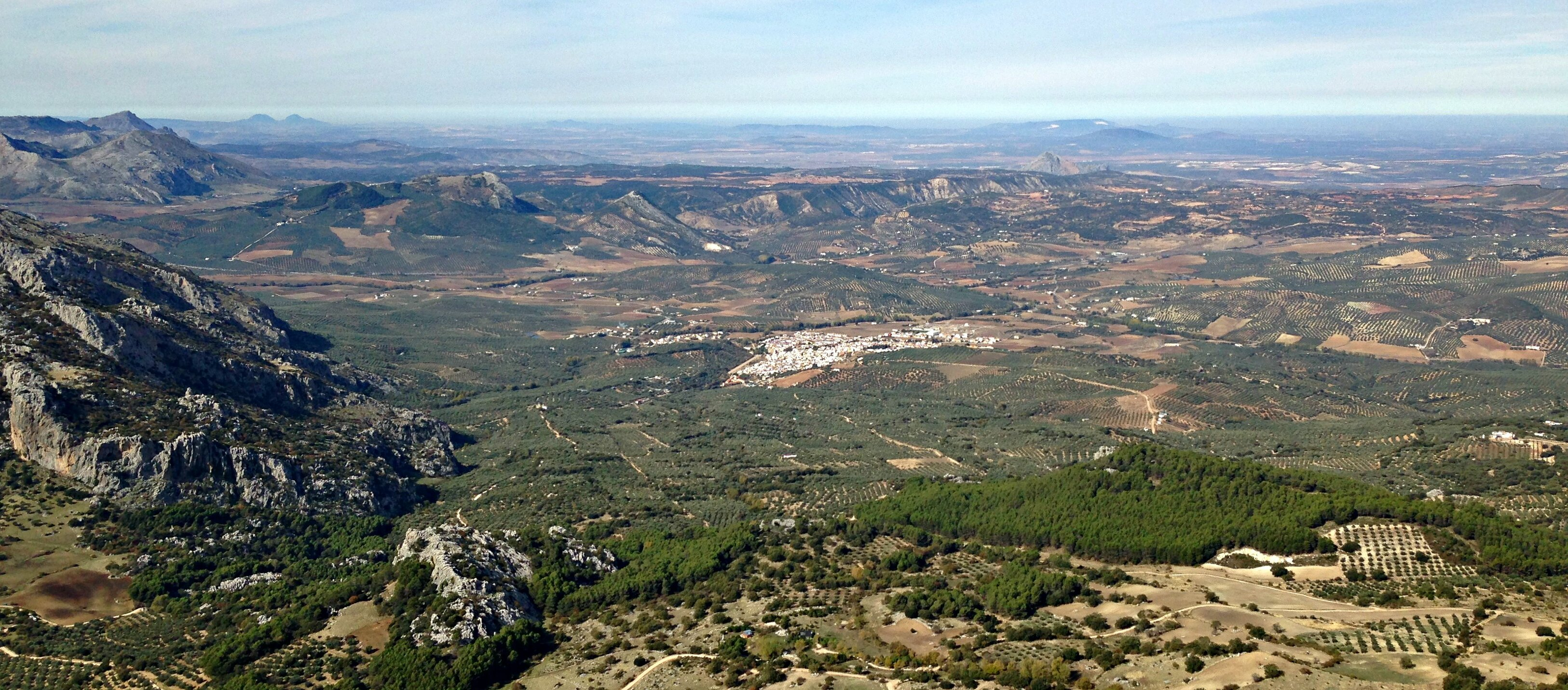
- Villanueva del Rosario

- Location of Nororma in Andalusia, Spain

- Location of Nororma in the province of Málaga
- Country: Spain
- Autonomous community: Andalusia
- Province: Málaga
- Capital: Archidona, Málaga

Area
  - Total: 435.24 km^{2} (168.05 sq mi)

Population (2024) (Note: Estimate at 1 January 2024: National Statistics Institute (Spain))
  - Total: 27,285
  - Density: 62.690/km^{2} (162.37/sq mi)
- Time zone: UTC+1 (CET)
  - Summer (DST): UTC+2 (CEST)

The Comarca Nororiental de Málaga (Nororma) is one of the nine comarcas in the province of Málaga. It contains the following municipalities: Archidona, Cuevas Bajas, Cuevas de San Marcos, Villanueva de Algaidas, Villanueva de Tapia, Villanueva del Rosario y Villanueva del Trabuco. This comarca was established in 2003 by the Government of Andalusia. It shares borders with the provinces of Granada to the east and Córdoba to the north, as well as the comarcas of La Axarquía to the south and Antequera to the west.

== Municipalities ==
Arms	Municipality	Area (km^{2})	Population (2024) (Note: Estimate at 1 January 2024: National Statistics Institute (Spain))	Density (/km^{2})
	Archidona	186.17	8,042	43.20
	Cuevas Bajas	16.51	1,341	81.22
	Cuevas de San Marcos	36.87	3,620	98.18
	Villanueva de Algaidas	70.5	4,075	57.80
	Villanueva del Rosario	43,94	3,401	77.40
	Villanueva de Tapia	22.11	1,396	63.14
	Villanueva del Trabuco	59.14	5,410	91.48
	Total	435.24	27,285	62.69

== See also ==
- Comarcas of Andalucía
