= Estefanía (given name) =

Estefanía is a female given name, equivalent to English Stephanie. Notable people referred to by this name include the following:

- Estefanía Ramírez (–1183), the wife of Count Ponce de Minerva
- Estefania Carròs i de Mur (1455–1511), Spanish educator
- Estefania Aldaba-Lim (1917–2006), the first female secretary of any Cabinet of the Philippines
- Estefanía Beltrán de Heredia (born 1960), Spanish agricultural engineer and politician of Basque nationalist ideology
- Estefanía Durán Ortiz (born 1969), Mexican politician
- Estefania Souza (born 1972), Brazilian female retired volleyball player
- Estefania Knuth (born 1973), Spanish professional golfer
- Estefanía Bottini (born 1974), Spanish former professional tennis player
- Estefanía Muñiz (born 1974), Spanish film director, scriptwriter, critic, and author of two poetry books
- Estefanía Gómez (born 1976), Colombian actress
- Estefanía de los Santos (born 1976), Spanish actress
- Estefania Sebastian (born 1982), Andorran sprinter
- Estefanía Torres Martínez (born 1982), Spanish politician
- Estefanía Domínguez Calvo (born 1984), Spanish professional triathlete
- Estefania Balda Álvarez (born 1987), Ecuadorian former professional tennis player
- Estefanía Villarreal (born 1987), Mexican actress
- Estefanía Craciún (born 1987), Uruguayan former tennis player
- Estefanía Bacca (born 1988), Argentine vedette, acrobat-dancer, actress, model and choreographer
- Estefania Fontanini (born 1988), Argentine sprint canoer
- Estefania García (born 1988), Ecuadorian judoka
- Estefanía Tapias (born 1988), Colombian city climate researcher and entrepreneur active in Switzerland
- Estefanía Realpe (born 1989), Ecuadorian model and beauty pageant
- Estefanía Lima (born 1989), Spanish footballer
- Estefanía Banini (born 1990), Argentine professional footballer
- Estefanía Ramírez (born 1991), Colombian rugby union player
- Estefanía Álvarez (born 1994), Colombian synchronized swimmer
- Estefanía Fernández (born 1996), Spanish canoeist
- Estefanía Soriano (born 1996), Dominican judoka
- Estefanía Nebot, Miss Venezuela
- Estefanía Soto, Miss Universe Puerto Rico in 2020

== See also ==
- Estefanía (surname)
- Stefania (name)
- Stephanie
