= Tapias =

Tapias or Tàpias is a Spanish surname. Notable people with the surname include:

- Celia Tapias (1885–1964), the first female lawyer to practice law in the City of Buenos Aires and the second in Argentina
- Estefanía Tapias (born 1988), Colombian city climate researcher and entrepreneur
- Fernando Tapias Stahelin (1943–2015), General of Colombian Armed Forces
- José Antonio Pérez Tapias (born 1955), Spanish politician, author, and university professor
- Luis Castellanos Tapias (died in 1968), Colombian attorney, historian, politician, publisher, and writer
- Miguel Tapias (born 1997), Mexican professional footballer
- Pere Tàpias (1946–2017), singer and food writer in Catalonia

== See also ==
- Tapia (surname)
