= Tapia (surname) =

Tapia is a Spanish surname. Notable people with the surname include:

- Abel Tapia (born 1949), American politician
- Alejandro Tapia y Rivera (1826–1882), Puerto Rican writer
- Anthony Tapia (born 1987), Colombian footballer
- Antonio Tapia (born 1949), Spanish footballer and football coach
- Bill Tapia (1908–2011), American musician
- Carlos Tapia, multiple people
- Domingo Tapia (born 1991), Dominican baseball player
- Gene Tapia (1925–2005), American race car driver
- Gloria Tapia (born 1972), Swedish actress
- Héctor Tapia (born 1977), Chilean-Italian footballer
- Humberto Tapia (1986–2011), Mexican boxer
- Johnny Tapia (1967–2012), American boxer
- José Tapia, multiple people
- Josefina Tapia (born 2002), Chilean skateboarder
- Keith Tapia (born 1990), Puerto Rican boxer
- Leonidas Tapia (?-1977), a Puebloan potter
- Luis Tapia, multiple people
- Lydia Tapia, American computer scientist
- Manny Tapia (born 1981), American mixed martial arts fighter
- Margarita Tapia (born 1976), Mexican runner
- Miguel Tapia (born 1964), Chilean musician
- Nabila Tapia (born 1992), Dominican beauty pageant winner
- Nelson Tapia (born 1966), Chilean footballer
- Pedro Tapia (1582–1657), Spanish Archbishop
- Raimel Tapia (born 1994), Dominican baseball player
- Ramón Tapia, multiple people
- Renato Tapia (born 1995), Peruvian footballer
- Richard A. Tapia (1939–2026), American mathematician and academic
- Tiburcio Tapia Mexican soldier, merchant, winery and ranch owner
- Yoel Tapia (born 1984), Dominican sprinter

== See also ==
- Tapia (disambiguation)
- Tapias, Spanish surname
