= Tapia =

Tapia may refer to:

== Places ==
- Tapia de Casariego, a town in Asturias, Spain
- Villanueva de Tapia, a town and municipality in Málaga, Spain
- Tapia, part of Lugoj in Timiş, Romania
- Tapia, a city in Tucumán, Argentina

== Other uses ==
- Tapia (surname), Spanish surname
- Tapia (tree) (Uapaca bojeri), a plant species endemic to Madagascar
- A Spanish term for tabby concrete
- Tapia House Movement, a political party in Trinidad and Tobago
