= Battle of Archidona =

Battle of Archidona (1434)
- Part of the Spanish Reconquista
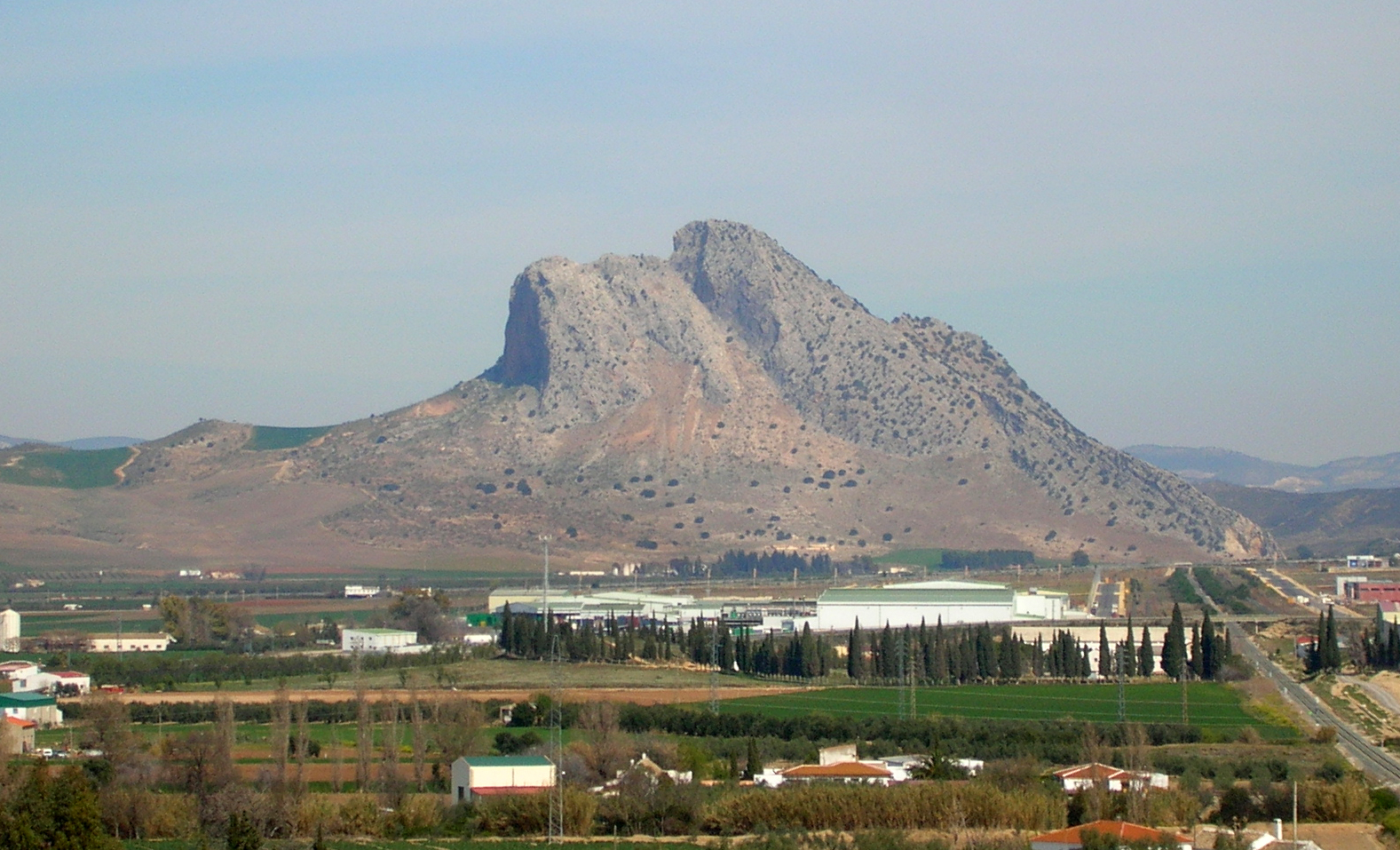
- Peña de los Enamorados, where the Christians got ambushed
Date	1434
Location	Peña de los Enamorados, Archidona 37°4′4″N 4°29′24″W
Result	Granadan victory

Belligerents
Crown of Castile: Order of Alcántara	Emirate of Granada

Commanders and leaders
Gutierre de Sotomayor	Unknown

Strength
800 knights 400–1,000 infantry	500 men

Casualties and losses
All but 100 killed or captured	Unknown

The Battle of Archidona was a military engagement between the Order of Alcántara and the Granadans in 1434 near Archidona. The Granadans successfully ambushed the Crusader force, with only 100 surviving.

== Background ==
In 1434, the Castilian king, John II, entrusted the Grandmaster of the Order of Alcántara, Gutierre de Sotomayor, with the defense border of Écija against any Granadan raids from Archidona, taking any offensive if necessary. Impatient for the friars to distinguish themselves in some risky undertaking, they dispatched scouts to Archidona and falsely informed Gutierre that Archidona would be easy to capture. Listening to their word, Gutierre, with a force of 800 knights and 400 or 1,000 infantry, went to surprise the Granadan town.

== Battle ==
The Crusader force arrived at Peña de los Enamorados and decided to venture into the deep ravines that form the banks of the Guadalhorce River, which are now called the slopes of Archidona. The guides told Gutierre that it is an uninhabited place, always silent, where we will not find any traces, except those of wild beasts and vermin. The knights had to dismount and lead their horses by the bridle to avoid being thrown over the edge. The Christians passed the ravine confidently, not knowing they'd fall in the trap.

The Christians saw figures appearing and swirling on the summits, seemingly fantastic, howling and brandishing torches. The Christians believed that the evil spirits, worthy inhabitants of the moors, were retreating. This illusion did not last long: they were the Granadans of Archidona and its region, who had spied on the Christians and followed them quietly until they fell into the trap. The Granadans attacked with impunity; large boulders, rolled down from the summits, descended with a buzz, dragging along a hail of smaller stones and causing havoc.

The Granadans attacked the flank and front and, after a courageous resistance from the Castilians, struck down at the center, killing and capturing many. Only 100 men, including the Grand Master, escaped from the massacre.

== Aftermath ==
Much discouragement seized the Christians with the news of this defeat. The Castilians, who were besieging Huelma, raised their camps and withdrew to the capital. King John, although very sad, wrote a benevolent letter to the master, granting him the authority to fill the vacant positions due to the deaths of the commanders and knights.

== Sources ==
- Miguel Lafuente y Alcántara (1845), Historia de Granada, comprendiendo la de sus cuatro provincias Almería, Jaén, Granada y Málaga, desde remotos tiempos hasta nuestros días, Vol III.
- Johann Samuel Ersch (1841), Allgemeine encyclopädie der wissenschaften und künste in alphabetischer folge von genannten schrifts bearbeitet und herausgegeben von J.S. Ersch und J.G. Gruber ...: 0-Z.
- Juan de Mata Carriazo (2002), En la frontera de Granada.
