= José Tapia (disambiguation) =

José Tapia (1905-?) was a Cuban football coach who managed Cuba in the 1938 FIFA World Cup

José Tapia may also refer to:

- José Tapia Brea (1908–1984), Dominican writer, historian, lawyer, jurist, ambassador, and anti-Trujillo fighter
- José Félix Tapia (1910–1969), Spanish writer

== See also ==
- Josefina Tapia (born 2002), Chilean skateboarder
