= Cuevas Bajas =

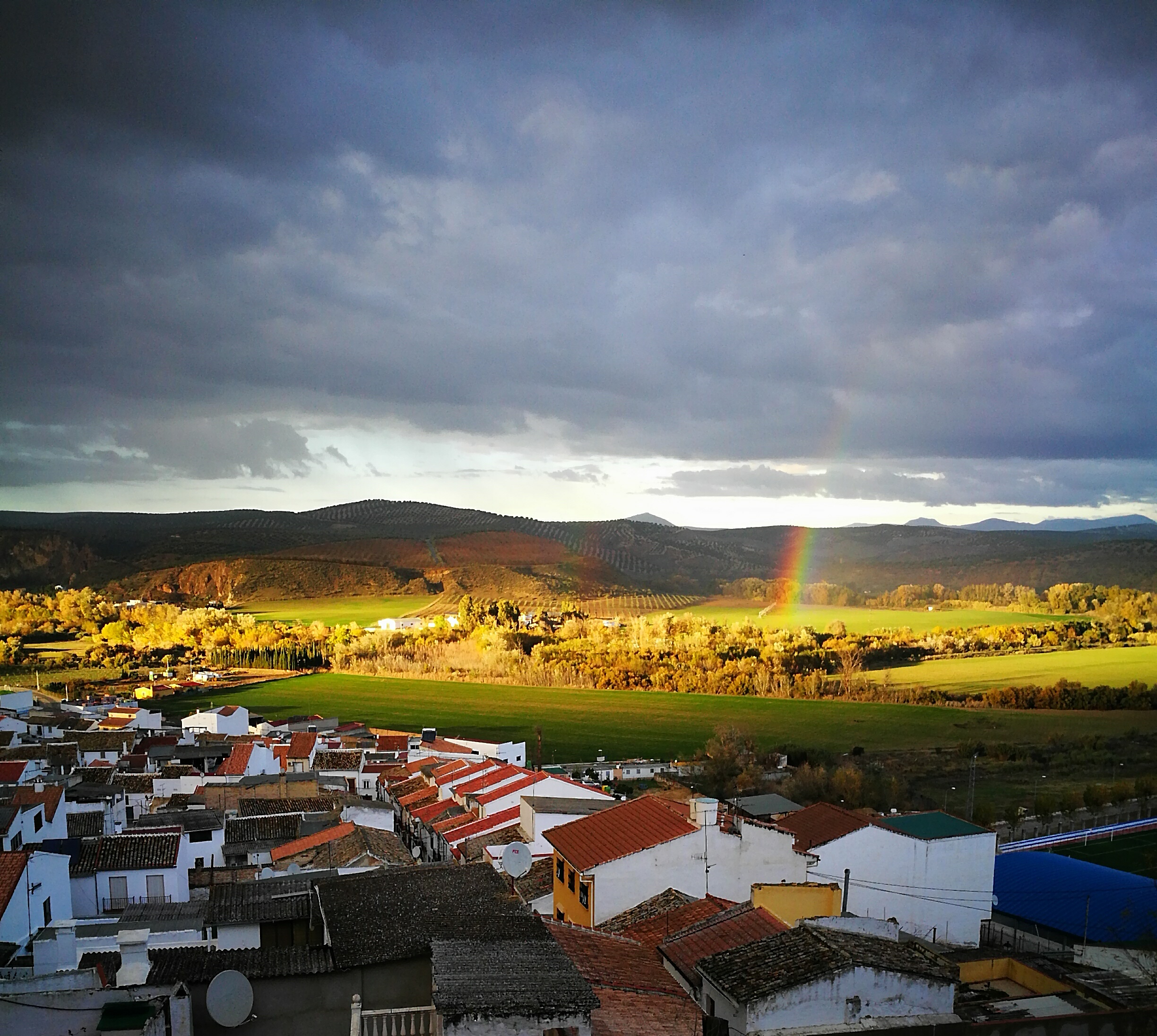

- Coat of arms

- Location in Andalusia Cuevas Bajas (Andalusia) Cuevas Bajas (Spain)
- Coordinates: 37°14′01″N 4°29′07″W
- Sovereign state: Spain
- Autonomous community: Andalusia
- Province: Málaga
- Comarca: Antequera

Government

Area
  - Total: 17 km^{2} (6.6 sq mi)
- Elevation: 312 m (1,024 ft)

Population (2025-01-01)
  - Total: 1,341
  - Density: 79/km^{2} (200/sq mi)
- Demonym: Cueveños
- Time zone: UTC+1 (CET)
  - Summer (DST): UTC+2 (CEST)
- Postal code: 29220
- Website: http://www.cuevasbajas.es

Cuevas Bajas is a town and municipality in the province of Málaga, part of the autonomous community of Andalusia in southern Spain. It belongs to the comarca of Nororma. It is part of the judicial district of Archidona. The municipality is situated 75 kilometers from Málaga and 495 km from Madrid In 2011 it had a population of 1,482 inhabitants. Its surface area is 16.53 km^{2}. Cuevas Bajas has a density of 89.66 inhabitants/km^{2}. The natives are called Cueveños.

== Geography ==
Cuevas Bajas is located in a valley where Málaga overlooks the Genil river. It is located on the northern edge of the Antequera region along the river Genii. Cuevas Bajas retains the appearance of an Andalusian village, with short, narrow streets and its houses with barred windows and balconies. It has an altitude of 323 meters above sea level.

== History ==
The region where Cuevas Bajas is located has historical antecedents from the Paleolithic. This has been evidenced by the instruments that appeared around the town and river terraces of the Genii. During the Roman period, around the second century BC, near Cuevas Bajas passed one of the Roman roads that was registered in the Itinerary of Antonio and numerous villas whose remains have been found during his term. After the Arab domination, the square being conquered by the Alcaide of Antequera D. Fernando de Narváez in the year 1426, thanks to the distribution of land, the town began to repopulate slowly growing to Cuevas Bajas.

== Monuments ==
Its most interesting monuments are the church of San Juan Bautista, built in the eighteenth century. The main street with facades and the village of Kidron maintains the typical architecture of the area.

== See also ==
- List of municipalities in Málaga
