= Málaga-Costa del Sol =

- Comarca
- Location of Málaga-Costa del Sol in Andalusia, Spain

- Location of Málaga-Costa del Sol in the province of Málaga
- Country: Spain
- Autonomous community: Andalusia
- Province: Málaga
- Capital: Málaga
- Municipalities: List: Málaga

Area
  - Total: 395 km^{2} (153 sq mi)

Population (2024)
  - Total: 591,637
  - Density: 1,500/km^{2} (3,880/sq mi)
- Time zone: UTC+1 (CET)
  - Summer (DST): UTC+2 (CEST)

Málaga-Costa del Sol is one of the nine comarcas into which the province of Málaga is divided and is the second most populated comarca in the autonomous community of Andalusia.

== Geography ==
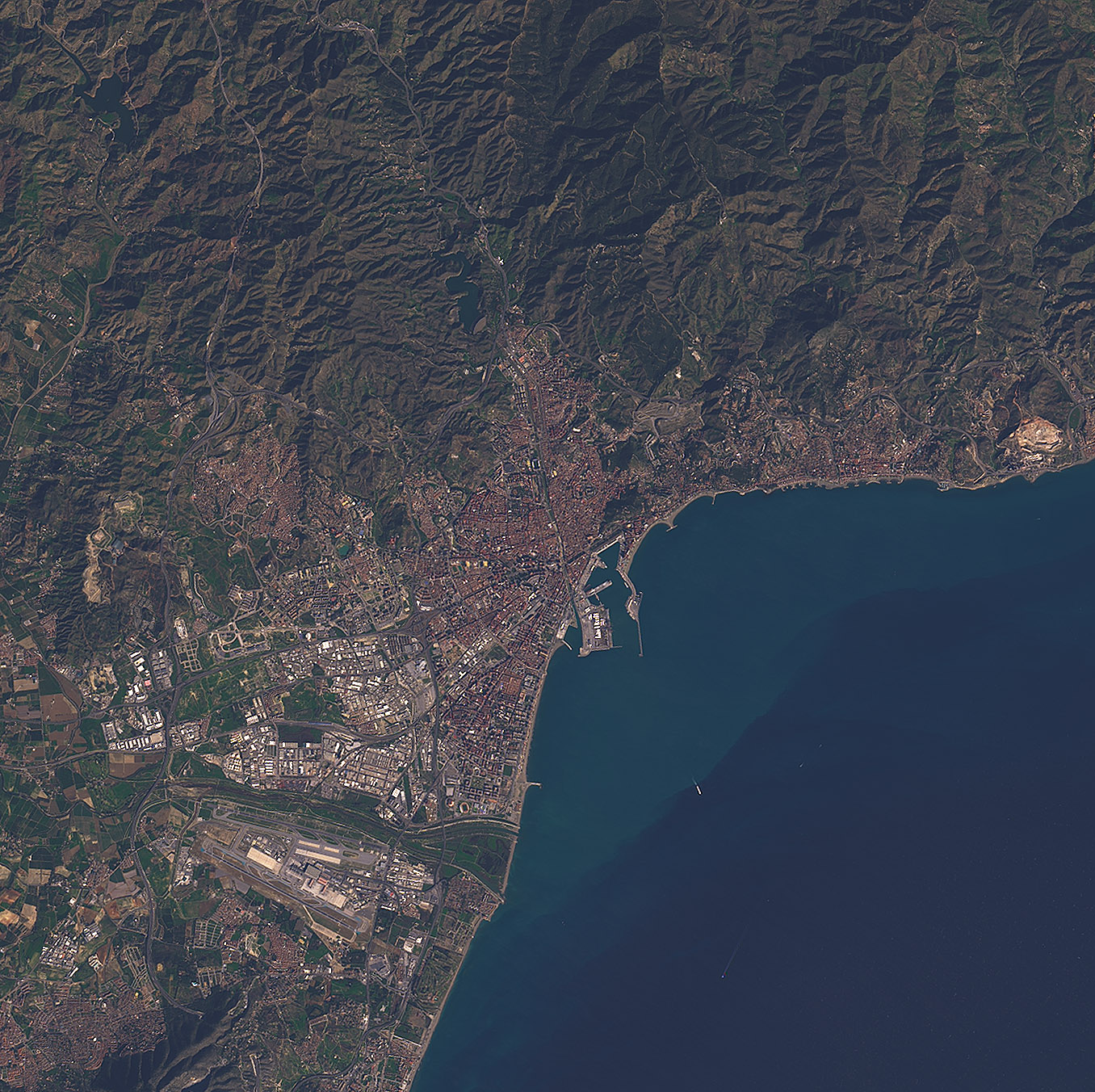
Satelltie view centered on Málaga city. Montes de Málaga Natural Park spreads over the upper-right corner.

The region occupies part of the lower valley of the Guadalhorce River, the Hoya de Málaga and a large part of the Montes de Málaga, including a Natural Park. The landscape is covered by fields of orange, lemon and cane trees dotted with farmhouses, which gradually give way to industrial buildings on the outskirts of the city.

The mountains are covered with almond, olive and holm oak trees and are cut by narrow valleys excavated by torrential rivers such as the Guadalmedina that end at the bay of Málaga.

== Municipalities ==
The comarca only contains the municipality of Málaga city.

Arms	Municipality	Area	Population	Density
	Málaga	395.0	591,637	1,497.8

== See also ==
- Comarcas of Andalusia
