= Villaharta =

- city
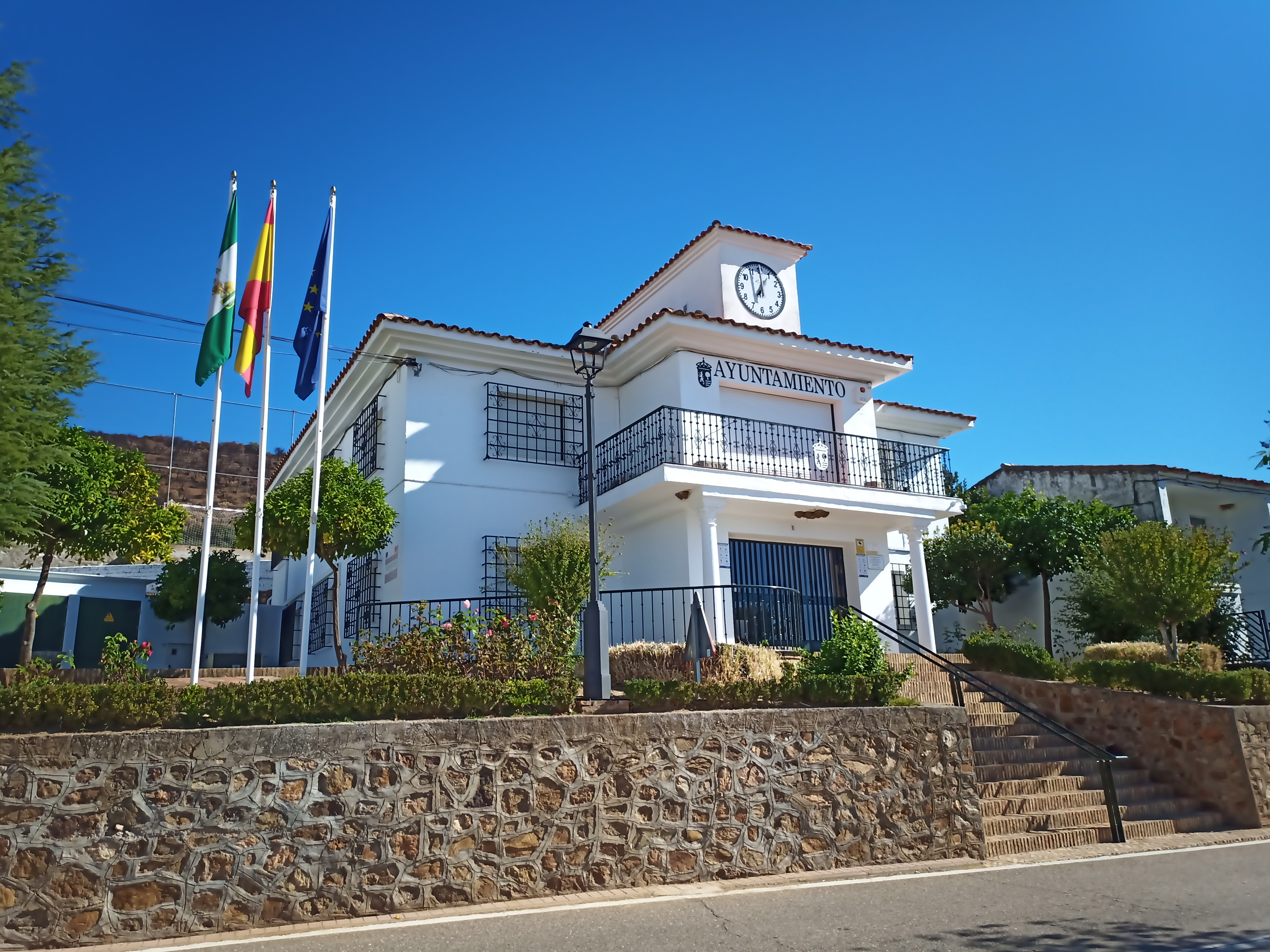
- Town hall

- Seal

- Location in Spain.
- Coordinates: 38°08′N 4°54′W
- Country: Spain
- Autonomous community: Andalusia
- Province: Córdoba
- Comarca: Valle del Guadiato

Government
  - Mayor: Alfonso Expósito Galán

Area
  - Total: 12 km^{2} (4.6 sq mi)
- Elevation: 580 m (1,900 ft)

Population (2025-01-01)
  - Total: 630
  - Density: 52/km^{2} (140/sq mi)
- Demonym: Villaharteños
- Time zone: UTC+1 (CET)
  - Summer (DST): UTC+2 (CEST)

Villaharta is a city located in the province of Córdoba, Spain.

== See also ==
- List of municipalities in Córdoba
