= Estefanía (surname) =

Estefanía is a Spanish surname. Notable people with the surname include:

- Juan Estefanía (1884–1943), Spanish businessman and sports leader
- Marcial Lafuente Estefanía (1903–1984), Spanish writer of romance and western fiction
- Oskitz Estefanía (born 1986), Spanish former footballer

== See also ==
- Estefanía (given name)
