= Luis Tapia =

Luis Tapia may refer to:

- Luis Ernesto Tapia (1944–2024), retired Panamanian soccer player
  - Cancha de Entrenamiento Luis Tapia, a soccer stadium in Panama
- Luis Castellanos Tapias, Colombian historian
- Luis Tapia (artist), an American sculptor
