= Villanueva de Algaidas =

- Municipality
- Coat of arms

- Location within Province of Málaga Location within Andalusia Location within Spain
- Coordinates: 37°10′59″N 4°27′00″W
- Sovereign state: Spain
- Autonomous community: Andalusia
- Province: Málaga
- Comarca: Comarca Nororiental de Málaga (Nororma)

Government
  - Mayor: Juan Cívico (PSOE)

Area
  - Total: 75 km^{2} (29 sq mi)
- Elevation: 536 m (1,759 ft)

Population (2025-01-01)
  - Total: 4,084
  - Density: 54/km^{2} (140/sq mi)
- Demonym(s): algaideño, -ña
- Website: villanuevadealgaidas.es

Villanueva de Algaidas is a town and municipality in the North-Eastern Malaga comarca (Nororma), province of Málaga, part of the autonomous community of Andalusia in southern Spain. The municipality is situated approximately 11 kilometres from Archidona, 30 from Antequera and 70 from the provincial capital of Málaga. It has a population of approximately 4,200 residents. The natives are called Algaideños.

== People ==
- Miguel Berrocal (1933-2006), sculptor

== See also ==
- List of municipalities in Málaga
