= Villanueva del Rosario, Andalusia =

Villanueva del Rosario
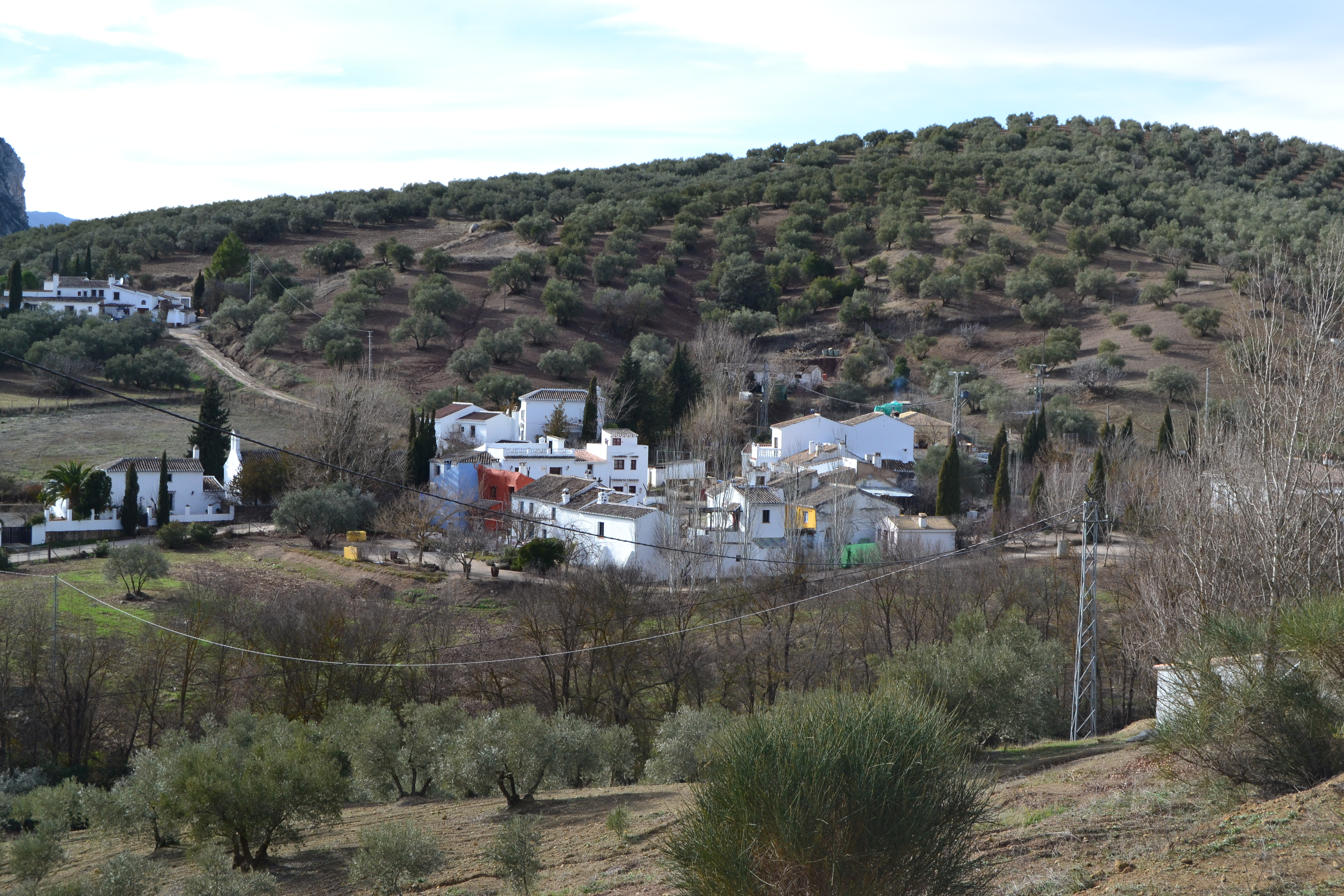

- Coat of arms

- Location in Spain.
- Coordinates: 37°00′N 4°21′W
- Sovereign state: Spain
- Autonomous community: Andalusia
- Province: Málaga

Area
  - Total: 44.6 km^{2} (17.2 sq mi)
- Elevation: 697 m (2,287 ft)

Population (2025-01-01)
  - Total: 3,470
  - Density: 77.8/km^{2} (202/sq mi)
- Time zone: UTC+1 (CET)
  - Summer (DST): UTC+2 (CEST)
- Website: www.villanuevadelrosario.com

Villanueva del Rosario is a town and municipality in the province of Málaga in the autonomous community of Andalusia in southern Spain. It is located off the motorway from Málaga to Granada and Seville. It is situated in the northeast of the province. It belongs to the comarca of Nororma.

The white washed pueblo sits at the base of the Cerro de la Cruz, with rolling countryside on the other three sides. Famous for the quality of its olive oil, the countryside is naturally populated with olive trees and wheat fields in between.

The population is approximately 3,500. The feria is celebrated during the first week in August, and is known as "La Veladilla del Carmen". There is another feria in October to celebrate the patron called the "La Virgen del Rosario". Festivities however start earlier in the year on April 25 when the population, in common with other agricultural communities celebrate "La Romeria de San Marcos" who is the patron saint of the countryside. The pueblo acts as a base for potholers who can explore the caverns in the Sierra, or for cycling, horse riding or walking holidays. Several properties are available for 'rural tourism'.

== History ==
The original village dates back to 1812 when it obtained its independence from Archidona, protected by Royal Decree from the Courts of Cádiz, and was called Puebla del Saucedo. The inhabitants of Archidona opposed this both bitterly and violently so that eventually the new village had to turn to the Council of the King's Chambers where the dispute was finally settled in 1827. Three years later the village changed its name to Villanueva del Rosario.

The area was originally inhabited by Romans, who were followed by Arabic and Visigoth settlements by the river bank. It is said that the important Roman city of Ulisis was situated here on the area known as Peñon de Solis. It is rumoured that treasure lies below the peak but no one has ever found it. Many Roman roads are still in existence, and a number of object including coins, bracelets, glass and ceramic fragments, have been found in the area. The town centre was founded in the eighteenth century, it is said due to the abundance of willow trees (which still exist), and encouraged the settlement of Saucedo. Today the residents are still known as Saucedaños. The two Copper Age archaeological sites in the municipality can be found at the Finca Tardón and the other is in the Peñon del Oso mountain area.

== Places to visit ==
The Copper Era sites and the Visigoth necropolis (burial grounds) are found in the hills, but most of them have been robbed or partially destroyed. The shrine built in honour of the villages patron saint "La Virgen del Rosario" is situated above the village on the way to "El Nacimiento", a spring at the base of the mountain which supplies the village with drinking water. Continuing upwards the Hondoneros is reached high on the Sierra los Camarolos and Sierra Gorda, where many different species of flora and fauna can be found.

== See also ==
- List of municipalities in Málaga
