= Miguel Ortiz Berrocal =

Spanish sculptor

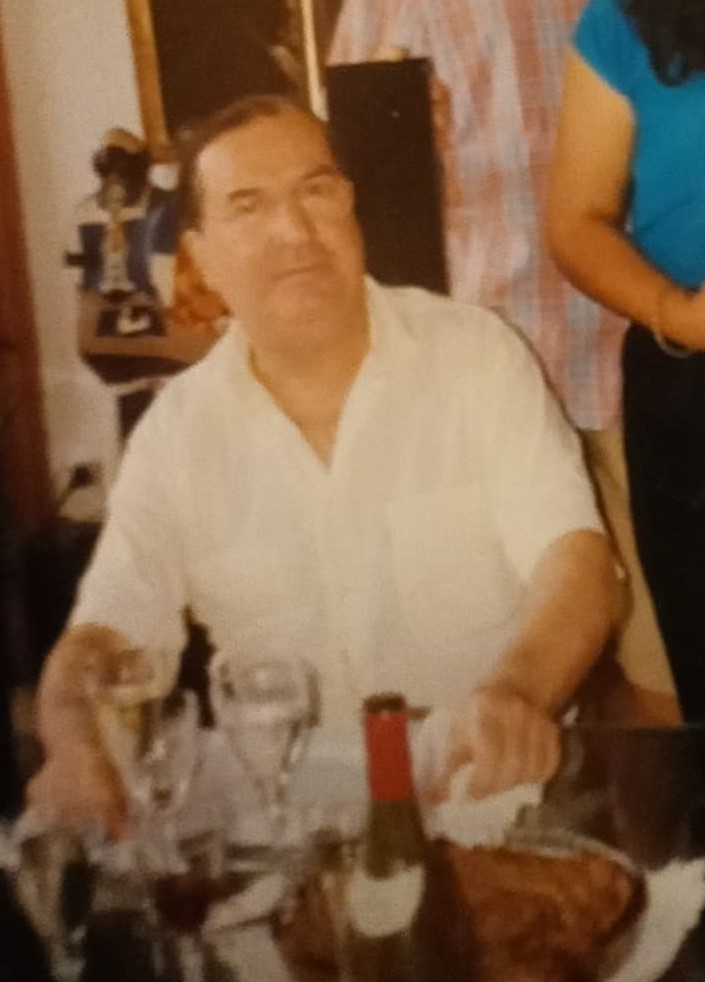
- Miguel Berrocal in 1996
- Born: September 28, 1933; Villanueva de Algaidas, Málaga
- Died: May 31, 2006 (aged 72); Antequera, Málaga
- Known for: Puzzle sculptures
- Style: Figurative, abstract

Miguel Ortiz Berrocal (Villanueva de Algaidas, Málaga, 28 September 1933 – Antequera, Málaga, 31 May 2006) was a Spanish figurative and abstract sculptor. He is best known for his puzzle sculptures, which can be disassembled into many abstract pieces. These works are also known for the miniature artworks and jewelry incorporated into or concealed within them, and the fact that some of the sculptures can be reassembled or reconfigured into different arrangements. Berrocal's sculptures span a wide range of physical sizes from monumental outdoor public works, to intricate puzzle sculptures small enough to be worn as pendants, bracelets, or other body ornamentation.

From 1967 to 2004, Berrocal worked in Verona, Italy, and in nearby Negrar, where he worked closely with sculptural foundries to produce his art. His work was exhibited widely throughout Europe and also in North and South America and Japan. In 2004 he returned to his birthplace in Spain, remaining artistically active until his sudden death in 2006. The Fundación Escultor Berrocal (Berrocal Sculpture Foundation) continues to preserve and promote his artwork and legacy, from its headquarters in his hometown of Villanueva de Algaigas in Spain.

== Biography ==
=== Education ===
From a very early age, Berrocal demonstrated a talent for art and research. He produced his own toys with recycled material, drawing and painting with colors of his own design. He completed his education in Madrid. An important experience was his first visit to the Prado art museum, which he revisited often. He attended the Academia de Bellas Artes de San Fernando, the Escuela de Artes Graficas, and evening classes at the Escuela de Artes y Oficios, where he befriended his tutor the sculptor Ángel Ferrant. He enrolled at the Faculty of Exact Sciences to prepare for the entrance examination for Architecture studies. He was fascinated by analytic geometry, and this later manifested itself in the style of his works.

=== Artistic beginnings ===
In 1952, Berrocal's first exhibition took place in Madrid at the Galería Xagra. He showed drawings of people and landscapes of Algaidas and Madrid. These were signed with his paternal surname, "Ortiz". He was awarded a grant to study in Italy. Berrocal was only familiar with Rome through his classical studies. After visiting the sites of Roman civilization, he lived in Rome for several months. There, for the first time, he came upon an exhibit of the work of Picasso in a major exhibition at the Galleria Nazionale d'Arte Moderna. Exhibits of Picasso's work were prohibited in Spain at the time.

In 1954 he returned to Spain to undergo military service. He returned to the Faculty of Exact Sciences and to his drawing and sculpture classes. He found his friend Ferrant, who encouraged him in his work. He was invited to take part in the XXVII Biennale di Venezia, where he exhibited his drawings in the Spanish Pavilion, still signed "Ortiz".

The award of a grant, by the Institut Français in Madrid, enabled Berrocal to travel to Paris in 1955. Plunging into the stimulating atmosphere that the city offered him, he continued his work as a painter. He frequently saw the sculptors Cárdenas and Giacometti and many others. He returned to Rome, where he met Afro, Burri, Guerrini and other artists. He worked for various established architects, and with a group of young companions, he prepared an entry for a project for the construction of the Chamber of Commerce in Carrara. For the ornamentation of the facade, the 22-year-old Berrocal invented a solution for the balustrades. His work was based on eight modules with which he obtained a number of permutations and combinations that far exceeded the requirement to make each of the building's balustrades different from the others.

In 1957, he exhibited his first sculptures, in wrought iron, at the Galleria La Medusa, in Rome. The works that he produced during the summer, in the studio he rented in Mougins on the Côte d’Azur, concluded his cycle of activity as a painter. At this time he succeeded in being received by Picasso at La Californie. He returned to Rome and from then on concentrated on sculpture. Works made in this period included La Boîte découpée, Sarcophage and Grand Torse. These works mark the transition from the analysis of the problem of filled and empty space, and the multiplicity of positions of a single sculpture, to the problem of the combinatorial possibility of different volumes.

After making the decision to devote himself exclusively to sculpture, Berrocal had a house/studio, designed by Le Corbusier built in Crespières, near Paris. He had an important first sculptural exhibition at the Galleria Apollinaire in Milan, for which he signed his work definitively as "Berrocal". Bruno Lorenzelli, a well-known director of an art gallery in Bergamo, became his first dealer. Works produced in this period included Torso Benamejí and Torso Her, first made in plaster and wood, and then cast in bronze and aluminum respectively.

1962 was a year full of events and important decisions. His exhibitions included shows with Ipoustéguy and Müller in New York at the Albert Loeb Gallery. Loeb henceforth acted as his dealer in the United States. His important first solo exhibition in Paris was at the Galerie Kriegel. Kriegel became a very close friend and acted as his dealer in France for many years. Throughout his life, Berrocal was known for his deliberate attempts to portray variety in his sculptures, often submitting individual pieces to different exhibitions.

=== Search for a foundry ===
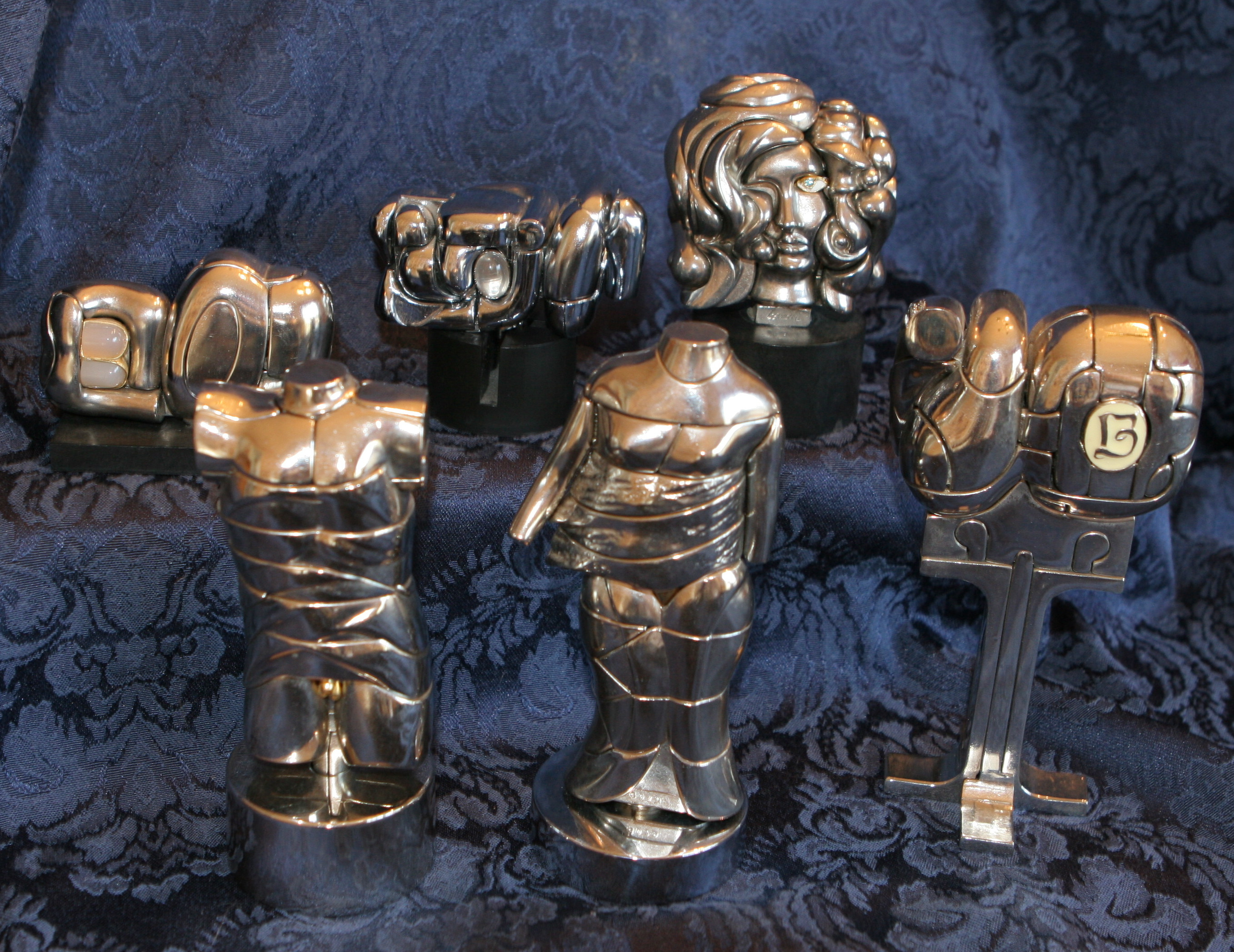
Set of Berrocal mini puzzle sculptures marketed in the 1970s, each of which incorporates a wearable finger ring

On his way to the Biennale di Venezia, he stopped at Verona because of his search for foundries. Here he found a small foundry willing to cast his sculptures. Together, they made Verona and its foundries one of the most important centres for contemporary art in Europe. In addition to his own work, Berrocal brought the best-known sculptors of the time to Verona, including: Miró, Dalí, Magritte, De Chirico, Lalanne, Lam, Matta, Duchamp-Villon, Ipoustéguy, César, Étienne Martin, Peñalba and many others.

His sculptural exploration led him to experiment with new techniques and materials. Thanks to his scientific training, he applied technologies used only in the most advanced sectors of industry to his art. He began experimenting in the early 60's, making 200 copies of the sculpture María de la O.

In 1964 Berrocal exhibited as a sculptor in the Spanish Pavilion at the XXXII Biennale di Venezia, where the Belgian collector Baron Lambert acquired Mercedes for his collection. Jules Engel made the film Torch and Torso, the first in an extensive range of films about Berrocal and his work, which was presented at the Museum of Modern Art in New York and received numerous prizes. Other films and videos have been produced in European, American and Japanese editions. During his stay in New York, in Lipchitz’s studio, he learned about the Shaw process, a lost wax system for casting in porcelain. Despite considerable difficulties, after some years, he succeeded in importing this technique to Italy and applying it. It revolutionized the world of artistic casting because it permitted lost wax casting in bronze, significantly reducing costs and casting times, and guaranteeing high quality and fidelity to the original. He taught Technique of Materials at the Hochschule für bildende Künste in Hamburg. He selected Thomas as his dealer in Germany and had his first exhibition in Munich.

The need to find better foundries obliged him to shuttle every week between Paris and Verona; he decided to settle definitively in the latter city in 1967. After remaining there for a while, he moved to Negrar, where he would live until 2004. His sculpture became increasingly complex. The search for a "fourth dimension" became evident in Adamo Secundus and David, small works with complex possibilities of disassembly. The sculptures of this period were so successful that in the United States they acquired the status of "conversation pieces".

In 1968 Berrocal was made a Chevalier de l’Ordre des Arts et des Lettres by the French Minister of Culture, André Malraux. German television made a documentary about Negrar. He exhibited at the Palais des Beaux-Arts in Brussels, where he met artist Henry Moore, and Baron Lambert, the first of the considerable number of his devoted Belgian collectors and friends. Colonel Marcel Stal became his dealer. He presented an exhibition at the Badischer Kunstverein in Karlsruhe.

The successful series of exhibitions in private galleries begun in 1968 continued in: Frankfurt, Geneva, Paris, New York, Milan and Hanover, among others. This year he finally produced Romeo e Giulietta, using the technique of injection casting, which for the first time enabled him to make 2000 copies of a sculpture. He used similar techniques to make Goliath which consisted of 80 pieces and Richelieu which had 61. He worked on the book/object Petite Rapsodie de la main, with text by Loys Masson. Important works produced during this period are Sainte Agathe II, Cleopatra and Alfa e Romeo, a work specifically studied as an illustration for Petite Rapsodie de la main. Mini David began the series of five mini-sculptures produced in quantities of 10,000 copies, using the automatic injection technique, a procedure hitherto used exclusively in industrial manufacturing. The Galería Iolas-Velasco in Madrid presented his sculptures in Spain for the first time. Various well-known dealers created Multicetera, a company for the distribution of his mini-sculptures. He received the Gold Medal from the Presidency of the Italian Republic for "Metal as a pure expression of art" at the V Biennale del Metallo in Gubbio.

=== 1970s ===
In 1971 Berrocal met Maria Cristina Blais de Saxe-Coburgo e Bragança, the daughter of a famous Portuguese throne pretender Maria Pia of Braganza. They married a few years later and had two sons, both born in Verona, Carlos Miguel Berrocal de Saxe-Coburgo e Bragança in 1976 and Beltrán José Berrocal de Saxe-Coburgo e Bragança in 1978.

In 1972, the city of Málaga gave him a commission for a large monument as a tribute to Picasso. In 1976 Monumento a Picasso was exhibited at the Rond-Point of the Champs Élysées in Paris before its final placement in Málaga.

In 1973, Berrocal represented Spain at the XXII Bienal de São Paulo, and was awarded the Grand Prize of Honour. He visited Brazil, Peru, and Venezuela and exhibited in Caracas. On the basis of the experience of the Monumento a Picasso, he undertook a new series of monumental works, including Richelieu Big, Almudena, Dalirium tremens and Torso C. Also produced in this period were the editions of Il Cofanetto, a tribute to Romeo and Juliet and the city of Verona, and Paloma Box, a tribute to Paloma Picasso. Paloma Picasso lived for a few months in the Villa Rizzardi, Berrocal's home, and she worked on her own jewelry in Berrocal's workshop.

He went back to painting and did a series of gouaches and numerous painting variations on recurrent themes in his sculptures: torsos, female figures, reclining nudes, heads, and still lifes. During a journey in the Belgian Ardennes he found a group of old anvils, which he bought which, in 1982, gave rise to the series Desperta Ferro, Almogávares, and the not completed Las Mujeres pasadas por la piedra. With the Spanish architect Ricardo Bofill, he studied a project for a sculptural work one kilometre long, on the border between France and Spain, and also a design for the trou des Halles (a nickname for Les Halles in Paris). Neither of these ambitious architectural projects were carried out. He gave a talk at the École d’Art de Luminy in Marseilles.

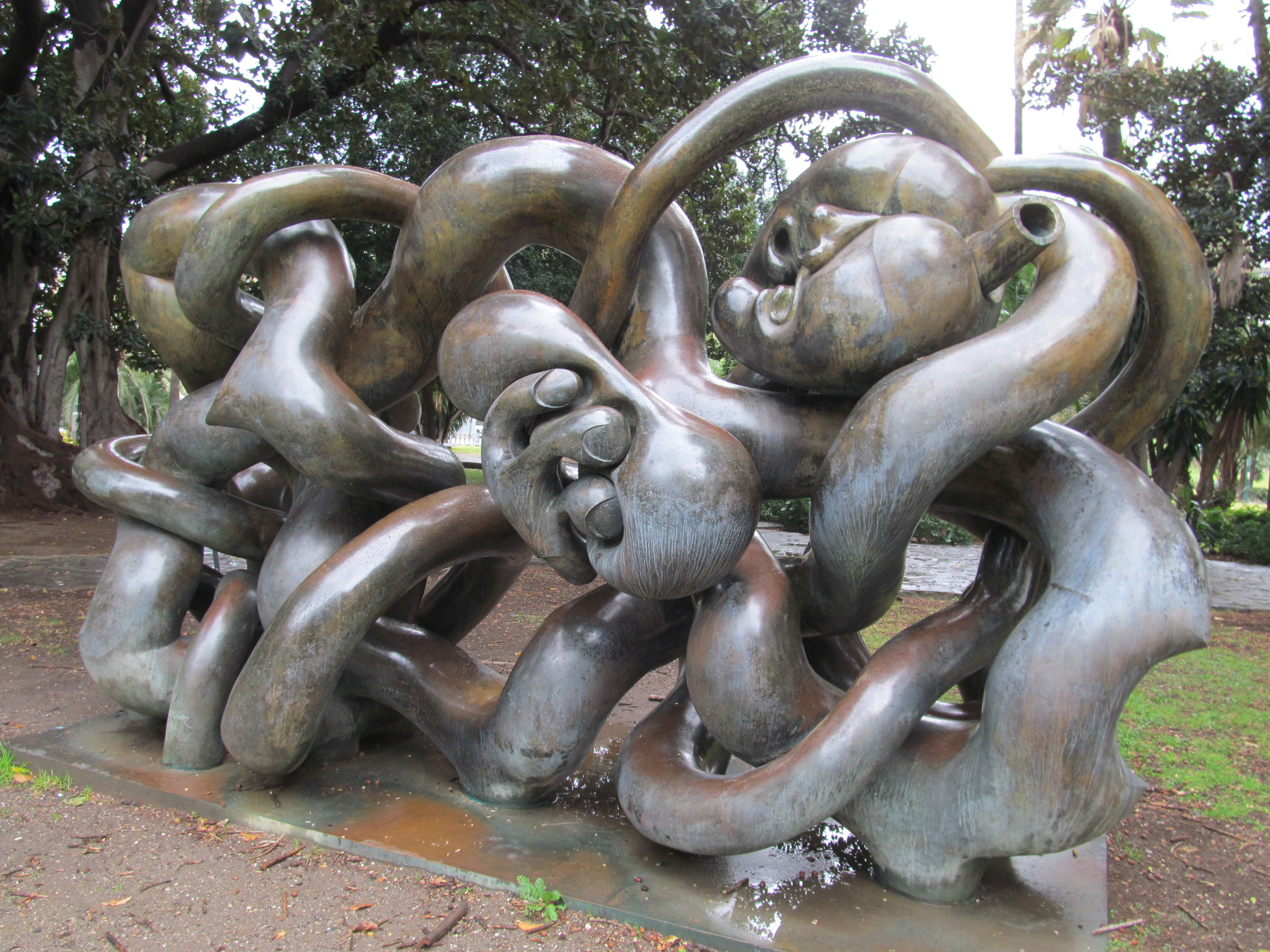
Siéxtasis (1977), in Jardines de Picasso, Málaga, Spain

Works produced in this period included La Maja, Manolete, and Metamorehorses. His work Torero was included in the didactic exhibition Les mains regarding, organised at the Centre Georges Pompidou and intended for the blind. It was touched by thousands of people. Berrocal visited the United States. Espace Berrocal was inaugurated at the Centre Artcurial in Paris.

In 1979 the circuit of museums, galleries and collectors functioned actively, and the use of casting for the production of sculptures now became very important. Berrocal declined an increasing number of invitations in order to concentrate on his work, which became more varied. Works produced in this period included Caballo Casinaide and Omaggio ad Arcimboldo.

=== 1980s ===
In 1980 there were further exhibitions in Caracas and at the Palazzo delle Prigioni Vecchie in Venice. Berrocal was the only artist invited to the I Symposium sur la Sculpture Éditée in Brussels, where he participated in a seminar on multiplied sculpture with students from the University of Louvain. He completed Astronauta, a tribute to Jules Verne, composed of 21 different pieces of jewellery.

In 1981, Berrocal returned to colour: he painted a series of gouaches and silkscreen prints and made two large patchwork hangings for Vogue International. He held an exhibition of his work in New York, which he visited. His portrait by Andy Warhol dates from this trip. For the centenary of Picasso’s birth, he made a medal and a plaque for the artist’s birthplace, which had now become a museum. He made Hoplita, which contained the famous Rubik’s cube, in tribute to the Hungarian mathematician. He held various exhibitions in Europe.

His first exhibition in Kuwait took place in 1982. He produced the series Desperta Ferro, ten pieces on a theme that anticipated the Almogávares, and completed Neon - a sculpture with computer-controlled neon circuits, which gave life to countless combinatorial possibilities of equestrian figures. He undertook his first collaboration with the architect Núñez Yanowski, for the design for the Place Picasso in Marne-la-Vallée, Paris. This led to the creation of Sarabande pour Picasso. He visited New York, where he met the mayor of the city, Ed Koch, who showed great interest in the possibilities of Berrocal’s sculpture in an urban context.

In 1984 the Spanish Ministry of Culture hosted a major exhibition to him at the Palacio de Velázquez in Madrid. An exhaustive historical and critical catalogue was published to accompany the exhibition, with critical texts by Julián Gállego, and Franco Passoni. After Madrid, the exhibition was presented at the Palau Meca in Barcelona, and at Le Botanique in Brussels during Europalia. In 1984, the citizens of Algaidas established the Asociación Amigos de Berrocal, to create a documentation centre and a museum devoted to him; and, after an absence of 25 years, Berrocal returned to the city of his birth.

1986 was a period characterised by the installation of various urban monuments: Sarabande pour Picasso in Paris, Fuente del Limonar, a project for a garden with a fountain in Málaga and, Torso Es for the Olympic Sculpture Park in Seoul. A substantial monograph was published in French by Éditions de la Différence in Paris, with a critical essay by Jean-Louis Ferrier. He gave his first exhibition at the museum in Villanueva de Algaidas, in conjunction with the award of the status of Favourite Son in his native town. He designed the sets and costumes for Bizet’s Carmen at the Arena in Verona.

=== 1990s ===
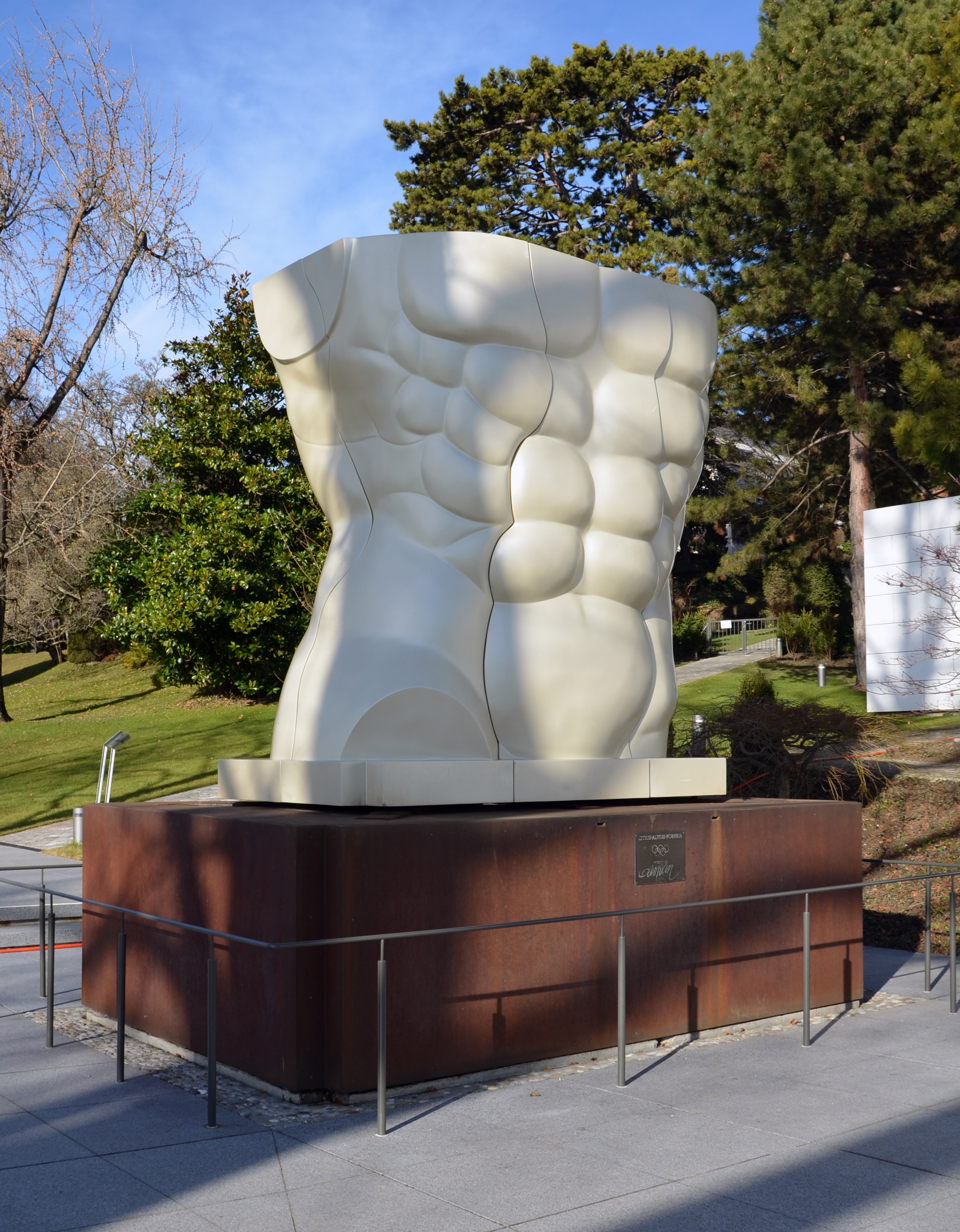
Citius, Altius, Fortius, at the entrance to the Olympic Museum in Lausanne

In 1991 Berrocal received a commission to produce three monumental works for the Spanish celebrations of 1992. The 1992 celebrations were the Exposición Universal in Seville, the Olympics in Barcelona, and the nomination of Madrid as Cultural Capital of Europe. As a result, he produced Doña Elvira, a 6-metre-high (20 ft) sculpture intended for the Auditorium on the Isla de la Cartuja in Seville; Manolona, a 14-metre-high (46 ft) sculpture erected in the Parque Juan Carlos I in Madrid; and Citius, Altius, Fortius, a torso 4 metres high, presented at the Exposición Universal in Seville, before being moved to its final site at the entrance to the Olympic Museum in Lausanne in 1993. He was nominated as a Goodwill Ambassador for UNESCO. In response to technical difficulties encountered when making his monumental sculptures, Berrocal carried out research into new materials and techniques, not hesitating to turn to the most highly specialised industrial sectors in order to learn avant-garde technologies. For example, the three monumental works produced in this period were made using Kevlar and carbon fibre. The application of technologies never before used for artistic purposes like sculpture, is significant in terms of the profound symbiosis between art, science and technology that had always accompanied Berrocal’s sculptural research.

In July 1994, the artist introduced the monument Torso de Luces in Seville. This was made for the company Sevillana de Electricidad to celebrate its centenary. In the autumn, there was a retrospective of multiples at the Cankarjev Dom cultural centre in Ljubljana.

In 1995 Berrocal introduced the Fuente de la Paz in Ibiza. The exhibition Berrocal: Sculture e Disegni was held at the Museo d’Arte Moderna e Contemporanea, Palazzo Forti, in Verona.

From June to September 1996, Berrocal exhibited at the Barchessa Rambaldi, Bardolino. He installed three large monumental sculptures, Pepita in Bordeaux, Alcudia on the campus of the Polytechnic University in Valencia, and Marcelisa in the Marselisborg sculpture park in Denmark.

Between 1997 and 1998 Berrocal took part in the following exhibitions: VI Biennale di Scultura in Monte Carlo Venice, Piccole sculpture, grandi scultori at the Olympic Museum in Lausanne, and Berrocal, Forme et Mouvement, catalogued by Pierre Restany and Robert C. Morgan.

In 1999 he appeared at the ARCO art fair in Madrid. At the same time, there was a large solo exhibition presented at the Centro Cultural Conde Duque in Madrid, which then traveled to Oviedo, where it was seen at the Teatro Campoamor from 15 October to 8 December, and then to Málaga, where it was shown at the exhibition rooms of Unicaja. Berrocal illustrated Emilio Prado’s book The Mystery of Water for the City Council of Madrid. In September he took part in the international exhibition of sculpture and installations OPEN’999 at the Lido in Venice, with El Diestro, a work 3 metres high. In October he presented a solo exhibition at the Galerie Artcurial in Paris. In December he had a large solo exhibition at the Galleria Ghelfi in Verona.

=== 2000s ===
In 2000 Berrocal took part in the Miami Art Fair, the ARCO Art Fair in Madrid, the laying of the foundation stone for the Museo Berrocal in Villanueva de Algaidas, a solo exhibition in Málaga, and another exhibition at the Fondation Veranneman in Belgium. He gave talks in Spain at the University of the Basque Country, Faculty of Fine Arts, Bilbao and the Conference on the Teaching and Learning of Mathematics, Thales, in San Fernando.

He participated in group exhibitions in Hamburg and Como and in several collective and international exhibits such as: International Fair of Contemporary Art (ARCO) in collaboration with the Málaga Provincial Council; the exhibit Golden Imagination: Artists, Silver and Goldsmiths in the Second Half of Italy’s 20th Century, in Ancona; the monographic exhibit, Return to Classicism: The Fusion of Art and Science at the Gallery of the City Hall in the village of his birth, Villanueva de Algaidas; the 36th Abitare el Tempo a Verona; and lastly, an extensive personal retrospective at the Spazio Creativo Cardin in Venice.

In 2002 he took part in the group exhibition, Scultori a Verona 1900–2000, at the Palazzo Forti in Verona, and at the Mostra Internazionale di Arte Contemporanea in Vicenza. In the spring, he was involved in an itinerant exhibition with the name Ecume: Autour de la monnaie unique, which took the design of the Euro as its motif and was organized by the French Government. The Swinger Art Gallery presented the exhibition Berrocal Scultorea. That summer he prepared another extensive exhibit at the Institute Valencià d ́Art Modern (IVAM) that included drawings and sculpture. During that retrospective an important monograph was published. The book was illustrated with photographs of Roberto Bigano and included texts of high intellectual soundness.

In 2003, the retrospective in Valencia continued into the spring, in this case in Málaga at the "Episcopal Palace". It was organized by the Unicaja Benefit Society. Several large sculptures were presented, such as the wooden Richelieu Big, which is two meters in height and can be taken down to 61 pieces. Several monographic and collective exhibits showed the presence of Berrocal in Europe. These included his participation in Milan on the occasion of the Furniture Fair, as well as in Belgium, Venice, Frankfurt and Rome. A collection of jewellery was presented at the Château de Seneffe in Belgium with the title Être ou ne pas être: Peintres ou Sculpteurs? Les bijoux des plus grands. It received a positive response from critics and the public.

During 2004 he showed various works at the International Fair of Contemporary Art (ARCO) in Madrid. He was also in the exhibition Forme Animali–Warning Colours that unified art and science. It was organized by the University of Aquila at the Abbey of Saint Maria di Collemaggio. He also participated at the Milan MIART. In June he took part in the collective exhibit Objects of Desire, Objects of the Artist at the Elvira Conzales Gallery of Madrid. In June and August, an open-air exhibit of monumental sculptures, held in the magnificent Mediterranean landscape of Cap Roig in Costa Brava, was attended by more than 150.000 people. In that show the work Melilla was presented for the first time. The piece was to be permanently placed at the Plaza de las Cuatro Culturas in the city of Melilla.

=== Return to Spain ===
At the end of 2004, Berrocal decided to move to Andalusia permanently. He established a home in his birthplace, Villanueva de Algaidas, in the province of Málaga. There he managed the building of his new studio, a warehouse among olive trees, made to enclose the works he accumulated throughout his career.

During 2005, he wrote and edited his memoirs, and prepared two other publications: a general catalogue of his sculptures, and a separate catalogue of his painting, drawing and graphic works.

Along with ten other sculptors of different nationalities, he participated in the symposium Creator Vesevo organised by the city of Herculaneum, close to Naples. That fall, a powerful and monumental torso made out of volcanic stone was placed on the side of Mount Vesuvius. Berrocal started to move his material possessions from Villa Rizzardi de Negrar in the Valpolicella (Italy), where he had lived and worked for forty years, to his new residence in Spain.

In February 2006 he finished Large Leaning Nude, made of white Kevlar, which now projects as a white cloud over the landscape of Lake Como. That year, he finished writing his memoirs, but continued to work enthusiastically on drawings and sketches for several new works to be built at his studio.

Miguel Berrocal died on 31 May in Antequera.

== Principles of Berrocal’s art ==
The young Berrocal, inspired by the great creative forces of the first half of the 20th century, sought his own artistic path and asked himself: "How to awake people to sculpture?". This question fostered a personal artistic philosophy and esthetic language that can be better understood through seven main points:

- Science as inspiration—Using his academic education in pure sciences and architecture, Berrocal created pieces based on principles derived from mathematics, physics or other marvels of science. They represent the search for beauty through the universal language and the fascination of exploration and of all the invisible principles that hold reality.
- Empty space—In overstepping the standards of traditional sculpture, Berrocal searched for unexplored spaces, penetrating the volumes inside the shapes, going beyond the "surface" of the sculpture: a "sculpture" within the sculpture. "Empty space is alive as full space. Look at it!" (Berrocal)
- Disassembly—The process of researching the shapes inside of volumes provides an important key for the interpretation of Berrocal’s works, the fact that the sculptures can be disassembled: the sculptures are made up of elements that the viewer has to assemble and take apart in order to understand their inner invisible space.
- Interactive esthetics—The consequence of the possibility of disassembly is that the sculpture is designed to be touched, experimented, "observed with the hands". It is an esthetical appropriation through usage, a process that is more similar to drawing an image than to merely looking at it: when you draw you possess that image more profoundly.
- Techniques—As a consequence of disassembly and of his interest in sciences and applied arts, the techniques and technologies needed to develop his complex sculptures became very important for Berrocal. The artist invented many techniques and processes, both intellectual and design driven, as well as for prototyping and material construction, in order to transform his ideas into reality.
- Multiples—The increasing complexity of Berrocal's sculptures and the precision needed to realize them caused the artist to produce them not just as unique pieces, but also in many signed and numbered exemplars. Berrocal, inventing the concept of multiples in sculpture, sought to extend sculptural art’s reach to everybody, just as the painters could do through the reproduction techniques of graphic arts.
- Project—Because of their complexity, all Berrocal’s sculptures are based upon an enormous quantity of documents and materials - the project - that are fundamental to understanding the uniqueness of his creative process and his polyhedric personality. Each project was elaborated during several years and generated thousands of documents that highlighted a profound symbiosis of art, science and technology. The entire project is itself Berrocal’s authentic work of art. Pierre Restany said: "that preliminary material, the study, is the very essence and structure of the work".

== Fundación Escultor Berrocal ==
In order to protect and enhance the vast creative legacy of Berrocal, the Fundación Escultor Berrocal (Berrocal Sculpture Foundation) was established on 22 November 2007 in Madrid by the heirs of Miguel Berrocal, fulfilling his expressed will and culminating the projects which the artist started during his life. The aims of the institution are the preservation, research, and dissemination of the work of Miguel Berrocal, as well as contributions to the advancement of sculpture in all its forms, and to the development and progress of culture and the arts. The foundation is headquartered in the Estudio-Taller Berrocal, the artist's last studio and workshop, in his hometown of Villanueva de Algaidas in the province of Málaga, Spain.

The following seven permanent programs were created:

- Collections management—managing art collections, private, institutional or corporate, that include works of Miguel Berrocal. The purpose is to organize temporal or permanent exhibitions of his works, as well as those from other artists who have a connection with Berrocal.
- Publications—editing and co-editing publications related to the work and entourage of Miguel Berrocal
- Conservation—inventory, logistics, cataloguing and conservation of Miguel Berrocal’s works
- Berrocal archives and documentation center—inventory, cataloguing and conservation of the archives of Miguel Berrocal, with the possibility of creating a library
- Art production—continuing production of Berrocal’s limited editions
- Estudio-Taller Berrocal (Berrocal’s studio and workshop)—conservation and exhibition of Berrocal’s workshop in Villanueva de Algaidas (Málaga, Spain), as well as the creation of activities such as educational workshops to animate it
- Berrocal Museum—promoting and coordinating initiatives for the creation of a Berrocal Museum in Villanueva de Algaidas.

== Berrocal Creative Universe ==
The Berrocal Creative Universe is a 3 place exhibition venue around the work of the sculptor. Opened in 2013, the Museum exhibits paintings and graphical works. The Studio-Workshop allows visitors "to discover the incredibly complex creative endeavors as well as technical process needed to prototype and produce [Berrocal's] disassemblable works." The House-Museum provides visitors with a sense of Berrocal's personality and exhibits works by his many artist friends.

=== Museum ===
The building of the Berrocal Museum, still in development, hosts in its first wing open to public the Center of Interpretation of Water and Contemporary Art. Through an exhibition dedicated to the artist’s monumental fountains. it proposes a different approach to the works of Berrocal, looking to understand how the mind of an artist uses the poetry and complexity of the liquid element in different ways. Another feature of this exhibition is the lesser known graphical works of the sculptor, a small representative selection that shows the strong relationship of the artist with his homeland, with the landscapes of Villanueva de Algaidas: the young artist started out as a painter, wandering in the fields, honing his passion and work, researching his inspiration among the hills of olive trees, in the faces of people, in the light of this ancient territory.

=== Studio-Workshop ===
Visitors can see a selection of Berrocal's sculptures, especially of the first period; his mechanical workshop, where the prototypes were created and the sculptures were finished; as well as his personal studio, revealing the process of research, study, calculations and drawing that kept the artist busy while conceiving the sculptures. The Studio also contains Berrrocal's personal library, with more than 5000 books and a collection of his limited editions.

== Representative works ==
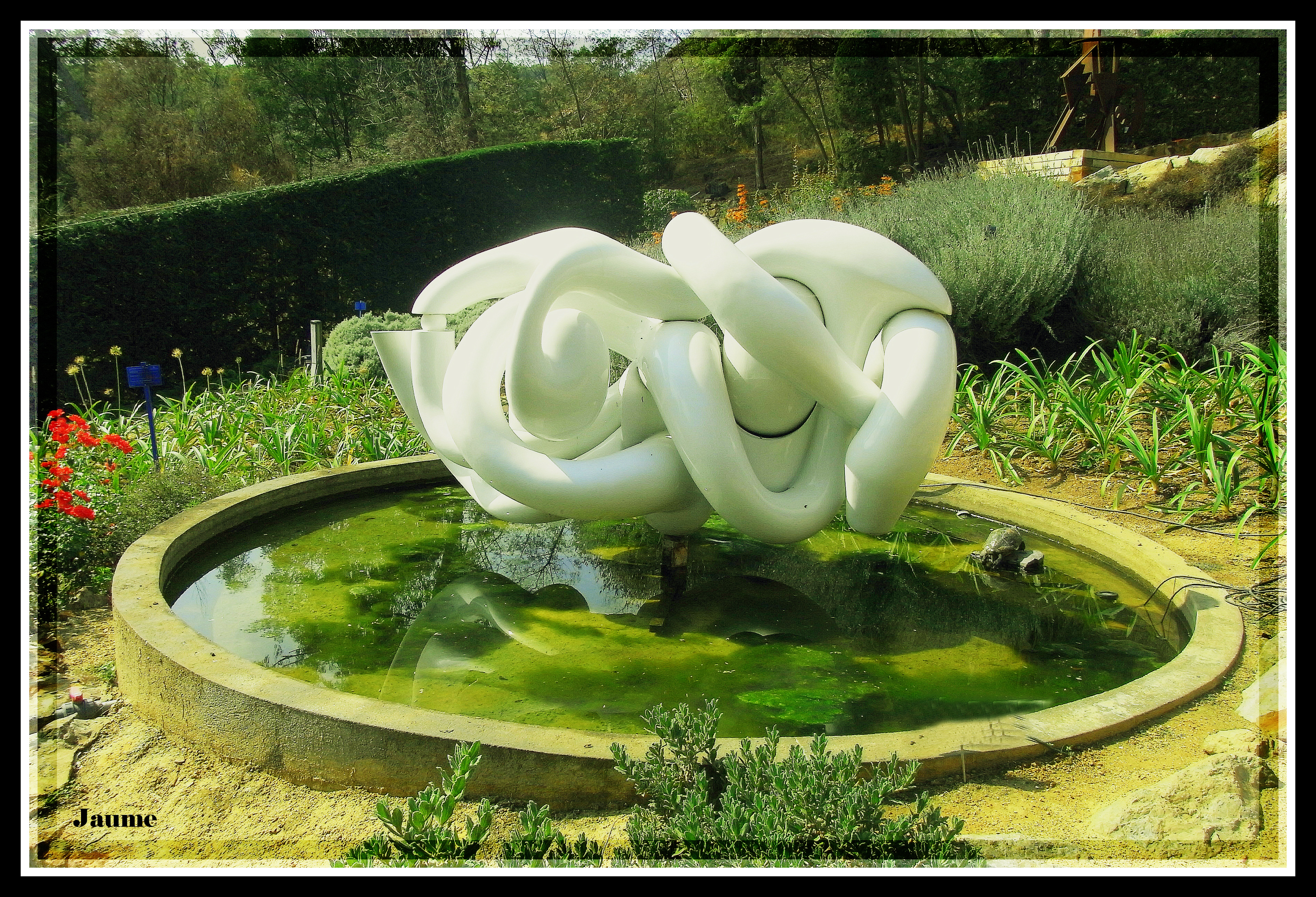
Almudena (1974), at Jardíns de Cap Roig

- Opus 8 Balaustradas 1955-57 Rome
- Opus 28 La Boîte découpée 1959 Rome
- Opus 30 Escultura 1958 Rome
- Opus 31 Grand torse 1959 Rome
- Opus 32 Le bijou 1960 Rome
- Opus 38 Torso her 1961 Crespières
- Opus 43 Pajaro como Leon 1961 Crespières
- Opus 45 Mujer 1961 Crespières
- Opus 50 Via Appia 1961 Crespières
- Opus 55 Les amants 1961 Crespières
- Opus 60 Mercedes 1962 Crespières
- Opus 83 La femme prisonniere 1963 Crespières
- Opus 92 Maria de la O 1962-64 Crespières
- Opus 101 Romeo et Giulietta 1966-67 Crespières-Verona
- Opus 107 Mini David 1967 Negrar
- Opus 114 Goliath 1968-72 Negrar
- Opus 115 Richelieu 1968-73 Negrar
- Opus 117 La menina II 1972 Negrar
- Opus 123 Il cofanetto 1969-75 Negrar
- Opus 129 Monumento a Picasso 1972-74 Negrar
- Opus 130 Almudena 1974 Negrar
- Opus 166 Manymorehorses 1976-79 Negrar
- Opus 167 Omaggio ad Arcimboldo 1976-79 Negrar
- Opus 250-259 Almagovar I – X 1981-83 Negrar
- Opus 397 Manolona 1991-92 Madrid
- Opus 444 Adriano Big 1994 Negrar

== Selected solo exhibitions ==
- 2016 The Insides of Things: The Art of Miguel Berrocal, at the Museum of Mathematics in New York City
- 2009 Berrocal, Guerreros y Toreros, Plaza Nueva, Seville. Organized by Fundación Escultor Berrocal in collaboration with Fundación Unicaja
- 2008 Berrocal, Guerreros y Toreros, Plaza de la Constitución, Málaga. Organized by Fundación Escultor Berrocal in collaboration with Fundación Unicaja
- 2006 Miguel Berrocal, Ferri e bronzi 1955/65, Lorenzelli Arte, Milan
- 2005 Berrocal un malagueño universal, Centro de Exposiciones, Benalmádena, Málaga
- 2005 Venice Design Art Gallery, Venice
- 2004 Berrocal en Cap Roig, esculturas de gran formato, Jardí Botànic de Caixa de Girona, Calella de Palafrugell, Girona
- 2004 Berrocal, Galeria Barcelona, Barcelona
- 2003 Berrocal, Sala del Palacio Episcopal, Málaga
- 2003 Miguel Berrocal, Die Galerie, Frankfurt am Main
- 2003 Piretti Art Gallery, Knokke
- 2002 Berrocal, IVAM, Institut Valencià d'Art Modern, Valencia
- 2000 Sala de Unicaja, Palacio Italcable, Málaga
- 2000 Miguel Berrocal, Sculpturen - juwelen - tekeningen, Fondation Veranneman, Kruishoutem
- 1999 Centro de Arte Moderno Ciudad de Oviedo, Oviedo
- 1999 Centro Cultural del Conde Duque, Madrid
- 1998 Berrocal Forme et Mouvement, Olympic Museum, Lausanne
- 1995 Berrocal Sculture e Disegni 1958-1995, Galleria d'Arte Moderna Palazzo Forti, Verona
- 1994 Multiple Opus 1962 - 1993, Galerija Cankarjev Dom, Ljubljana
- 1993 Interkolumnie, Museion - Museo d'Arte Moderna, Bolzano
- 1991 Berrocal, Reflex Modern Art Gallery, Amsterdam
- 1990 Almogávares, Gallery Guy Pieters, Saint-Martens-Latem
- 1985 Berrocal 1955-1985, Le Botanique, Brussels
- 1984 Antologica Berrocal (1955–1984), Palacio de Velázquez, Parque del Retiro, Madrid. Organized by Ministerio de Cultura
- 1984 Almogávares - Desperta Ferro, Galerie Isy Brachot, Brussels
- 1984 Berrocal, Vingt ans de sculptures editées 1964-1984, Artcurial, Paris; 1982 Gallery Gekkoso, Tokyo
- 1981 Berrocal, sculptures, Arnold Katzen Gallery, New York
- 1980 Berrocal, Circolo Artistico Palazzo delle Prigioni Vecchie, Venice
- 1979 Berrocal Multiple Sculptures, The Art Contact Gallery 2, Coconut Grove, Florida
- 1979 Miguel Berrocal. Obra gráfica y esculturas, Museo Carrillo Gil, Mexico City
- 1979 Berrocal: à la découverte des constructions intérieures, Artcurial, Paris
- 1979 Berrocal, sculptures et multiples, Musée de l'Athénée, Geneva
- 1977 Berrocal, Galería Rubbers, Buenos Aires
- 1977 Berrocal, nuevas esculturas múltiples, Galería Sen, Madrid
- 1976 Artcurial, Paris
- 1976 Indianapolis Museum, Indianapolis
- 1973 Bienal de São Paulo, Pabellón Español, Exposición monográfica, São Paulo
- 1972 Palazzo delle Prigioni Vecchie, Venice
- 1972 Espace Pierre Cardin, Paris
- 1972 Sculptures en or et en argent, Cartier, Munich
- 1970 Ulmer Museum, Ulm
- 1968 Palais des Beaux-Arts, Brussels
- 1968 Galerie Krugier, Geneva
- 1965 Galerie Thomas, Munich
- 1963 Galerie Ziegler, Zürich
- 1962 Three sculptors, Berrocal, Ipoustéguy, Müller, Albert Loeb Gallery, New York
- 1962 Galerie Kriegel, Paris
- 1960 Galleria Apollinaire, Milan
- 1958 Galleria La Medusa, Rome
- 1952 Galería Xagra, Madrid

== Selected literature ==
- 2009 Fokus Figur Focus Figure 30 Jahre. 30 Year of Die Galerie, Die Galerie, Frankfurt am Main, 2009.
- 2009 Berrocal Guerreros y Toreros, Fundación Escultor Berrocal, Málaga, 2009 (exhibition catalogue)
- 2008 Jean-Noël Schifano, Photographies d'Alain Volut, Creator Vesevo, Éditions Gallimard Loisirs, Paris, 2008. The book is dedicated to the outdoor museum Creator Vesevo that was inaugurated in 2005 in the national park of Mount Vesuvius in the south of Italy, and its sculptures. The ten sculptures by the same number of artists were formed out of basalt that had once flown as lava from the crater of the volcano.
- 2008 Carolin Cros, L'art à ciel ouvert, Commandes publiques en France 1983–2007, Flammarion, Paris, 2008. Caroline Cros, inspector of artistic creation and professor at the Ecole du Louvre, and Laurent Le Bon, conservator at the Centre Pompidou, had been in charge of carrying out the public instructions as members of the Delegation for Plastic Arts.
- 2008 Fundación Escultor Berrocal, Berrocal Casa Fuerte Bezmiliana, Área de Cultura, Ayuntamiento del Rincón de la Victoria, Málaga, 2008 (exhibition catalogue)
- 2008 Berrocal Guerreros y Toreros, Fundación Escultor Berrocal, Málaga, 2008 (exhibition catalogue). First publication of the Fundación Escultor Berrocal.
- 2008 Alain Monvoisin, Dictionnaire International de la Sculpture Moderne & Contemporaine, Editions du Regard, Paris, 2008
- 2007 Tony Shafrazi, Carter Ratcliff, Robert Rosenblum, Andy Warhol Portraits, Phaidon, 2007. A comprehensive overview of Warhol's iconic portraits of late 20th-century public figures.
- 2007 Zivile Slektaviciute, Robert Pardo, Robert C. Morgan (Introduction), Luigi Sansone (Introduction), Open Studios, Artefact Pardo Publications, 2007.
- 2006 Miguel Berrocal, Ferri e bronzi 1955/65, Lorenzelli Arte, Milano, 2006. (exhibition catalogue)
- 2005 Berrocal un clásico de la modernidad, Ibercaja, Zaragoza, 2005.
- 2004 Berrocal, Inparce Barcelona, Barcelona, 2004.
- 2004 Jean-Luc Chalumeau, Claude Mollard, Quand les artistes entrent à l'université, Campus Euro(pe) Art. First traveling exposition of contemporary art in the universities, Scéren, 2004.
- 2004 Mercedes, "La rivista delle idee in movimento", Numero 3, Hemels Italia Srl, Firenze, 2004. (magazine)
- 2003 Être ou ne pas Être ... Peintres ou sculpteurs? Les bijoux des plus grands, a.s.b.l. Domaine de Seneffe - Musée de l'orfèvrerie de la Communauté française, 2003.
- 2003 Jacon Baal-Teshuva, Faces Of The Art World, National Center of Photography of Russian Federation, Saint Petersburg, 2003
- 2003 Le Ali, Air Dolomiti In-flight Magazine, March 2003, Air Dolomiti, Gorizia, 2003 (magazine) Article: Alberto Fiz, "Sulle Orme di Michelangelo, In the Footsteps of Michelangelo", Artisti stranieri che hanno scelto l'Italia come patria elettiva, Foreign artists who have chosen Italy as their adopted home
- 2002 Berrocal, IVAM Institut Valencià d'Art Modern, Valencia, 2002. 100 full-page color photographs by Roberto Bigano, theoretical essay by Kosme de Barañano and the art historian Lola Jiménez Blanco, together with literary contributions by Spanish writers and poets José Antonio Muñoz Rojas, Ángela Vallvey and Valentí Puig
- 2002 Arte, Mensile di Arte, Cultura, Informazione, Numero 349, Editoriale Giorgio Mondadori S.p.A., Milano, 2002 (magazine) Article: Beba Marsano, Berrocal e la scultura come alchimia. La classicità, il barocco, la scienza.
- 2001 Esculturas de la UPV, Esculturas del campus de la Universidad Politécnica de Valencia, Universidad Politécnica de Valencia, Valencia, 2001
- 2001 Quién y por qué, Anales de las Artes Plásticas en el siglo XXI, Año 2000, Edita Arte y Patrimonio, S.A., Madrid, 2001
- 2000 Berrocal, Sala Unicaja "Italcable", 2000 (exhibition catalogue)
- 2000 Hans Fonk, Object, Living in Style NO. 17, Hans Fonk Publications bv., Leimuiden, 2000 (magazine)
- 1999 Miguel Berrocal Sculture e Opere su Carta, Giorgio Ghelfi Editore, Verona, 1999 (exhibition catalogue)
- 1999 Berrocal, Centro Cultural del Conde Duque, Madrid, 1999 (exhibition catalogue)
- 1999 Berrocal, Centro de Arte Moderno "Ciudad de Oviedo", 1999 (exhibition catalogue)
- 1998 Berrocal Forme et Mouvement, Olympic Museum, Lausanne, 1998 (exhibition catalogue)
- 1997 Franco Farina, L'anima e le forme, scultori in fonderia, Editrice Compositori, Bologna, 1997 (exhibition catalogue)
- 1996 Miguel Berrocal Sculptures - Multiples, Die Galerie Gesellschaft für Kunsthandel mbH, Offenbach am Main, 1996
- 1996 Miguel Berrocal Skulpturen - Multiples, Die Galerie Gesellschaft für Kunsthandel mbH, Offenbach am Main, 1996
- 1995 Berrocal, Sculture e disegni 1958-1995, Galleria d’Arte Moderna e Contemporanea di Palazzo Forti, Verona, 1995 (exhibition catalogue)
- 1994 Instituto Andaluz de Evaluación Educativa y Formación del Profesorado, Berrocal Escultura en el Aula, Junta de Andalucía, Consejería de Educación y Ciencia, Sevilla, 1994
- 1994 B. de York, Signatures des Artistes du Bronze et fondeurs du XIX ème siècle suivi d'un index de 2500 noms avec références bibliographiques, Editions Collections Livres, Bruxelles, 1994.
- 1992 Suite Olympic Centennial 50 Grand Peintres 50 Great Painters, International Olympic Committee, Lausanne, 1992.
- 1992 Parque Juan Carlos I, Proyecto y Obra 1990–1992, Ayuntamiento de Madrid, Empresa Municipal "Campo de las Naciones", Madrid, 1992.
- 1989 Jean-Louis Ferrier, Berrocal, Éditions de La Différence, Paris, 1989.
- 1989 Philippe Sollers, Les Ambassadeurs, 406 photographies de André Morain, Editions de la Différence, Paris, 1989.
- 1987 Miguel Berrocal Skulpturen, Die Galerie Gesellschaft für Kunsthandel mbH, Offenbach am Main, 1987. Einleitung von Erwin Treu, Beiträge von Klaus-Hartmut Olbricht, Enrico Bellati, Vittorio Sgarbi, Ulrich Willmes.
- 1986 Spagna 75 anni di protagonisti nell'arte, Electa, Milano, 1986.
- 1984 Antologica Berrocal (1955–1984), Ediciones El Viso, Madrid, 1984. Published on occasion of the anthological exhibition Antologica Berrocal 1955–1984, organized by the Spanish Ministry of Culture at the Palacio de Velázquez, Parque del Retiro, Madrid, Spain from October to December 1984. This monographic catalogue containing more than 5000 reproductions was designed directly by the sculptor and is the catalogue raisonné of all the sculptures produced by the artist up until 1984.
- 1982 VIVIR HOY®, "Revista venezolana e internacional de decoración, arquitectura y cultura", Editorial Lei & Zanelli C.A., Caracas, 1982 (magazine) Photographs by Walter Ponchia, Article: Berrocal y su maquina para vivir.
- 1978 Martin Gardner, "Mathematical Games: The sculpture of Miguel Berrocal can be taken apart like an interlocking mechanical puzzle", Scientific American, January 1978
- 1973 Giuseppe Marchiori, La sculpture de Berrocal, La Conaissance, Bruxelles, 1973.
- 1971 Gert von der Osten, Horst Keller, "Kunst der sechziger Jahre Sammlung Ludwig" im Wallraf-Richartz Museum Köln, 1971, 5. erweiterte Auflage, Art of the Sixties, 5th revised edition, Köln, 1971 (exhibition catalogue) 1970 Orangerie Multiples, Köln, 1970 Presents its first series of mini sculpture multiples by Berrocal
- 1969 Katalog 5 Austellungsjahr 1969, Miguel Berrocal, Kestner-Gesellshaft, Hannover, 1969 (exhibition catalogue)
- 1969 Gert von der Osten, Horst Keller, Kunst der sechziger Jahre. im Wallraf-Richartz Museum Köln. 2. erweiterte Auflage, Art of the Sixties, 2nd revised edition, Köln, 1969.
- 1969 Claude Pélieu, ill. Miguel Berrocal, Ce que dit la Bouche d'ombre dans le bronze-étoile d'une tête, Édition Le Soleil Noir, Paris, 1969 1968 Enciclopedia Universal Ilustrada Europeo-Americana, Suplemento Annual, 1963–1964, Espasa-Calpe, S.A., Madrid, 1968
- 1958 Leonardo Sinisgalli, Civiltà delle Macchine, Mayo-Agosto 1958, Roma (magazine).

== See also ==
- Mechanical puzzle
