= José Tapia Brea =

Dominican writer, diplomat (1908–1984)

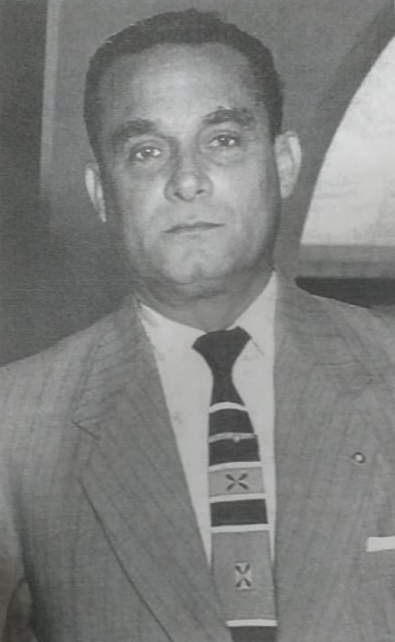
- Born: José Francisco Tapia Brea; 5 April 1908; Salcedo, Dominican Republic
- Died: 19 June 1984 (aged 76); Santo Domingo, Dominican Republic
- Occupation: Writer
- Spouse: Pura Luz Simó Sagredo
- Children: Sonia, Alma, Luz Vanessa y Christian de Jesús

José Francisco Tapia Brea (Salcedo, April 5, 1908-Santo Domingo, June 19, 1984) was a Dominican writer, historian, lawyer, jurist, ambassador and anti-Trujillo fighter. He was part of “group X” led by Ángel Severo Cabral, whose purpose was to eliminate the dictatorship of Rafael Trujillo and take the pertinent measures that would guarantee a democratic process in the country after the execution of the tyrant.

He was in charge of unifying the different groups that emerged in various parts of the country with these same purposes, including the group from the city of Santiago led by Federico Carlos Álvarez. In 1961 he wrote the proclamation that would inform the Dominican people about the execution of the dictator.

Among many of his appointments and distinctions, stands out his appointment as presiding judge of the Court of First Instance of San Cristóbal. In 1996 a street was named in his honor with in the Evaristo Morales Sector of the city of Santo Domingo, capital of the Dominican Republic.

== Early life ==
He was born in Salcedo, which was then a part of La Vega, on April 5, 1909, the son of José Francisco Tapia Calderón and Manuela Brea Pichardo. He was a Law graduate from the Autonomous University of Santo Domingo, on May 25, 1934, having completed his high school studies in the city of La Vega (Dominican Republic), La Vega province.

He married Miss Pura Luz Simó Sagredo 7 in San Francisco de Macorís in 1937 with whom he procreated his daughters Sonia, Alma and Luz Vanessa, later adopting Christian de Jesús.

== Career ==
He was intimately committed to the plot that culminated in the execution of Rafael Trujillo Molina, dictator for thirty-one years of the Dominican Republic.8 He wrote the Proclamation or Manifesto that was to inform the country of the death of the tyrant once the plan was executed. culminating in his death.9 10

He was part of the "group X" led by Ángel Severo Cabral whose purpose was to make the pertinent agreements that would guarantee a democratic process after the primary plan that would culminate in the death of the dictator was executed. He was in charge of unifying the different groups that emerged in other parts of the country with these same purposes, among them the group from the city of Santiago led by Federico Carlos Álvarez.

In approximately 1932, at the beginning of the tyranny, he participated in a student demonstration on the grounds of the Autonomous University of Santo Domingo, in protest against the dictatorial political regime of Rafael Trujillo. The demonstration was broken up with "macanazos" by the regime's Mounted Cavalry and he ended up in prison. He was taken to the "Torre del Homenaje" of the Ozama Fortress, then used as a jail for "political" prisoners. There he remained for about a month with the other young people who suffered the same fate. There they founded one of the first anti-Trujillo cells in the country.11

In 1945 he was appointed Prosecutor (civil servant) of the Province of Duarte and in 1947 he was appointed Presiding Judge of the Court of First Instance of San Cristóbal (Dominican Republic). There, in a gesture of honesty and courage, it responsibly discharged, blameless, Mr. Rafael Lambertus Soto, a land surveyor from the region, unjustly accused of theft by direct orders of President Rafael Trujillo. This, as punishment for having refused to hand over his daughter, whom he had fallen in love with. This gesture could have cost the life of Mr. Tapia by contravening a direct order from the tyrant, showing his integrity. After this, Tapia submitted his resignation from office, and immediately went with his family to San Francisco de Macorís, seeking to avoid the dire consequences of his disobedience. Then he sent a letter in laudatory terms to Rafael Trujillo extolling his sense of "justice" to justify his actions and free himself from persecution. It was made the intention never again to accept another position or public office that could compromise his integrity and dignity. Which he did until the disappearance of the tyranny. 12

On May 31, 1961, in the early morning after the execution of Rafael Trujillo, he was surprised by the regime's henchmen at his home in San Francisco de Macorís, and taken as a prisoner to the Military Fortress, along with other men who also they had once been against the regime. There they remained in deplorable conditions until the execution of Rafael Trujillo was made public.

He was one of the founders of the patriotic movement Unión Cívica Nacional (Dominican Republic), which, as a result of the death of the dictator, brought together the majority of the Dominican people with the aim of expelling the remnants of the Trujillato from the country.13 This purpose was achieved. after large mobilizations where Mr. Tapia exposed his life more than once, placing himself "bare-chested" as a pacifier in front of the army, who armed with machine guns.

He died in Santo Domingo, victim of a car accident, on June 19, 1984.

== Literary works ==
He wrote several historical books, including: "The hero of the two wars of Independence", "Life of Olegario Tenares", "Biographical synthesis on Juan Pablo Duarte" and others, as well as numerous journalistic articles on various topics of national interest. In addition, he wrote a book of poems entitled, "My lyrical chest"

He successfully practiced his profession as a lawyer, both in civil and commercial, as well as criminal and land matters, mainly in San Francisco de Macorís and then throughout the national sphere, founding in Santo Domingo, together with his daughter, Sonia Tapia de Tejada, Tapia Brea & Tejada C by A Company, specializing in real estate services and legal matters.
