= Estefanía Torres Martínez =

Spanish politician

Estefanía Torres
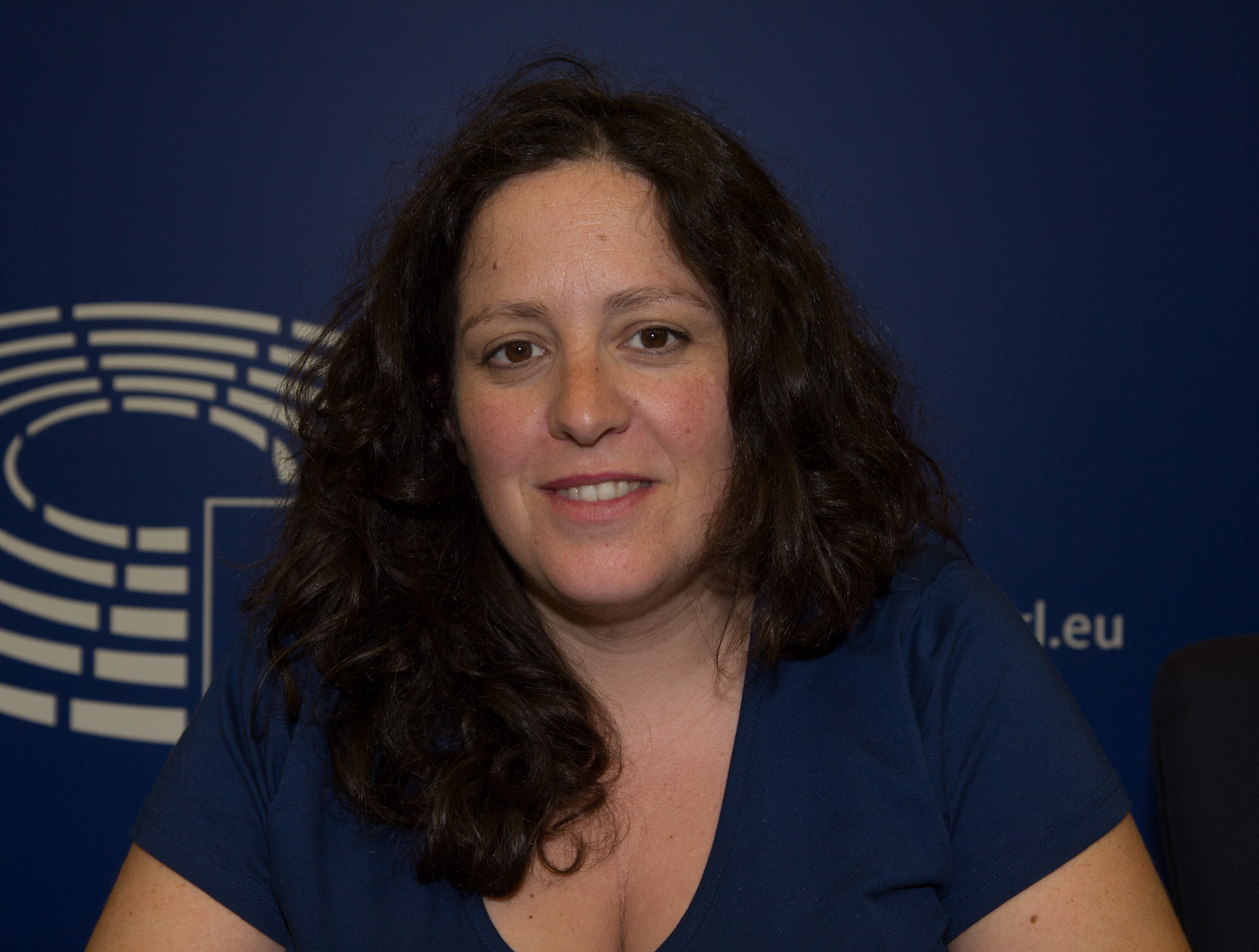

Member of the European Parliament
- In office 25 March 2015 – 1 July 2019
- Constituency: Spain

Personal details
- Born: 27 April 1982 (age 43) Cudillero, Spain
- Party: Podemos
- Occupation: Politician

Estefanía Torres Martínez (born 1982) is a Spanish politician. She served as Member of the European Parliament between 2015 and 2019.

== Biography ==
Born on 27 April 1982 in Cudillero, Asturias.

A candidate of Podemos at the 2014 European Parliament election in Spain, she became a member of the European Parliament on 25 March 2015, covering the vacant seat left by Pablo Echenique. She served as member of the Committee on the Environment, Public Health and Food Safety and the Delegation for Relations with the People's Republic of China
