= Estefanía Domínguez Calvo =

Spanish triathlete

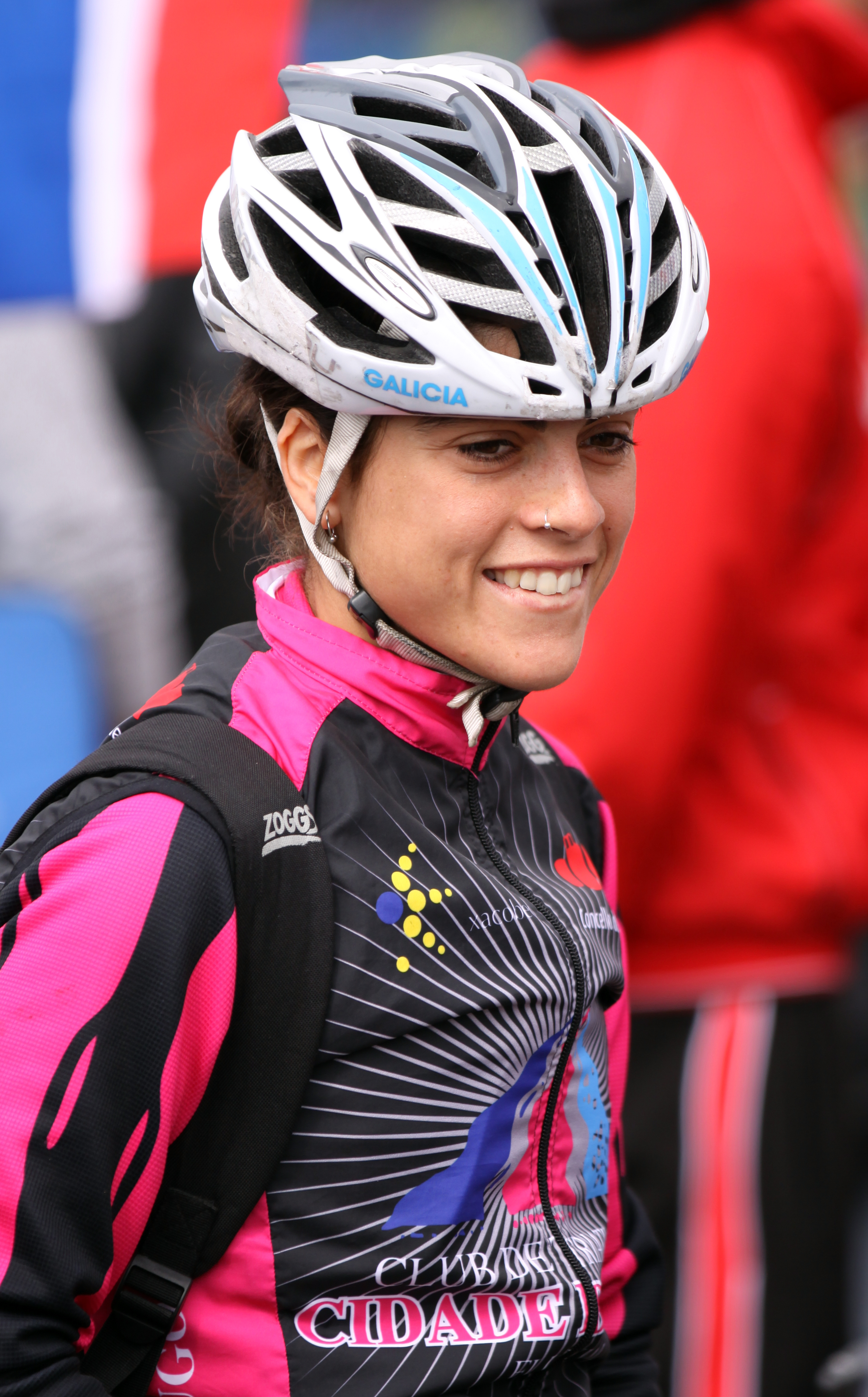
Estefania Dominguez at the European Cup in Antalya, 2011.

Estefanía (Fani) Domínguez Calvo (born 8 February 1984 in Badajoz) is a Spanish professional triathlete, 2009 Galician Duathlon Champion, and 2010 Galician Aquathlon Champion. She represents the Club Triatlon Cidade de Lugo Fluvial.

Estefanía Domínguez is a qualified PE teacher and studied Ciencias de la Actividad Física y deporte.

== ITU Competitions ==
In the three years from 2008 to 2010, Domínguez took part in 11 ITU events and achieved 2 top ten positions. The following list is based upon the official ITU rankings and the ITU Athletes's Profile Page. Unless indicated otherwise, the following events are Olympic Distance Triathlons and refer to the Elite category.

| Date | Competition | Place | Rank |
|---|---|---|---|
| 2008-04-19 | Premium European Cup | Pontevedra | 25 |
| 2009-04-05 | European Cup | Quarteira | 24 |
| 2009-05-17 | Premium European Cup | Pontevedra | 32 |
| 2009-06-14 | European and Pan American Cup (Iberoamerican Championships) | Ferrol | 11 |
| 2009-07-25 | European Cup and Balkan Championships | Varna | DNF |
| 2009-09-26 | European Cup | Mar Menor | 19 |
| 2010-01-10 | Pan American Cup | Viña del Mar | 14 |
| 2010-01-15 | Pan American Cup | La Paz | 5 |
| 2010-05-28 | FISU World University Championships | Valencia | 7 |
| 2010-06-12 | Premium European Cup | Pontevedra | 17 |
| 2010-08-21 | Sprint World Championships | Lausanne | 35 |
| 2011-04-03 | European Cup | Antalya | 16 |
| 2011-04-09 | European Cup | Quarteira | 15 |
| 2011-05-08 | World Cup | Monterrey | 58 |
| 2011-05-29 | Premium European Cup | Brasschaat | 28 |
