= Cuevas de San Marcos =

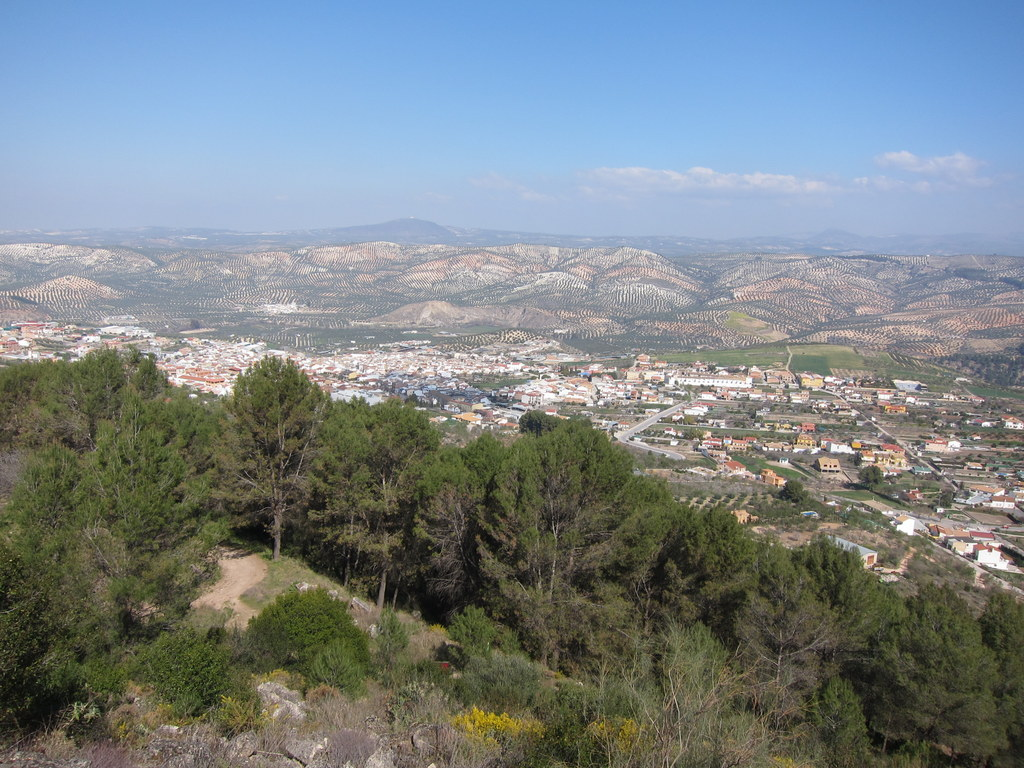

- Coat of arms

- Location in Andalusia Cuevas de San Marcos (Andalusia) Cuevas de San Marcos (Spain)
- Coordinates: 37°03′N 04°23′W
- Sovereign state: Spain
- Autonomous community: Andalusia
- Province: Málaga
- Comarca: Comarca de Antequera

Government

Area
  - Total: 37 km^{2} (14 sq mi)
- Elevation: 422 m (1,385 ft)

Population (2025-01-01)
  - Total: 3,647
  - Density: 99/km^{2} (260/sq mi)
- Demonym: Cuevachos
- Time zone: UTC+1 (CET)
  - Summer (DST): UTC+2 (CEST)
- Postal code: 29210
- Website: www.cuevasdesanmarcos.es

Cuevas de San Marcos is a town and municipality in the province of Málaga, part of the autonomous community of Andalusia in southern Spain. The municipality is situated in the northern part of the Antequera region, on the border of the province of Córdoba from the river valley of Genil to the Sierra Malnombre and Camorro de Cuevas Altas. It is also located within the comarca of Nororma. It borders the provinces of Granada and Cordoba to the north, the comarcas of La Axarquía to the south and Antequera to the west. The town is situated at an altitude of 420 meters above sea level.

By road Cuevas de San Marcos is located 88 kilometers from Málaga and 487 km from Madrid. It is a farming village, with a predominance of olive growing and oil production of the "Hojiblanca" variety. Its name comes from its patron saint, Mark the Evangelist, and its famous Cave of Belda.

Cuevas de San Marcos has a population of approximately 4,000 residents. It covers an area of about 37.50 km^{2}. The natives are called Cuevachos.

== History ==
The history of the town of Cuevas de San Marcos traces its beginnings to 1806. Formerly known as Cuevas Altas, its separation from Antequera was what led to his establishment as an independent municipality, receiving the new name as it is known today. At the foot of Sierra Camorro, sits this villa, which has all the progress of life that has taken place throughout history. Before it was known as Ciudad de Belda. It stands at the foot of a mountain, where there is a cave called Belda, which is located on the north side of the town and belonging to mountain range called the "Sierra del Camorro." The mountain range consists of limestone and marls from the Jurassic period at a height of 907 meters. Situated on the summit of this mountain is a Paleolithic site leaving open the possibility in the past the existence of a castle and its forts, which were destroyed by the Moors. Within the cave, the existence of at least three lakes and numerous galleries is known of, which shows kilometers of stalactites, formed over decades. In the first lake, remains of an ancient burial site were found and in the other two lakes pottery was found. Both can found in the City Museum or the Provincial Archaeological Museum.

== See also ==
- List of municipalities in Málaga
