= Estefanía Beltrán de Heredia =

Spanish agricultural engineer and politician

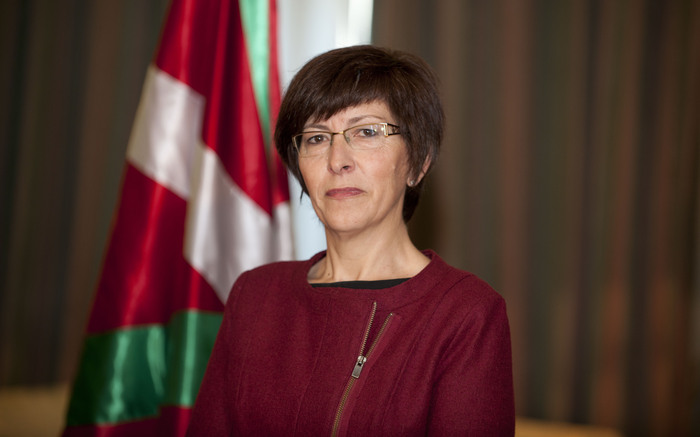

Spokesperson of the Basque Group in the Senate
- Incumbent
- Assumed office September 25, 2020
- Preceded by: Jokin Bildarratz

Minister of Security of the Basque Government
- In office December 14, 2012 – September 5, 2020
- President: Iñigo Urkullu
- Preceded by: Idoia Mendia
- Succeeded by: Josu Erkoreka

Senator in the Spanish Parliament by designation of the Basque Parliament
- Incumbent
- Assumed office September 25, 2020

Personal details
- Born: 28 March 1960 (age 66) Valle de Arana, Spain
- Party: Basque Nationalist Party
- Education: University of Navarra
- Occupation: Agricultural Technical Engineer

Estefanía Beltrán de Heredia Arroniz (Valle de Arana, Álava, March 28, 1960) is a Spanish agricultural engineer and politician of Basque nationalist ideology.

== Biography ==
Born in Ullibarri Arana, a small village in the municipality of Arana, with a little more than 200 inhabitants, located in the east of Alava, near Navarre. She lives in Vitoria.

=== Career ===
Since December 2012, she has been a security advisor to the Basque government. Previously, she was a Basque parliamentarian for five years in two different phases (1998-2001 and 2005-2007), while in the Basque elections of 2012 she was elected fourth on the Basque Nationalist Party (Spanish: Partido Nacionalista Vasco, PNV) list for Álava. In addition, she was a regional deputy for agriculture (2007-2011). He was also a member of the Araba Buru Batzar (2004-2007).
