= Estefanía Durán Ortiz =

Mexican politician

- Born: 10 November 1969 (age 56); State of Mexico, Mexico
- Occupation: Politician
- Political party: PRI

Estefanía Durán Ortiz (born 10 November 1969) is a Mexican politician from the Institutional Revolutionary Party. In 2012 she served as Deputy of the LXI Legislature of the Mexican Congress representing the State of Mexico.
