= Luis Castellanos Tapias =

- Born: Molagavita, Santander, Colombia
- Other names: Luis Castellanos
- Occupation(s): Attorney, politician, writer

Death: September 22, 1968 Luis Castellanos Tapias (born in Molagavita, Santander) was a Colombian attorney (Universidad Externado de Colombia), historian, politician, publisher and writer.

== Biography ==
Castellanos Tapias (who studied history with José Fulgencio Gutiérrez, historian from Bucaramanga, Santander, and author of the historical study "Galán y los Comuneros"), published in 1962 a novel that has as its main historical reference the revolt of the Comuneros (1781) in the Viceroyalty of New Granada, El Alzamiento ("The Uprising"). Castellanos Tapias is also the author of at least two other unpublished novels, El Amo, or "The Master" and La Muerte del Juéz Barton or "The Death of Judge Barton". Records show him also as the author of a technical report and a census on the tobacco industry in Colombia for Instituto Nacional de Fomento Tabacalero (INTABACO).

Castellanos was a member of the conservative party and occupied several provincial and national positions, among them Secretary of Government (Departmental Interior Secretary) under Santander Governor Rafael Ortiz Gonzales during the period leading to the political crisis of April 1948. From his governmental positions Castellanos Tapias was instrumental, together with other Santander leaders, in promoting the founding of the Universidad Industrial de Santander (UIS), a prominent Colombian university, of which he was the third rector from November 1949 to March 1951. After studying industrial statistics with an ONU scholarship in the United States and Canada, he intervened in the founding and was the leading executive of the Departamento Nacional de Estadística (National Department of Statistics), the forerunner of today's DANE (Departamento Administrativo Nacional de Estadísticas).

Castellanos was also leading assistant to the minister of Agriculture and on occasion, acting Minister of Agriculture. Later, he was the leading executive (Gerente General) of the Instituto Nacional de Fomento Tabacalero (INTABACO). Castellanos was founder and publisher of the short-lived "La Nación Agrícola" magazine. Towards the end of his life, he was also a notary, judge and the president of the Directorio Conservador in Barrancabermeja, Santander. While living in Barrancabermeja, Castellanos Tapias was made a full member ("Miembro de Número") of the Academy of History of Santander and was chosen to preside over the founding of the Centro de Historia de Barrancabermeja, the local chapter of the Academy of History of Santander.

== El Alzamiento ==
The 1962 novel El Alzamiento shows the influences of the French Annales school of historiography, that came to Castellanos Tapias through his history teacher at Colegio de Santander, José Fulgencio Gutiérrez. The epic 1781 uprising of the peasants from Santander and Boyacá against Spanish abuses is depicted through the lives of a family of humble tobacco growers. When they run afoul of the Spanish taxation agents, the crop is destroyed, their home is planted with salt and burned to the ground, and the head of the family is thrown in jail. Destitute, the wife descends into madness and goes around town chanting the local couplets that by then foretell the coming insurrection. With an eye to the social forces bubbling up to threaten Spanish colonial power and faithful to historical detail, the novel fleshes out the characters of the women and men that led the insurrection and suffered the ensuing repression afterwards. The priests preach humility while averting their eyes away from the authorities' crimes. The "criollo" middle classes, the future "heroes" of the national independence from Spain, take advantage of the triumphant movement to help themselves, later on turning their backs and delivering the peasant leaders to be executed. Amid despair and hopelessness, the novel ends with the peasant youngsters on the verge of a guerrilla attack on incoming Spanish forces, a clear reference to the political dynamics of Colombia which by the time the novel was written had taken the form of insurgent guerrilla movements.

== See also ==
- José Antonio Galán
- Revolt of the Comuneros
- History of Colombia
- Manuela Beltrán
