= Estefanía Tapias =

Colombian climatologist

Estefanía Tapias (born 19 May 1988) is a Colombian city climate researcher and entrepreneur active in Switzerland.

== Career ==
In 2012 Estefania Tapias completed a degree in architecture at the Polytechnic University of Turin, and in 2016 she received a doctorate in urban climatology and future cities at ETH Zürich. She was a lecturer in the topic at the ETH from 2013 to 2016. She applied big data to research into the influence of climatic and architectural conditions on the quality of life in cities.

Tapias also works in the Future Cities Laboratory at the Singapore-ETH Centre and on her own “Urban Climate & Information Cities” project.

Tapias co-developed the first series of Massive Open Online Courses (MOOC) on Future Cities on edX.

Since 2016, Tapias has been part of the World Economic Forum Global Shapers network.

Tapias co-founded the Zürich networking and co-working company WeSpace in 2018 with Laura Seifert, providing "coworking and community space designed by women for women", aiming to " provide an inspirational space to work, socialize and network as well as a community that empowers women." The company was sold and Tapias left WeSpace GmBH on 21 January 2020 as a partner and managing director.

== Honors ==
- Top 100 Digital Shapers in Switzerland, Bilanz, 2019
- Top 100 Digital Shapers in Switzerland, Bilanz, 2018
- Forbes 30 under 30 Europe 2018: Science and Healthcare
