= Villanueva de Tapia =

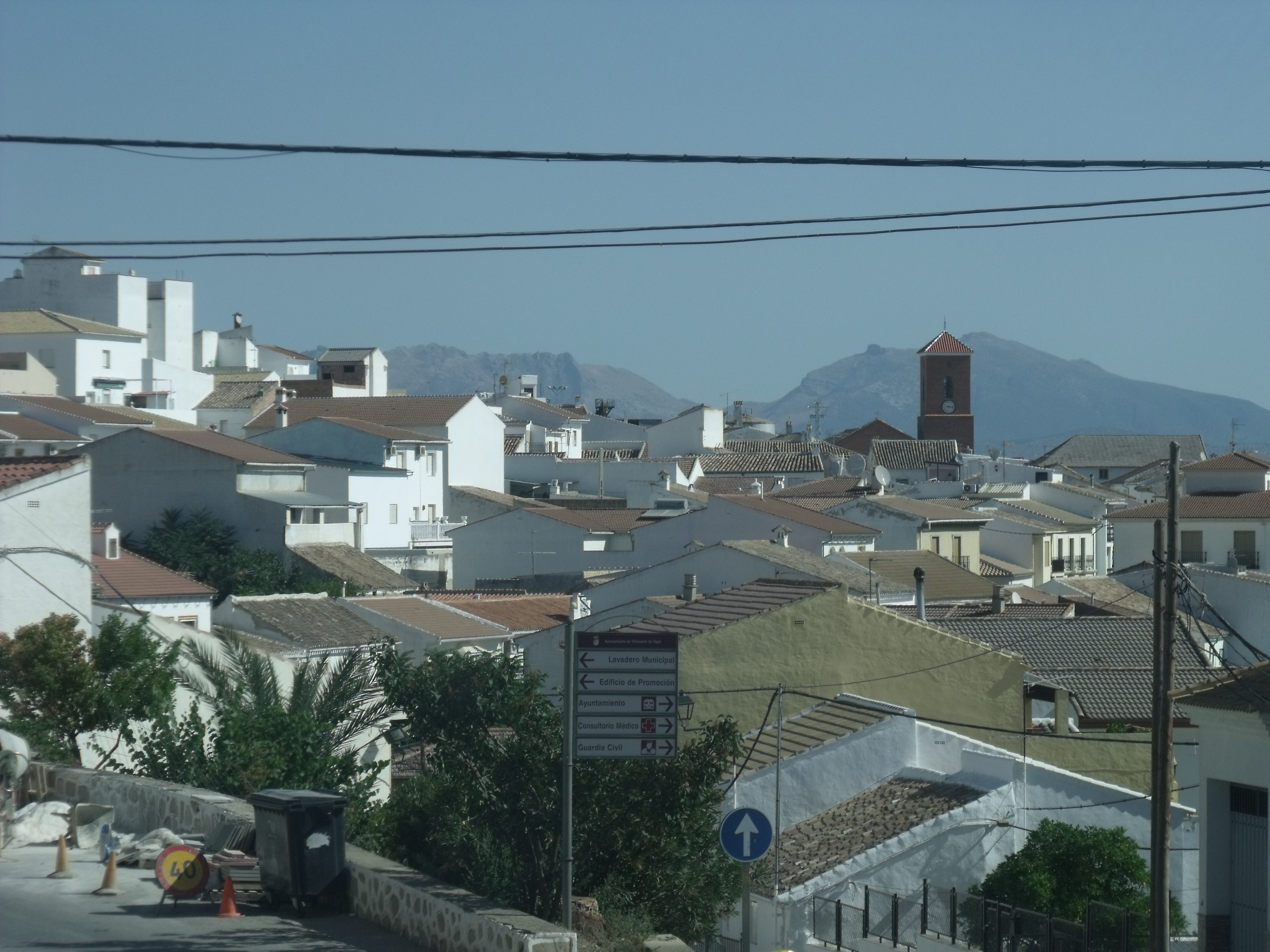

- Coat of arms

- Location in Spain.
- Coordinates: 37°11′N 4°20′W
- Sovereign state: Spain
- Autonomous community: Andalusia
- Province: Málaga

Area
  - Total: 22.12 km^{2} (8.54 sq mi)
- Elevation: 662 m (2,172 ft)

Population (2025-01-01)
  - Total: 1,391
  - Density: 62.88/km^{2} (162.9/sq mi)
- Time zone: UTC+1 (CET)
  - Summer (DST): UTC+2 (CEST)
- Website: www.villanuevadetapia.org

Villanueva de Tapia is a town and municipality in the Province of Málaga, part of the autonomous community of Andalusia in southern Spain. It is located in the comarca of Antequera. The municipality is situated approximately 67 kilometres from Málaga. It has a population of approximately 1,700 residents. The natives are called Tapienses or Entricheros.

== In popular culture ==
The video game trilogy Injection π23 takes place in Villanueva de Tapia.

== See also ==
- List of municipalities in Málaga
