= Archidona =

- Municipality
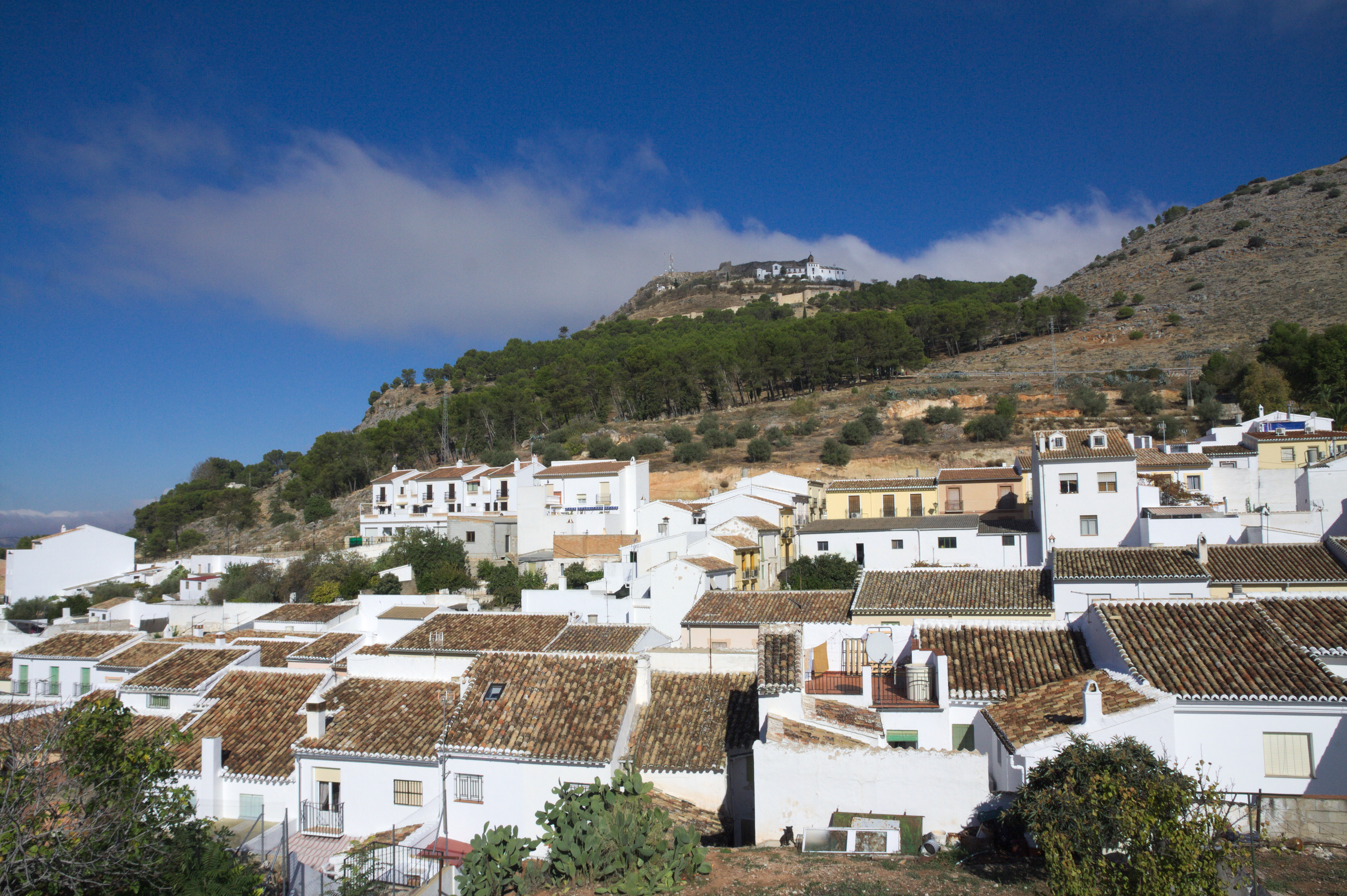
- Archidona

- Flag Coat of arms

- Municipal location in the Province of Málaga

- Location in Spain Archidona (Andalusia) Archidona (Spain)
- Coordinates: 37°06′N 4°23′W
- Sovereign state: Spain
- Autonomous community: Andalusia
- Province: Málaga
- Comarca: Comarca of Antequera

Government

Area
  - Total: 185.59 km^{2} (71.66 sq mi)
- Elevation: 666 m (2,185 ft)

Population (2025-01-01)
  - Total: 8,105
  - Density: 43.67/km^{2} (113.1/sq mi)
- Demonym: Archidoneses
- Time zone: UTC+1 (CET)
  - Summer (DST): UTC+2 (CEST)
- Postal code: 29300
- Website: www.archidona.es

Archidona is a town and municipality in the province of Málaga, part of the autonomous community of Andalusia in southern Spain. It is the center of the comarca of Nororiental de Málaga and the head of the judicial district that bears its name. It earned the title of city in 1901.

It covers an area of 187 km^{2} extending from the east side of the Hoya of Antequera. The city is located at a height of 666 meters in the foothills of the Sierra de Gracia. With 8,858 inhabitants, Archidona is the most populous municipality in the comarca. The population is concentrated in the main urban centers of the same name and in Salinas, Estación de Archidona and Huertas del Río. The municipality is situated approximately 50 kilometers from the city of Málaga and 20 km from Antequera.

Archaeological finds confirm the presence of settlers in the area from the Lower Paleolithic. The oldest permanent settlement correspond to Escua, founded by the Phoenicians, and Ulisis, inhabited by Turduli and Romans. During the Muslim period, Medina Arxiduna achieved notoriety by becoming the capital of Rayya Cora. In his alcazaba he was proclaimed Emir Abd al-Rahman I in 756, leading to the establishment of the Emirate of Cordoba in al-Andalus. After the Christian conquest in 1462, the town remained under the seigniorial jurisdiction of the House of Osuna.

The city was declared a Historic-Artistic Site in 1980 for Baroque urban and architectural heritage. The municipality is home to several archaeological sites from different periods and areas of ecological interest such as the Natural Lagoons Reserve of Archidona and Hoz de Marín. It is also the headquarters of the Andalusian and Mediterranean Cinema Displays.

The natives are called Archidoneses.

== History ==
=== Origin of name ===
There are different hypotheses about the etymological origin Archidona. According to J. H. Xavarino, the current name come from the pre-Roman expression arri-exi-dun-a, which means "the one with stone fence." He also pointed to a Latin origin of the expression Arx Domina or Arcis Domina, which means "lady of the heights", but no evidence has been found that supports this.

== See also ==
- List of municipalities in Málaga
