= Miss World Málaga =

- Formation: 1951
- Type: Beauty pageant
- Headquarters: London, England
- Location: Málaga, Spain
- Official language: Spanish, English
- President: Julia Morley
- Key people: Guillermo Escobar, Juan Delgado, Jesús Bueno
- Website: Official website

The Miss World Spain Málaga contest is a regional beauty pageant of Spain and has been held since 2013. It is responsible for selecting local's representative to the Miss World pageant (amongst others).

Miss World is part of the Big Four international beauty pageants.

Miss World Málaga pageant is traditionally held in Spring, preceded by months of 'Fast Track' events, including the awarding of corporate prizes.

== Titleholders ==
First year winner's Cristina Mesa is the reigning Miss World Málaga 2013. She came 2nd Runner-Up for Miss World Spain's title on Saturday 29 June 2013 in Lago Martiánez (Martiánez Pools) of Puerto de la Cruz, Tenerife; becoming a successful model after.

Year	Municipality	Miss World Málaga	Aged	Location	Miss World Spain
2014	Marbella	Adriana Sánchez	22	Teatro Fortuna, Hotel THB Torrequebrada, Benalmádena	Top 8 & 'Beauty with a purpose' award finalist
2013	Málaga Capital	Cristina Mesa	18	Teatro Fortuna, Hotel THB Torrequebrada, Benalmádena	2nd Runner-Up

=== Municipalities by tally ===
Rank	Municipality	Miss World Málaga	1st Runner-Up	2nd Runner-Up	Finalists	Fast Track	Semi-Finalists
	Ronda	1 (2015)	-	-	1 (2014)	2 (2015)	-
	Marbella	1 (2014)	-	-	-	2 (2014)	-
	Guaro	-	1 (2015)	-	1 (2014)	1 (2015)	-
	Alameda	-	1 (2014)	-	-	-	1 (2015)
	Torrox	-	-	1 (2014)	-	1 (2014)	-
	Málaga Capital	-	-	-	2 (2015, 2014)	1 (2014)	-
	Vélez Málaga	-	-	-	1 (2015)	1 (2015)	-
	Coín	-	-	-	1 (2015)	-	-
	Antequera	-	-	-	1 (2014)	-	-
	Nerja	-	-	-	-	1 (2014)	-
	Mijas	-	-	-	-	1 (2014)	-
	Alhaurín de la Torre	-	-	-	-	-	1 (2015)
	Alhaurín el Grande	-	-	-	-	-	1 (2015)
	Fuengirola	-	-	-	-	-	1 (2015)
	Rincón de la Victoria	-	-	-	-	-	1 (2015)
	Benalmádena	-	-	-	-	-	-
	Cártama	-	-	-	-	-	-
	Estepona	-	-	-	-	-	-
	Manilva	-	-	-	-	-	-
	Torremolinos	-	-	-	-	-	-

== Miss World Málaga 2014 ==
The second edition was held on Saturday 3 May 2013 again in Benalmádena, in the Teatro Fortuna (Fortune's Theatre) of the Hotel THB Torrequebrada.

The show was hosted by Miss World Spain 2012 and top finalist in Miss World pageant Aránzazu Estévez.

Mister World 2007 Juan García crowned the new winner at the final night.

Marbella's Adriana Sánchez ended as the reigning Miss World Málaga 2014.

Jorge González, 2nd place in Telecinco's successful talent show La Voz (The Voice), performed at the finale.

=== Placements ===
Winner contestant was Adriana Sánchez from Marbella. Ending as 1st Runner-Up was Caroline Rueda from Alameda and 2nd Runner-Up was Andrea De Cozar from Torrox. A total of 17 women finalists competed for the crown. After 400 girls auditioned all over the province and 30 semi-finalists called for the final round, the list of 20 finalists for 2014 ended as follows:

Final Result	Contestant
Miss World Málaga 2014	Marbella - Adriana Sánchez (22)
1st Runner-Up	Alameda - Caroline Rueda (20)
2nd Runner-Up	Torrox - Andrea De Cozar (19)
3rd Runner-Up	Ronda - Carmen Recio (24)
4th Runner-Up	Málaga Capital - Paula Medina (19)
5th Runner-Up	Guaro - Ángela Guerrero (18)
6th Runner-Up	Antequera - Yolanda Galisteo (22)
Top 17 (alphabetical order by sash)	Alhaurín de la Torre - Catalina Cimpineanu (18); Benalmádena - Felicidad Millán (19); Coín - Cristina Avilés (24); Estepona - Alba Román (17); Fuengirola - Macarena Pastor (22); Manilva - Isabel Moreno (21); Mijas - María Calvente (20); Nerja - Naila García (21); Torremolinos - Beatriz Company (21); Vélez Málaga - Daniela Kewitsch (21)

- Contestants from Alhaurín el Grande (Norma Ruiz), Cártama (Remedios Gómez) and Rincón de la Victoria (Cristina Bustamante) withdrawn from the competition for personal reasons.

== Miss World Málaga 2013 ==
The very first edition of the pageant was held on Friday 14 June 2013 in Benalmádena, in the Teatro Fortuna (Fortune's Theatre) of the Hotel THB Torrequebrada.

Hosts of the finale were Melanie Agudo and Iván Rebolledo.

Yanela Brooks top finalist in Telecinco's successful talent show La Voz (The Voice), performed at the final evening.

The panel of judges was as follows:

- Luis Gordo (Revista entre!'s Magazine Director)
- Agustín Martín (New York Hairs Salons Director)
- María Llorens (Lady Nails / Trinity Beauty Spain Salons Director)
- Patricia Nahmad (Haute Couture Fashion Designer)
- Miriam Benzaquen (HT Arroyotour Travel Agency's Director)
- Noelia Moccia (Personal Shopper and Fashion Blogger)
- Jesús Bueno (Community Manager)
- Sandra Rojo (Bailly Bijoux Spain Fashion Label's Director)
- Jacinto Gómez (Art Director)
- Dora Martínez (Dora Make Up School's Director) - Chairwoman of the Jury

=== Placements ===
Winner contestant was Cristina Mesa from Málaga Capital. Ending as 1st Runner-Up was Carmen Inongo also from Málaga Capital and 2nd Runner-Up was Paola Velasco from Vélez Málaga. A total of 10 women finalists competed for the crown.

Final Result	Contestant
Miss World Málaga 2013	Málaga Capital - Cristina Mesa (18)
1st Runner-Up	Málaga Capital - Carmen Inongo (21)
2nd Runner-Up	Vélez Málaga - Paola Velasco (22)
Top 10 (alphabetical order by name)	Málaga Capital - Carmen Recio (23); Antequera - Cristina Fernández (24); Nerja - Cristina Gutiérrez (22); Málaga Capital - Julia Román (19); Fuengirola - Marina Martín (18); Málaga Capital - Paula Guerra (23); Nerja - Raquel Ramos (20)

=== Fast Tracks ===
Fast Track winners were: Raquel Ramos from Nerja voted as Multimedia Fast Track's winner by people in Facebook, and Paola Velasco from Vélez Málaga voted Top Model Fast Track's winner by a professional Fashion jury.

==== Multimedia ====
Final Result	Contestant
Winner	Nerja - Raquel Ramos
1st Runner-Up	Nerja - Cristina Gutiérrez
2nd Runner-Up	Vélez Málaga - Paola Velasco

==== Top Model ====
Final Result	Contestant
Winner	Vélez Málaga - Paola Velasco
