= Málaga Metropolitan Transport Consortium =

Logo

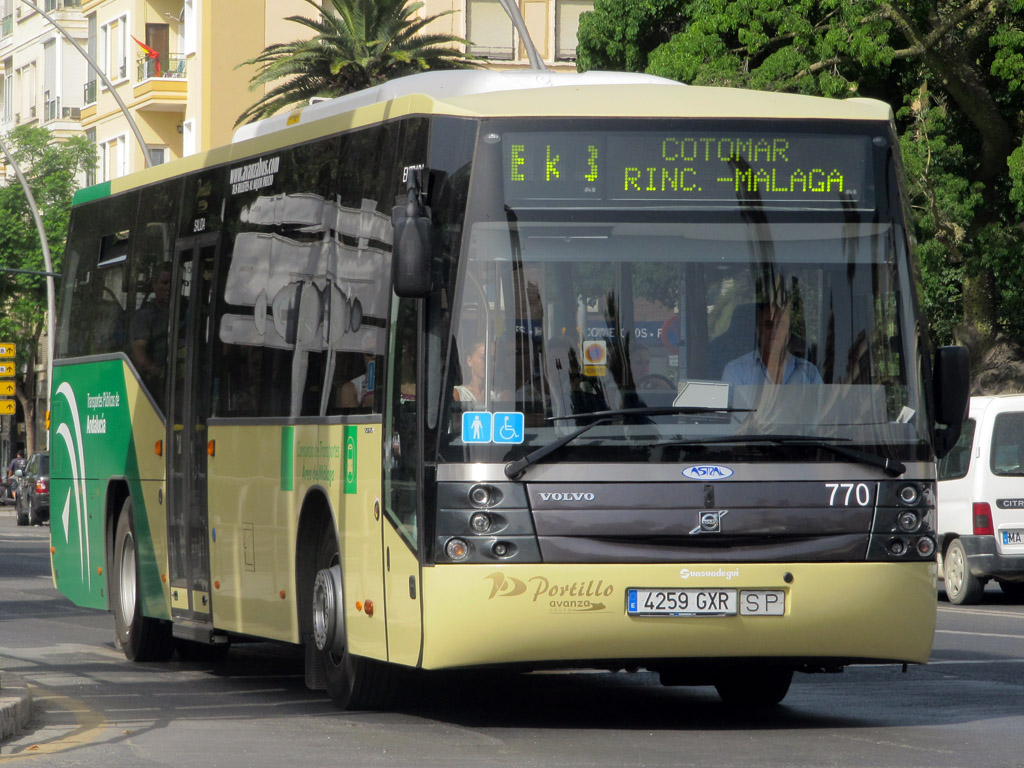
Bus in Málaga

The Málaga Area Metropolitan Transport Consortium is a Spanish public transport company founded on 18 September 2003 as an associative Public Law Body comprising the Andalusian Regional Government, Málaga Provincial Council and the local councils of Málaga, Mijas, Benalmádena, Rincón de la Victoria, Alhaurín de la Torre, Alhaurín el Grande, Cártama, Pizarra, Almogía, Colmenar, Casabermeja and Totalán.

The Consortium's membership currently comprises the Andalusian Regional Government (45%), Málaga Provincial Council (5%) and the aforementioned local councils in proportion to their respective populations (50%).
