= List of cities in Andalusia by population =

The following list sorts all cities in the Spanish autonomous community of Andalusia with a population of more than 25,000. As of January 1, 2025, 60 out of 785 municipalities fulfill this criterion and are listed here. This list refers only to the population of individual municipalities within their defined limits, which does not include other municipalities or suburban areas within urban agglomerations.

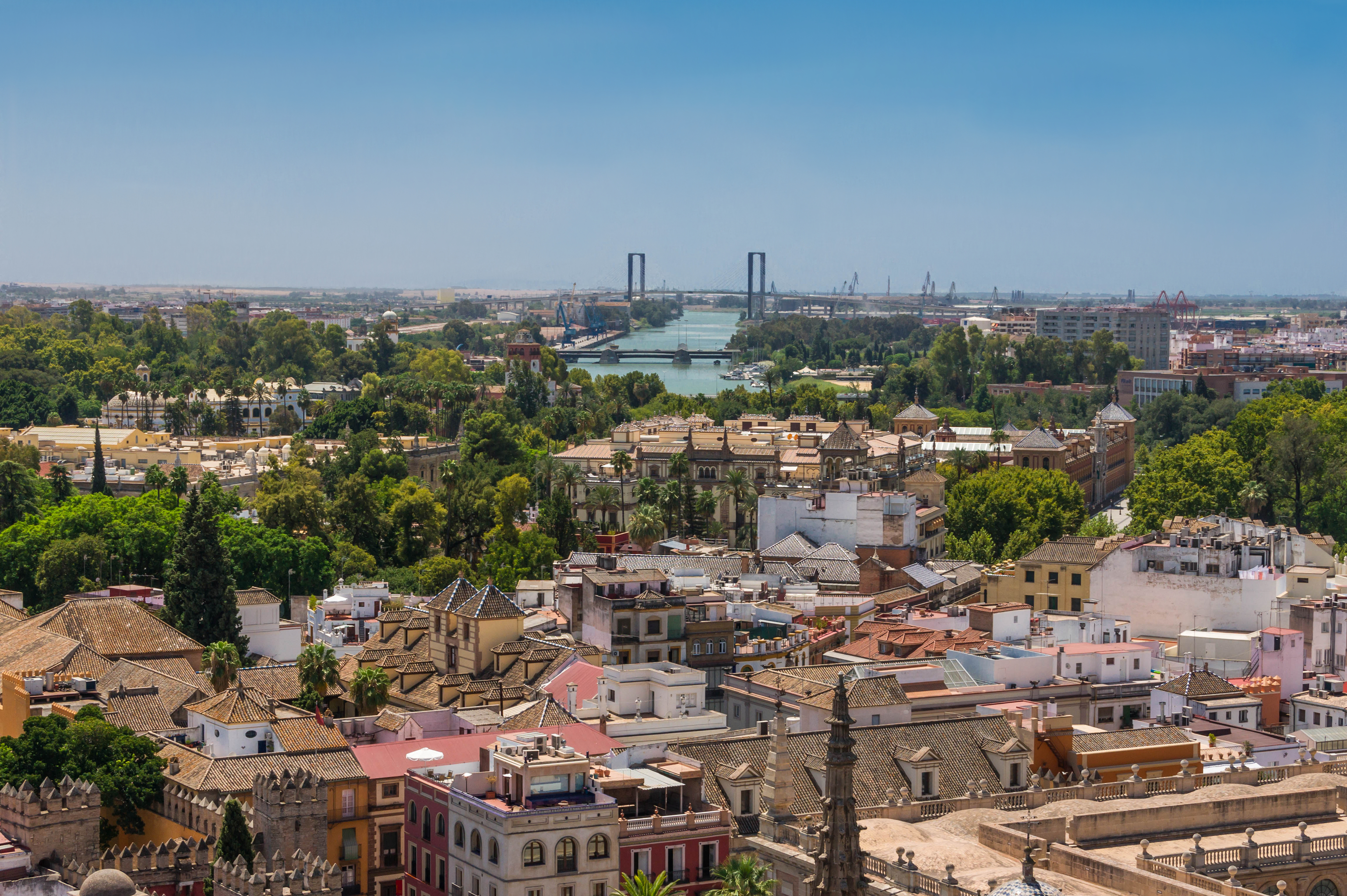
Seville

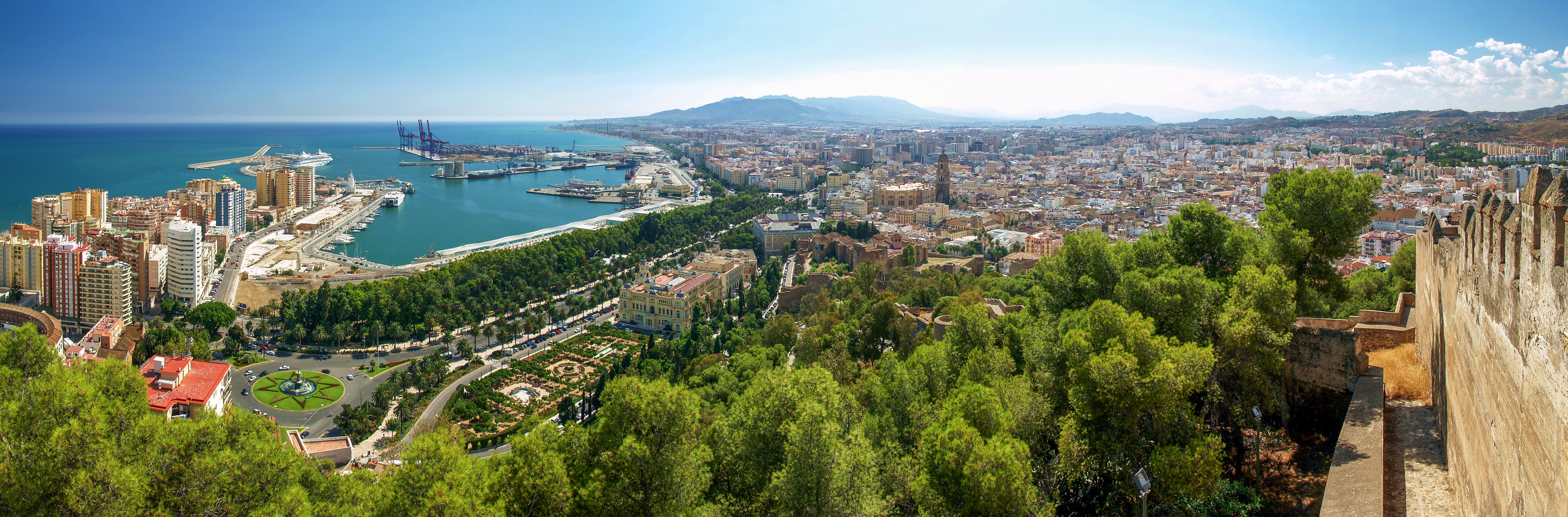
Málaga

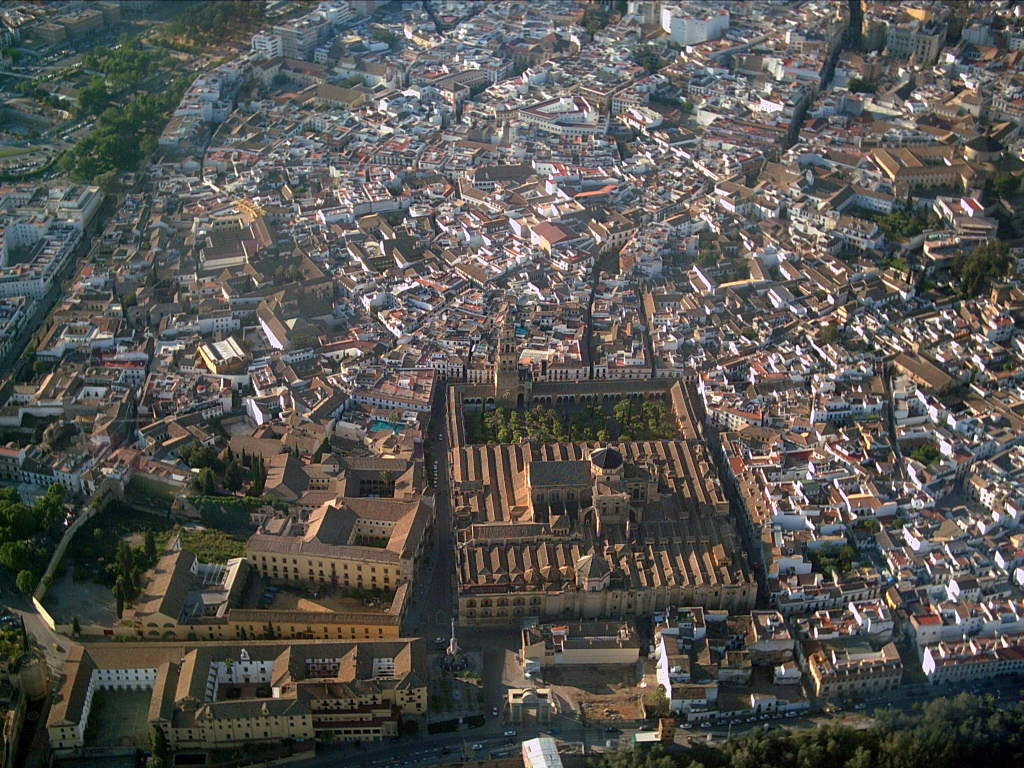
Córdoba

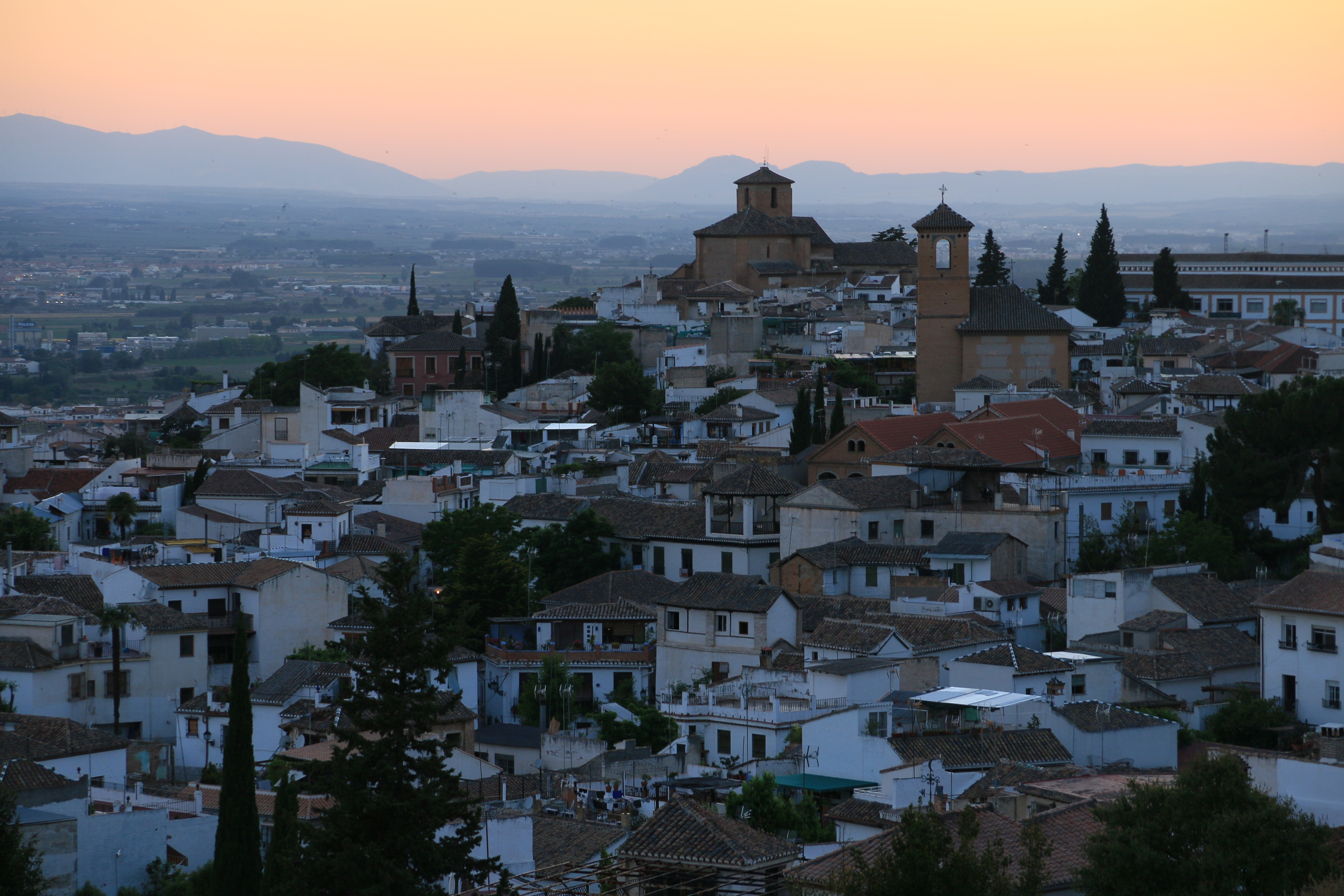
Granada

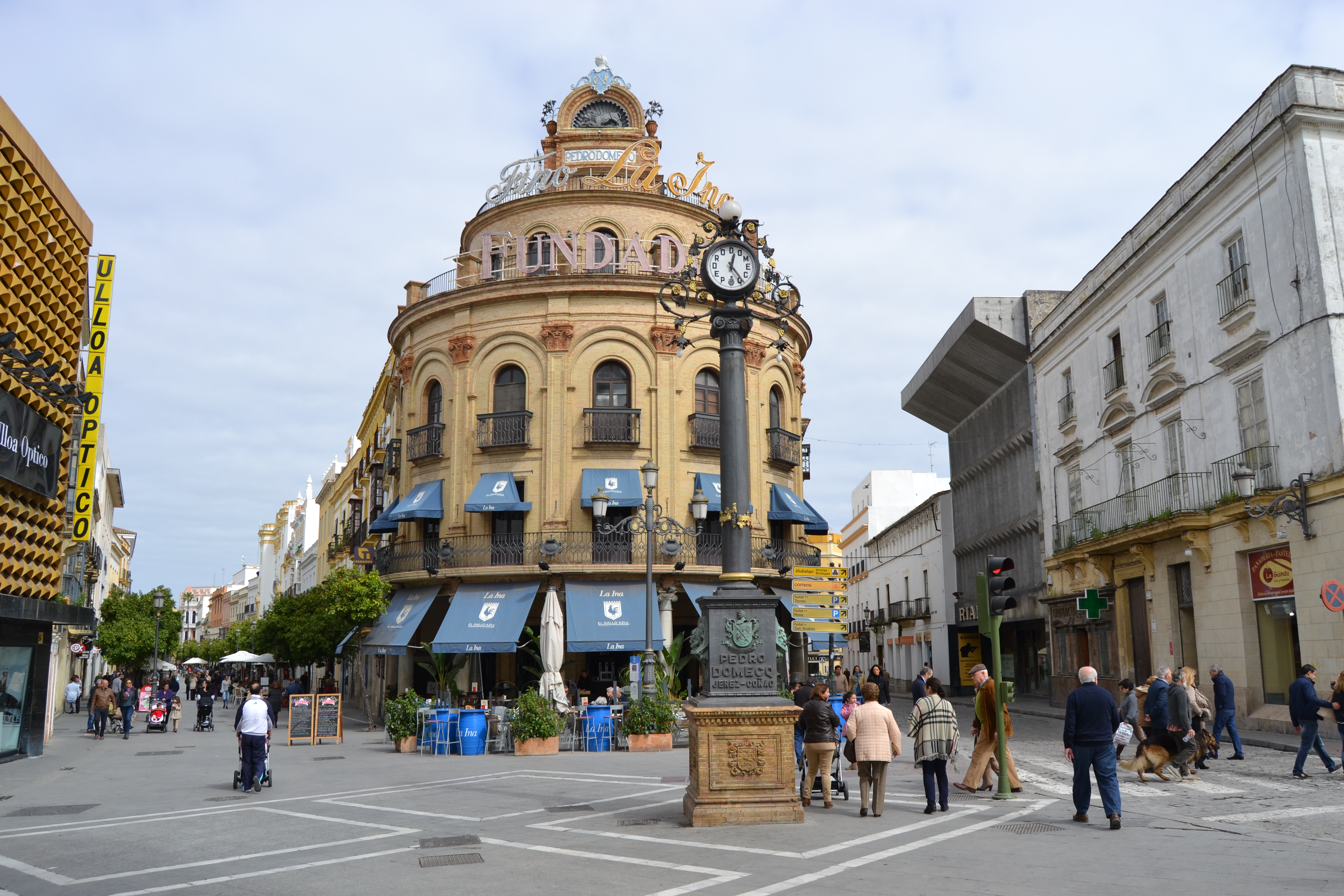
Jerez de la Frontera

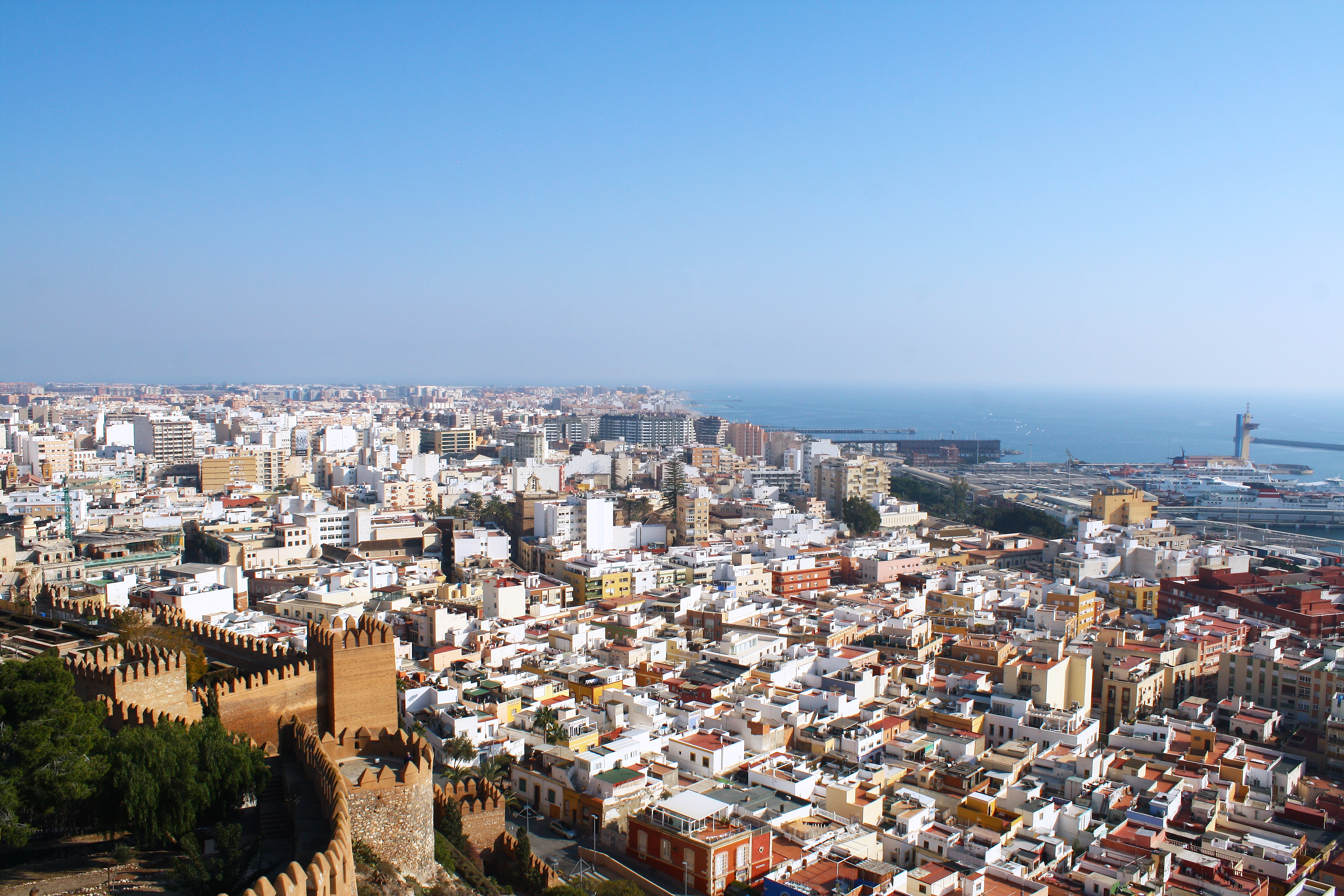
Almería

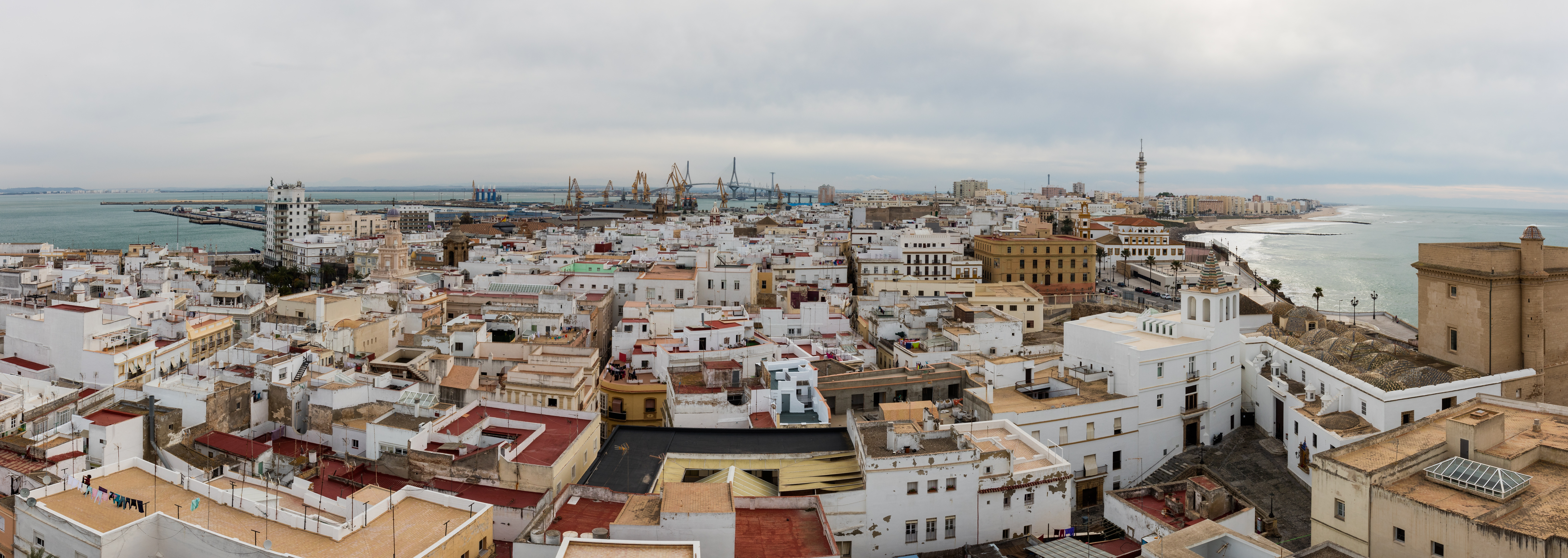
Cadiz

== List ==
The following table lists the 60 cities in Andalusia with a population of at least 25,000 on January 1, 2025, as estimated by the Instituto Nacional de Estadística. A city is displayed in bold if it is a state or federal capital or italic if it is a provincial capital.

2025 Rank	City	Province	2025 estimate	2021 Census	2011 Census	2001 Census	1991 Census	1981 Census
1	**Seville**	Seville	689,423	684,234	698,042	684,633	683,028	645,817
2	Málaga	Málaga	599,063	577,045	561,435	524,414	522,108	483,847
3	Córdoba	Córdoba	323,262	322,071	328,326	308,072	302,154	279,386
4	Granada	Granada	233,975	231,775	241,003	240,661	255,212	246,642
5	Jerez de la Frontera	Cádiz	213,634	212,801	211,784	183,273	179,247	171,283
6	Almería	Almería	205,468	200,753	189,680	166,328	155,120	140,745
7	Marbella	Málaga	159,786	147,958	135,124	100,036	80,599	60,172
8	Huelva	Huelva	143,215	142,538	147,808	142,284	142,547	127,822
9	Dos Hermanas	Seville	142,519	136,250	128,433	101,988	78,025	57,548
10	Algeciras	Cádiz	126,589	122,982	117,695	101,468	101,256	85,390
11	Jaén	Jaén	112,235	111,932	116,469	112,590	103,260	95,783
12	Roquetas de Mar	Almería	111,240	98,725	86,799	50,096	26,842	18,891
13	Cádiz	Cádiz	109,950	114,244	124,014	133,363	154,347	156,711
14	Mijas	Málaga	95,104	86,744	74,028	46,232	31,680	14,777
15	San Fernando	Cádiz	93,338	94,867	96,786	88,073	85,410	72,103
16	El Ejido	Almería	91,440	84,005	80,839	57,877	41,374	29,486
17	Chiclana de la Frontera	Cádiz	90,864	86,306	80,769	61,028	46,862	36,492
18	El Puerto de Santa María	Cádiz	89,983	89,060	89,012	76,236	65,517	55,748
19	Vélez-Málaga	Málaga	86,048	82,967	76,922	57,142	50,999	41,937
20	Fuengirola	Málaga	85,211	82,585	72,019	49,675	37,742	29,160
21	Estepona	Málaga	79,621	71,925	64,468	43,109	34,965	23,542
22	Benalmádena	Málaga	78,338	70,204	61,394	34,565	21,994	13,622
23	Alcalá de Guadaíra	Seville	77,474	75,546	73,317	57,426	52,257	45,577
24	Torremolinos	Málaga	71,329	68,056	66,270	44,772	27,543	18,385
25	Sanlúcar de Barrameda	Cádiz	70,012	69,507	67,232	60,254	56,006	48,390
26	La Línea de la Concepción	Cádiz	64,499	63,365	65,412	59,437	58,315	56,609
27	Motril	Granada	59,862	58,545	60,460	51,298	46,500	40,506
28	Linares	Jaén	55,633	56,525	60,799	57,578	59,249	55,122
29	Rincón de la Victoria	Málaga	52,454	49,790	41,040	25,302	12,601	7,803
30	Utrera	Seville	52,403	51,145	51,722	45,175	43,220	38,097
31	Mairena del Aljarafe	Seville	48,017	46,895	42,570	35,833	24,556	12,672
32	Alhaurín de la Torre	Málaga	45,066	41,868	37,020	23,369	12,874	7,622
33	Lucena	Córdoba	43,408	42,712	42,355	37,028	32,173	30,105
34	Puerto Real	Cádiz	42,527	41,771	41,299	35,783	29,638	23,890
35	Antequera	Málaga	41,849	41,348	41,741	40,289	38,765	35,765
36	La Rinconada	Seville	40,724	39,204	37,436	29,282	21,320	18,274
37	Écija	Seville	39,659	39,838	40,630	36,896	35,786	34,703
38	Los Palacios y Villafranca	Seville	38,761	38,678	37,720	33,045	29,522	24,349
39	Andújar	Jaén	35,610	36,212	38,813	36,455	36,661	35,475
40	Úbeda	Jaén	33,588	34,208	35,622	32,926	30,538	29,038
41	San Roque	Cádiz	34,310	32,178	29,956	23,436	21,224	19,072
42	Ronda	Málaga	33,671	33,624	36,473	34,468	33,900	30,762
43	Níjar	Almería	33,319	31,458	28,223	17,824	12,554	11,023
44	Arcos de la Frontera	Cádiz	31,267	30,902	31,368	27,849	26,946	25,168
45	Coria del Río	Seville	31,278	30,774	29,880	24,040	21,928	19,954
46	Puente Genil	Córdoba	29,963	29,767	30,304	28,004	26,387	26,215
47	Rota	Cádiz	29,289	29,326	29,169	25,053	22,691	20,559
48	Carmona	Seville	30,240	29,123	28,817	25,794	23,617	22,887
49	Lepe	Huelva	29,677	27,047	26,538	19,676	16,565	14,053
50	Cártama	Málaga	29,333	27,436	23,225	14,139	11,054	10,724
51	Vícar	Almería	29,342	27,398	23,482	16,784	11,885	7,640
52	Camas	Seville	29,089	27,490	26,433	24,966	25,501	25,574
53	Lebrija	Seville	27,788	27,616	27,241	24,121	22,250	19,561
54	Alhaurín el Grande	Málaga	27,552	26,053	23,164	17,764	17,257	14,279
55	Almuñécar	Granada	27,544	25,890	26,969	21,420	20,408	16,390
56	Morón de la Frontera	Seville	27,210	27,582	28,389	27,710	27,207	27,986
57	Coín	Málaga	26,574	23,509	21,692	17,388	14,855	20,958
58	Tomares	Seville	25,432	25,370	23,938	18,315	13,218	5,785
59	Adra	Almería	25,501	25,482	24,375	21,983	20,104	17,415
60	Armilla	Granada	25,300	24,430	22,593	15,404	10,921	10,278
