= Guadalhorce =

River in Spain

Coordinates: 36.666°N 4.455°W

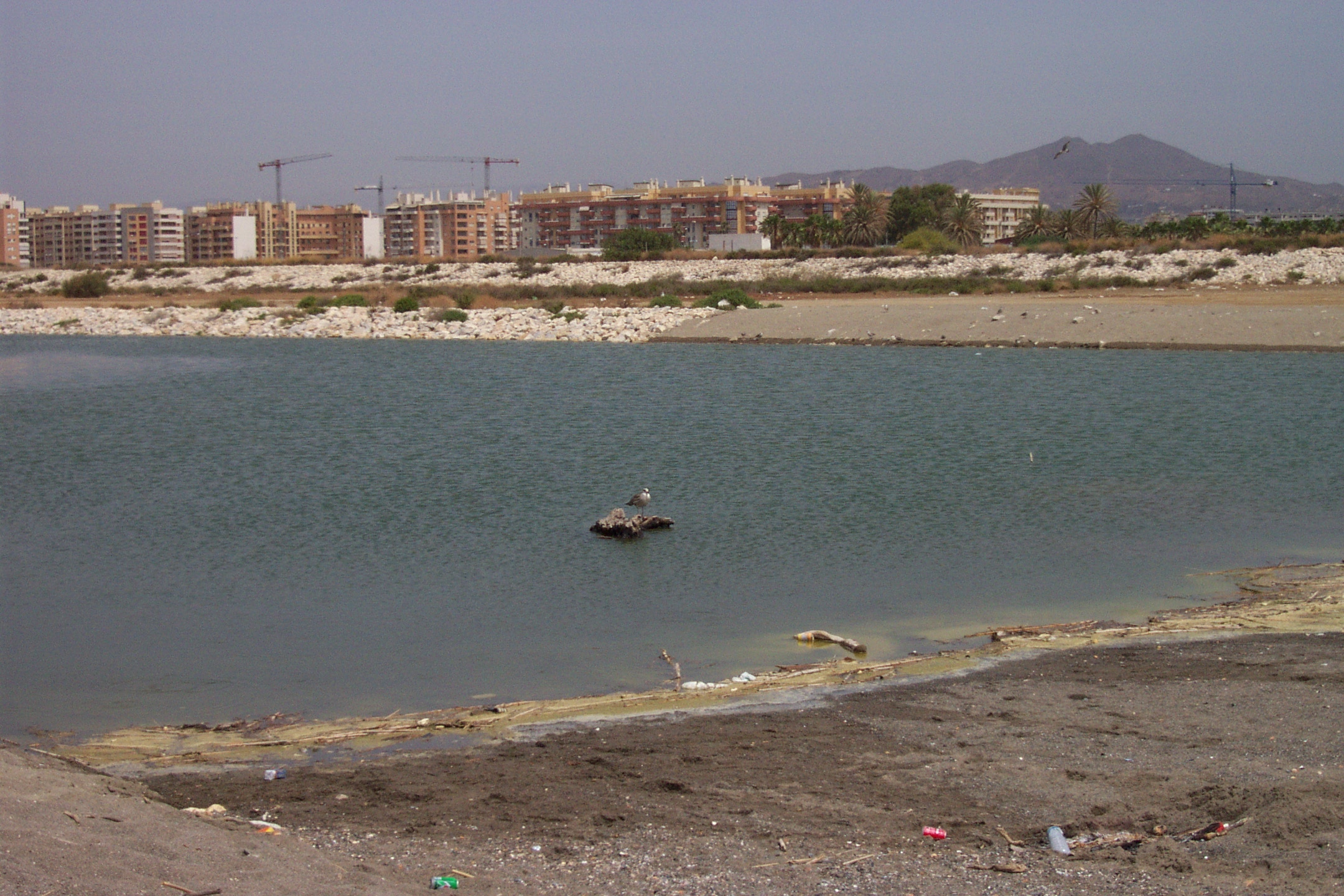
The Guadalhorce near Málaga.

The Guadalhorce (from Arabic وَادِي (wādī), "river" + Latin forfex, "scissors") is the principal river of the Province of Málaga in southern Spain.

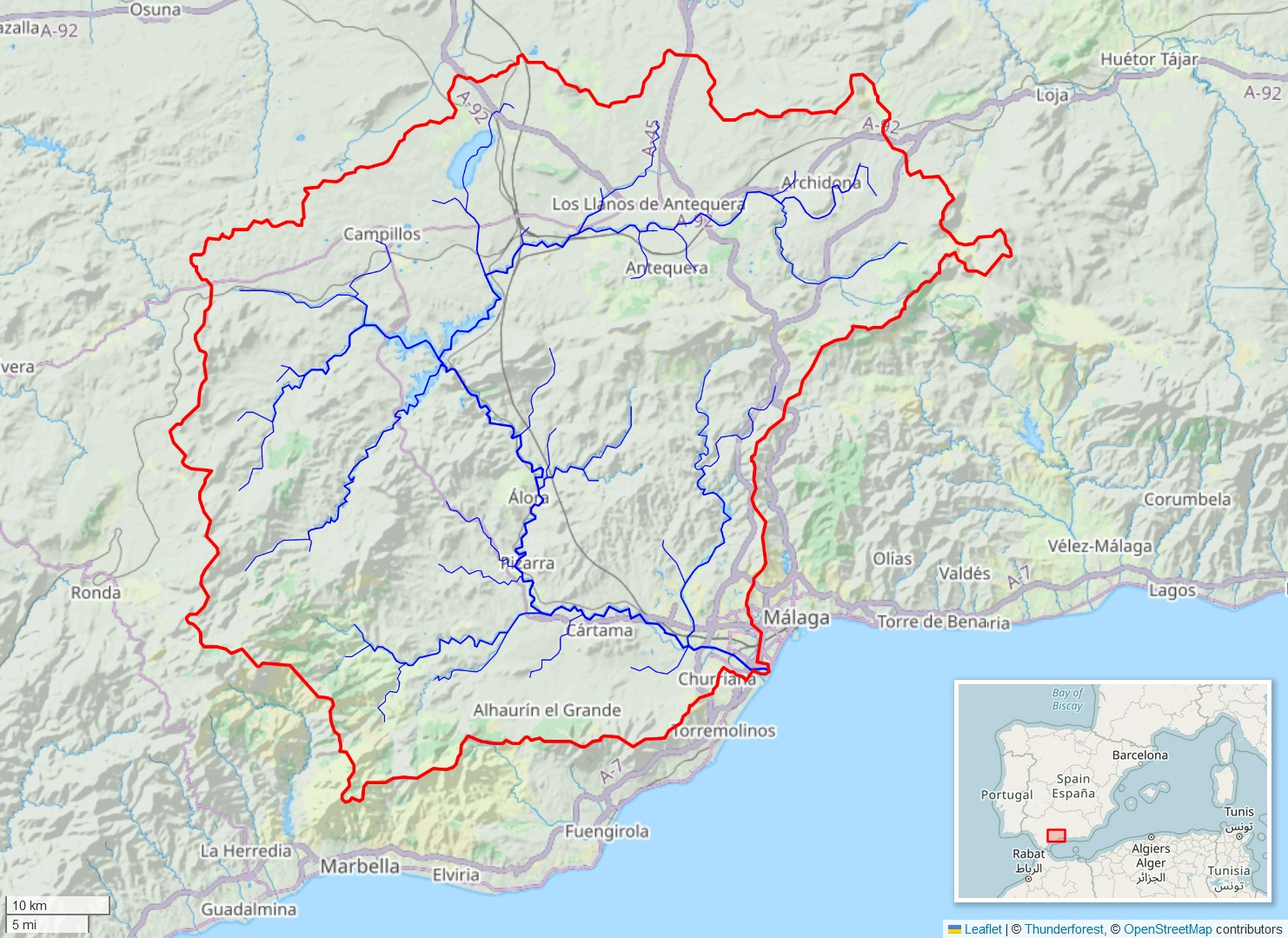
Guadalhorce River Watershed (Interactive map)

Its source is in the Sierra de Alhama in the Province of Granada, from which it drains the depression of Antequera, flowing for 166 kilometres (103 mi) through southern Andalusia into the Mediterranean west of the city of Málaga. It has the greatest volume of flow of any river in the Costa del Sol region after the Guadiaro. It forms the 7-kilometre (4 mi) long canyon of Desfiladero de los Gaitanes, a spectacular gorge with sheer walls towering up to 400 metres (1,300 ft) in places, before continuing through the Hoya de Málaga. Over its course, it passes through the towns of Villanueva del Trabuco, Villanueva del Rosario, Archidona, Antequera, Alhaurín el Grande, Alhaurín de la Torre, Almogía, Álora, Cártama, Coín, Pizarra and Valle de Abdalajís, forming the comarca of Valle del Guadalhorce; then bifurcates shortly before it reaches the sea. A portion of the river is diverted to provide water and power to the city of Málaga. Near its mouth the remains of a Phoenician settlement were found at Cerro del Villar.

== Geology ==
During the Miocene era, the river's valley was actually an arm of the sea that connected the waters of the Mediterranean with those of the Atlantic Ocean through the Bética depression (now the valley of the Guadalquivir). In the Pliocene, this connection was severed by the creation of the Sierra of Mijas and the Montes de Málaga, while also creating the geologically isolated Sierra of Cártama. Throughout the rest of the Pliocene, the river basin eventually took on its current form.

== Tributaries ==
- Pereila
- Río Grande
- Arroyo El Valle
- Nacimiento
- Río Turón
- Caballos
- Río Guadalteba
- Fahala
- Campanillas
- Arroyo Marín
- Arroyo del Quinto

== See also ==
- List of rivers of Spain
