= Llibre del Repartiment (Valencia) =

Book recording grants by King James I

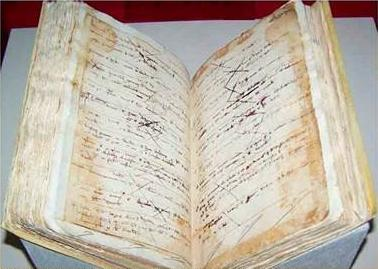
Llibre del Repartiment de València

The Llibre del Repartiment is a record book in which the King's scribes recorded promises of donations of properties at the conclusion of the Valencian conquest. The scribes later indicated the names of the persons who actually took possession. This is not the only distribution of lands during the time of the Reconquista; there are a few others, published and unpublished, the major ones are for Majorca, Seville, Murcia, Orihuela, Lorca, and other minor ones for Alora, Benalmádena, Comares, Cártama, Casabonarela, Coín, Mijas, Alhaurín, Almogía, Alozaina, Bezmilian among others.

== History ==
The capitulation of Valencia occurred on September 28, 1238. According to documents, the Christians, including King James I himself, entered the city on that day. Tradition, however, dates it on October 9, the day of San Dionís.

That same day the King distributed houses in the city and in Benimaclet, as was agreed in the siege, and the document was issued in the city.

The "llibre" meticulously recorded the houses or land grants made by King James I to the Aragonese, Catalan, Navarre, English, Hungarian, Italian and French, i.e. all those who participated in the crusade that resulted in the Conquest of Valencia.

Recorded in this book are the affiliation of the recipient of the house or farm, where they came from and the goods assigned.

The properties had been expropriated from the Muslims that lived there before. Some fled south with all their goods, to territories still controlled by Muslims, while others remained in the new Christian kingdom.

The record book is kept in the Archive of the Crown of Aragon (ACA).

== Special donations ==
- Paterna and Menezar: Artal de Luna
- Chiva: Berenguer de Entenza, the king's uncle.
- Sumacàrcer: Diego Crespí
- Moixent: Juan Caro
- Ortells: Pedro Artés
- Chella: Jaime Zapata de Calatayud
- Benafer: Lope de Esparza
- Genovés: Lope de Fenollet
- Mascarell: Alfonso Garcés
- Tous and Carlet: Jaime Montagut
- Benidoleig: Sancho de Pina
- Cirat and El Tormo: Bernardo Vilarig

== See also ==
- Llibre del Repartiment
