= Valle del Guadalhorce =

Coordinates: 36°45′07″N 4°39′29″W

- Comarca
- Location of Valle del Guadalhorce in Andalusia, Spain

- Location of Valle del Guadalhorce in the province of Málaga
- Country: Spain
- Autonomous community: Andalusia
- Province: Málaga
- Capital: Coín

Area
  - Total: 805.6 km^{2} (311.0 sq mi)

Population (2023) (Note: Estimate at 1 January 2023: National Statistics Institute (Spain))
  - Total: 153,794
  - Density: 190.9/km^{2} (494.4/sq mi)
- Time zone: UTC+1 (CET)
  - Summer (DST): UTC+2 (CEST)

The Valle del Guadalhorce is one of the nine comarcas in the province of Málaga, Andalusia, southern Spain. It includes 8 municipalities and is part of the natural region of the Guadalhorce river. This comarca was established in 2003 by the Government of Andalusia.

Coín is traditionally considered the most important town in the comarca.

== Municipalities ==
| Arms | Municipality | Area (km^{2}) | Population (2023) (Note: Estimate at 1 January 2023: National Statistics Institute (Spain)) | Density (/km^{2}) |
|---|---|---|---|---|
| | Alhaurín de la Torre | 82.7 | 43,674 | 528.1 |
| | Alhaurín el Grande | 73.1 | 26,879 | 367.7 |
| | Almogía | 162.9 | 3,967 | 24.4 |
| | Álora | 169.6 | 13,512 | 79.7 |
| | Cártama | 105.1 | 28,412 | 270.3 |
| | Coín | 127.4 | 25,023 | 196.4 |
| | Pizarra | 63.6 | 9,886 | 155.4 |
| | Valle de Abdalajís | 21.2 | 2,441 | 115.1 |
| | Totals | 805.6 | 153,794 | 190.9 |

== Gallery ==
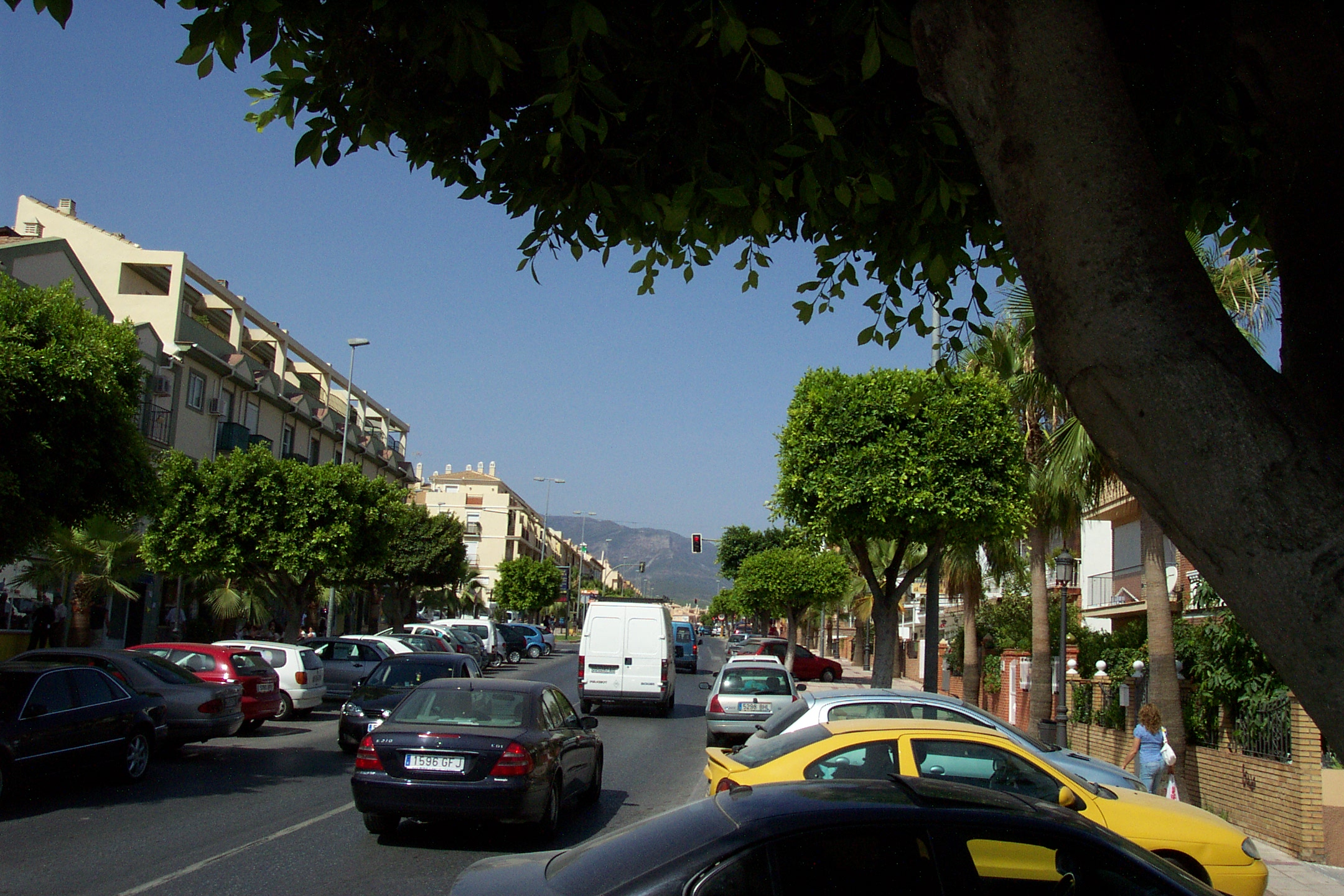
Alhaurín de la Torre

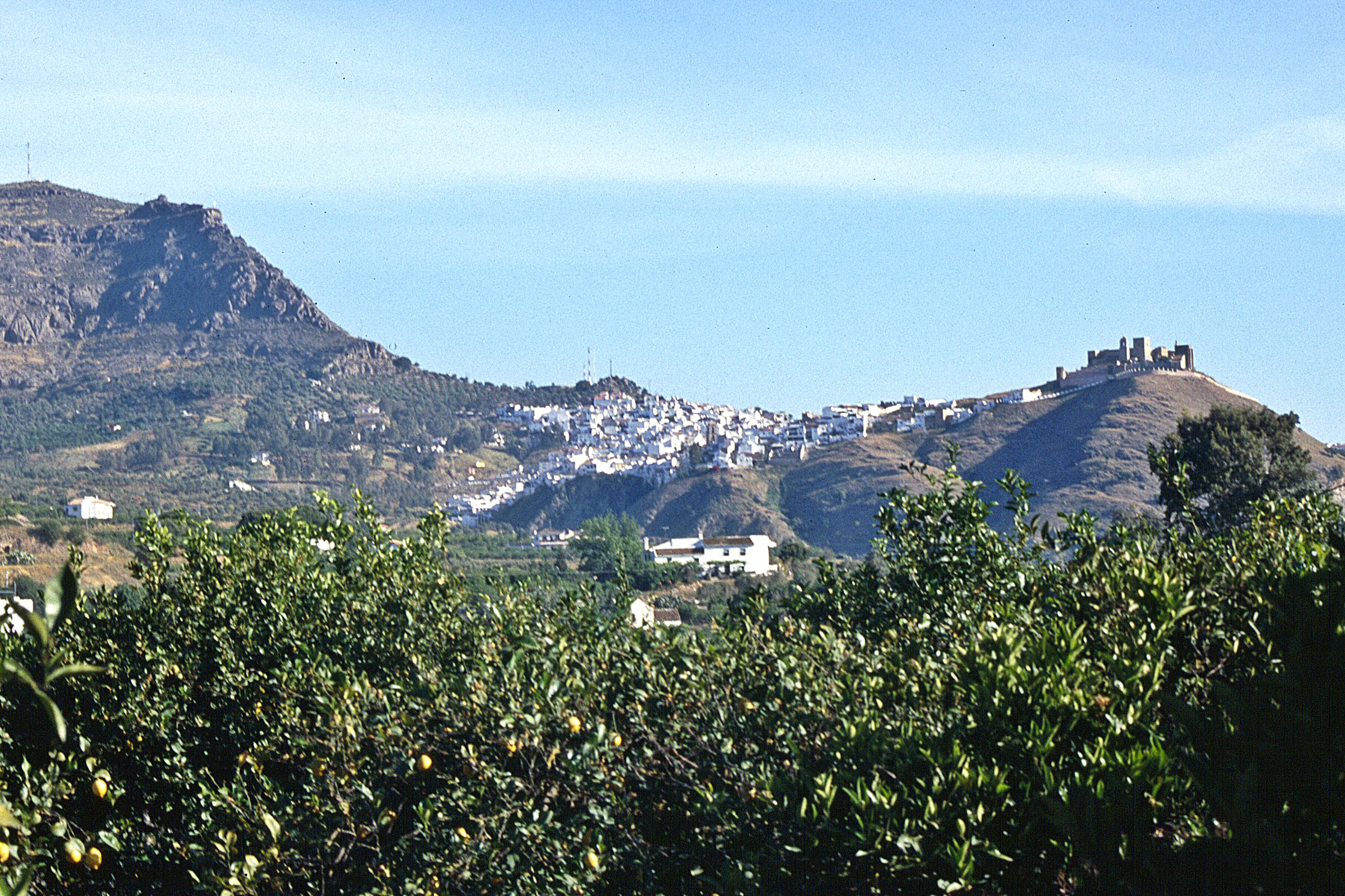
View of Álora

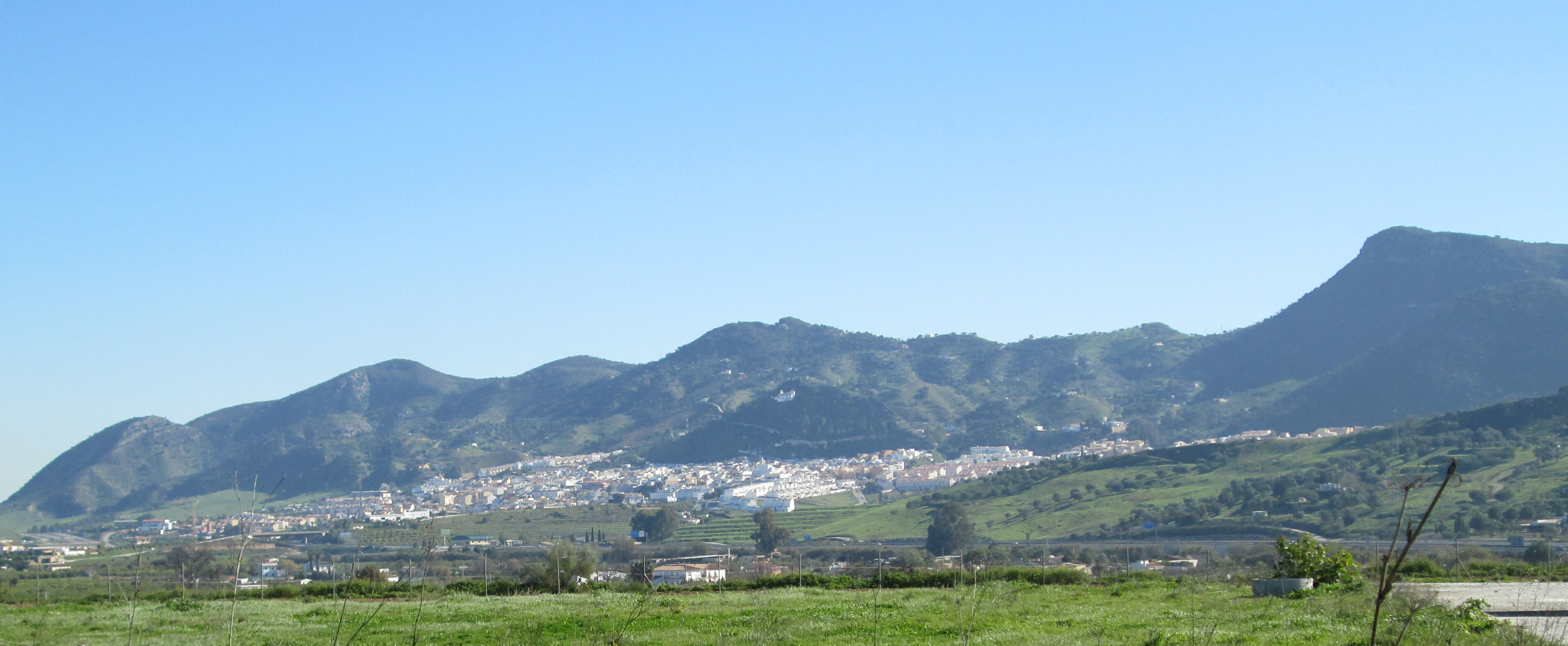
View of Cártama

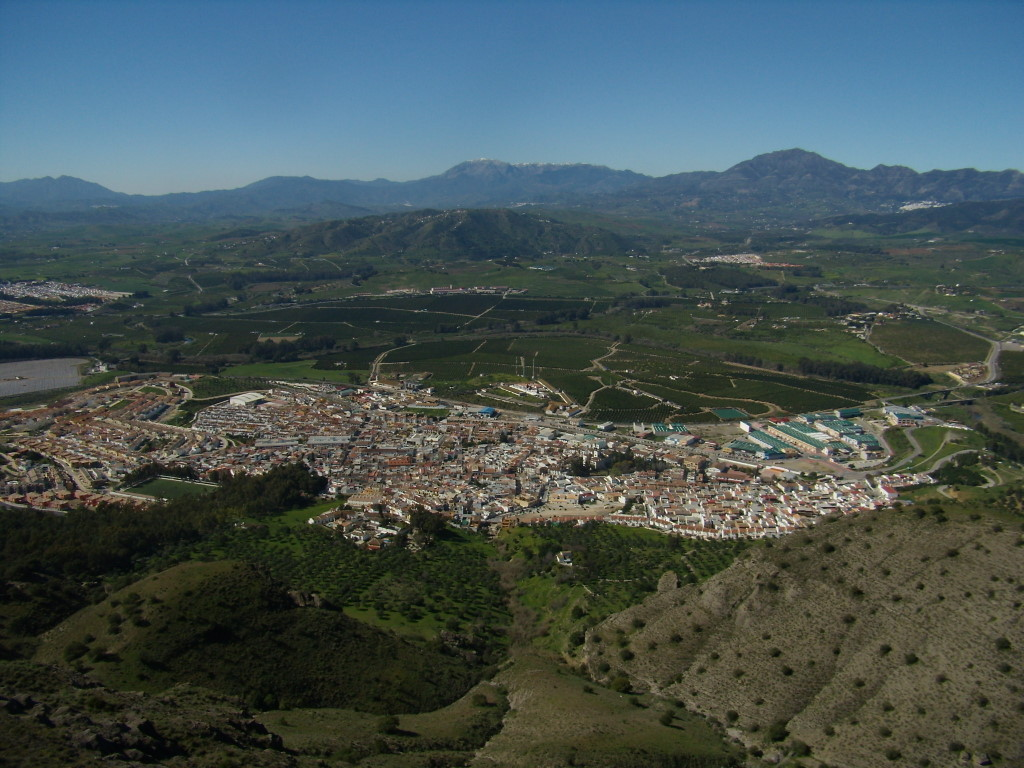
View of Pizarra
