= Alhaurín =

Alhaurín may refer to either of the following places in the province of Málaga, Andalusia, Spain:

- Alhaurín de la Torre
- Alhaurín el Grande
