= Llibre del Repartiment =

Llibre del Repartiment refers to one of several land distribution documents which partitioned land acquired by King James I during the Reconquista. The article may refer to:

- Llibre del Repartiment (Majorca)
- Llibre del Repartiment (Valencia)
