= Valle de Abdalajís =

- Municipality
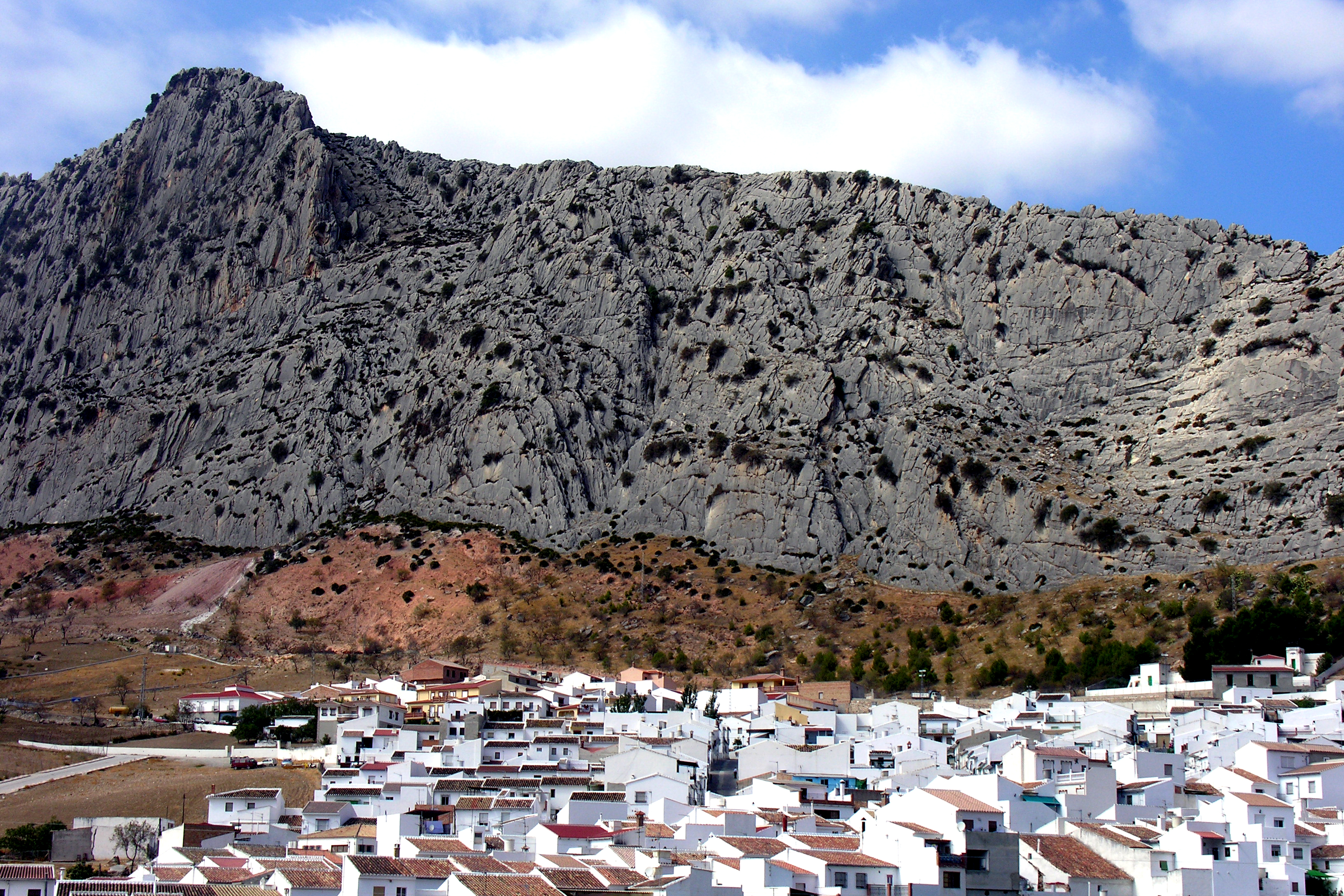

- Flag Coat of arms

- Location in Spain
- Coordinates: 36°56′N 4°41′W
- Sovereign state: Spain
- Autonomous community: Andalusia
- Province: Málaga

Government
  - Alcalde: Alonso García Carrasco (PSOE)

Area
  - Total: 21 km^{2} (8.1 sq mi)
- Elevation: 358 m (1,175 ft)

Population (2025-01-01)
  - Total: 2,439
  - Density: 120/km^{2} (300/sq mi)
- Demonym(s): Vallestero, Valluno
- Time zone: UTC+1 (CET)
  - Summer (DST): UTC+2 (CEST)
- Postal code: 29240
- Dialing code: 95
- Official language(s): Spanish
- Website: Official website

Valle de Abdalajís (Spanish pronunciation: [ˈba.ʎe ðe aβ.ða.laˈxis]) is a town and municipality in the province of Málaga, part of the autonomous community of Andalucía in southern Spain. It is located in the comarca of Antequera. The municipality is situated approximately 50 kilometres from the provincial capital of Málaga. It has a population of approximately 3,000 residents. The natives are called Vallesteros.

== Geography ==
The village is in the heart of the Penibetica mountain ranges and it's at the foot of the Abdalajís mountain range. The municipality is one of the smallest, in terms of area, in the province of Málaga. It has 21.4 km². It belongs to the Valle del Guadalhorce region.

Valle de Abdalajís is near to Antequera (21 km), Álora and the city of Málaga (50 km).

== Flora and fauna ==
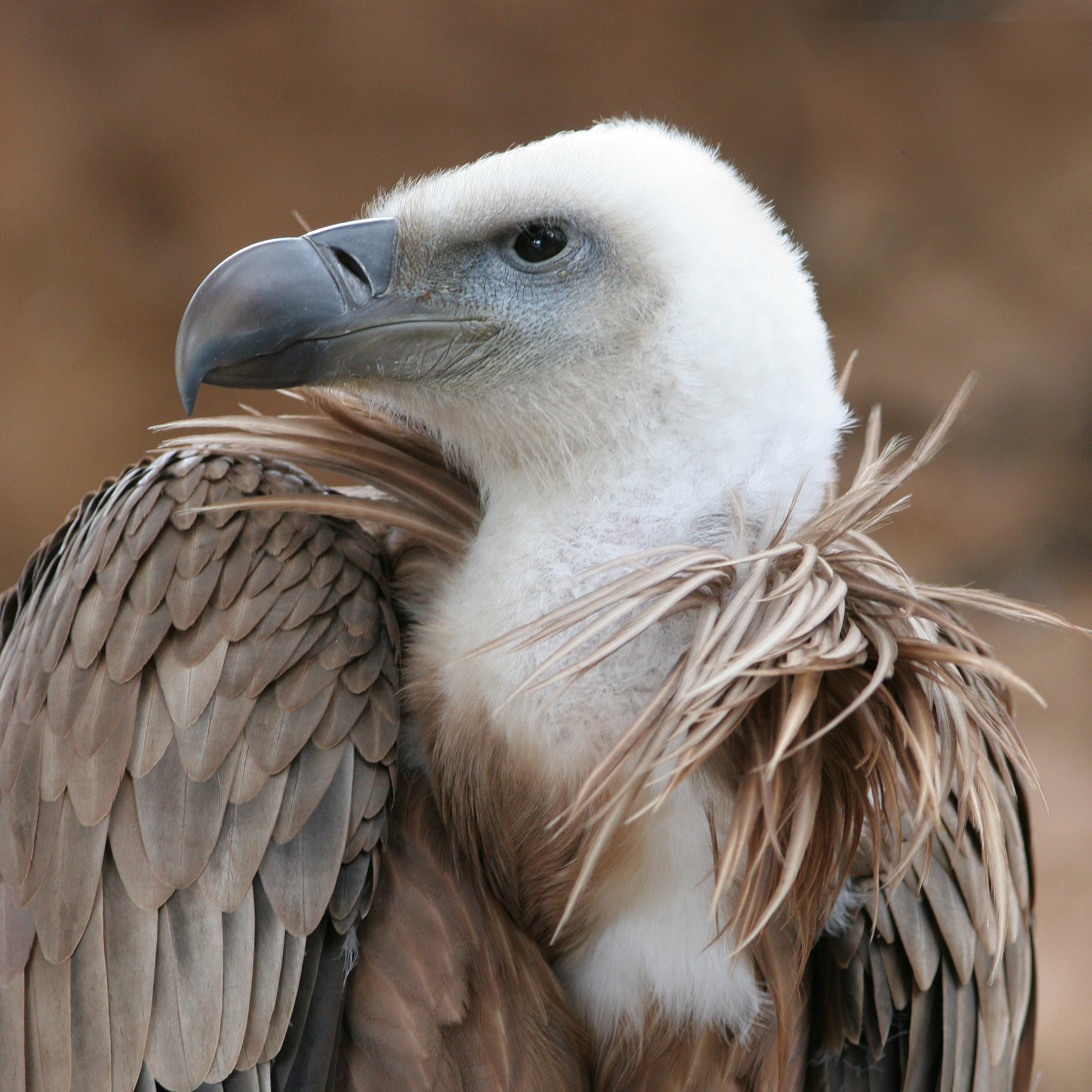
Griffon vulture.

The vegetation of this county is typical of a Mediterranean mountain town, abounding in low brush scrub and xerophytic vegetation due to dry and hot weather. Furthermore, the rockiness of the mountains and the fate of the lands to the cultivation of almond, grain and olive trees, the forests are absent.

In the mountains gives predominantly the typical vegetation of Mediterranean limestone areas characterized by low scrub (thyme, rosemary, lavender, gorse, prickly pears, agaves, palms, rock roses, hawthorn and broom). Along with a number of lower plants such as evergreens, vincas, St John's wort, poppies, peonies, lilies, and several types of Mediterranean orchids ... In the margins of the stream (The Arroyo de las piedras stream) are numerous species of vegetation of Mediterranean coastline and promenade, such as blackberries, rushes and sedges, oleander, water lily, watercress, matagallos, ivy, ... However, the riparian woody vegetation has completely disappeared due to cultivation of the fields adjacent to the stream.

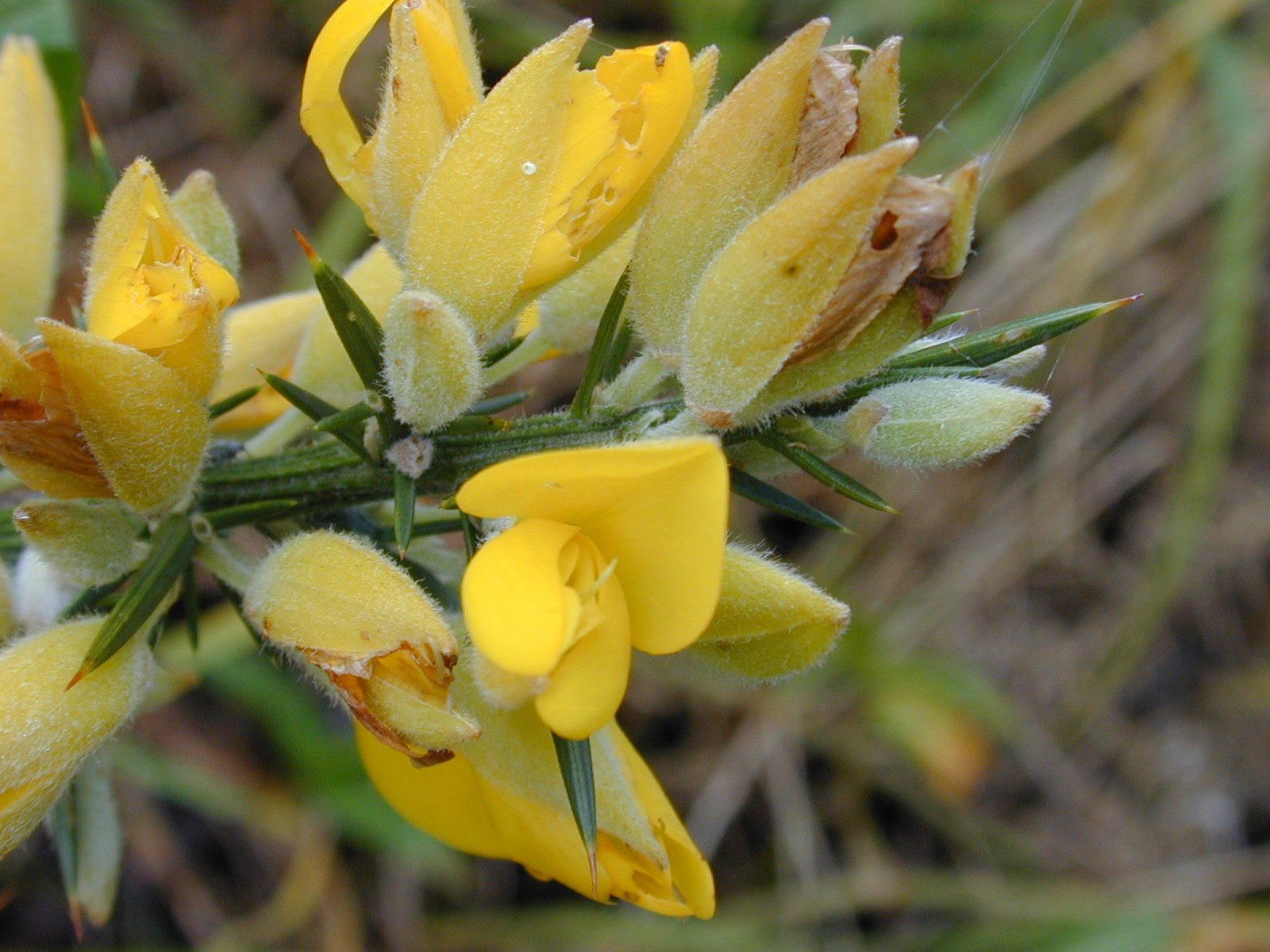
Gorse.

In spite of what popularly believed, currently there is no natural reserve (national park, nature reserve, natural park ...) in the municipality Abdalajís Valley, although there is the natural landscape of Los Gaitanes in the neighboring towns of Alora, Antequera and Ardales.

The Sierra de Abdalajís has, however, an interesting fauna amongst which are a considerable number of protected species such as owls, ibex, griffon vulture, golden eagle, the ladder snake, the horseshoe whip snake, wild cats, genets or ocellated lizard. In addition, a variety of smaller birds (swifts, sparrows, canaries, robins, swallows ...), insects, spiders and small mammals (rabbits, hares, moles).

In the surroundings of the stream avenue are common frogs and toads, water snakes, common turtle, terrapin, foxes, rabbits, hares, ferrets, badgers and other species common in the Mediterranean area.

== History ==
=== Prehistory and Iberian peoples ===
The situation of this small valley between the lands of Guadalhorce, communication channel to the sea and the city of Málaga and Antequera land between the Upper and Lower Andalusia, make it an important step along the history . A story that although was very ancient history, as evidenced by the numerous remains found in the area, has its first significant page in the Iberians times.

Since prehistoric times, the Abdalajís Valley has served as a must or a link between the area of the Guadalhorce and the Vega de Antequera which has provided an extraordinary archaeological wealth and evidenced by numerous archaeological sites and remains found in his term municipal (the caves called Cuevas del Gato and the cave called Cueva del ermitaño).

Already in the last century, writers such as Guillen Robles Berlanga and were amazed at it. This author in his book "Historia de Málaga y su provincia" said: "... have also been found in our country many stone axes found in our province, Almogía, Alora, Ronda, ... but be collected with greater abundance in the Abdalajís Valley, so I suspect that at this point would be found an important prehistoric station."

Indeed, countless quantities of finds of stone axes, flint tools and prehistoric pottery found in this locality. After primitive indigenous peoples, left important traces of their passage Iberians. It found the existence of an Iberian population, which later came into contact with the Phoenicians and Punics, as evidenced by the deposits of "El Nacimiento" and "Cerro del Castillo" (both have made Greek pottery fragments of the 5th century BC).

=== Roman Era ===
In the last quarter of the 1st millennium BCE, the Iberian Peninsula became part of the Roman Empire. The people quickly adopted Roman culture and the Latin language, and the transition to Roman rule was largely peaceful. As in many other places in Andalusia, the current city plan and the name originate from when Spain was part of the Roman Empire; the Latin name of the city was Neskania. The town appeared in the 70 (before Christ). Under the Romans, the city was an important commercial center and an important town, as the ruins show us.

=== Middle Ages and Modern Era ===
The Roman town is destroyed by people crossing the Pyrenees, including Vandals, Alans, Suebi and Visigoths, in the middle of the 4th century.

Juan Alonso Serrano (Bachiller) gave Valle de Abdalajis to Juan de Eslava in 1559. Then the village was Juan de Eslava's lordship. In 1811, the Cortes of Cádiz – which served as a parliamentary Regency after Ferdinand VII was deposed – abolished all the lord's domain and the lordships were returned to the people. After the French Domain ended and Ferdinand VII was reinstated, he returned the lordships to their lords. In 1833, Maria Christina of the Two Sicilies turned the lordships into villages governed by means of city councils.

== Art and folklore ==
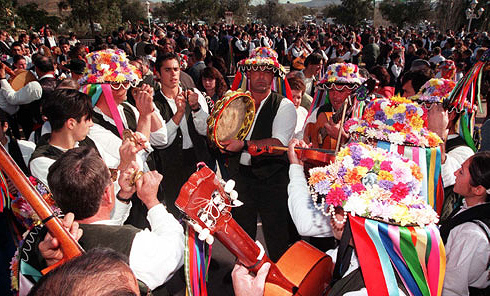
Panda de verdiales.

=== Verdiales ===
Verdiales are an important kind of flamenco music. It is a typical music and dance of the Málaga province. Verdiales are a kind of Fandango. A Verdiales band is formed by a violin, a guitar, a lot of cymbals and tambourines. The village has two verdiales bands.

There are 3 different Verdiales styles: Comares, Los Montes and Almogía style. The village sings Almogía style.

== Extreme sports ==
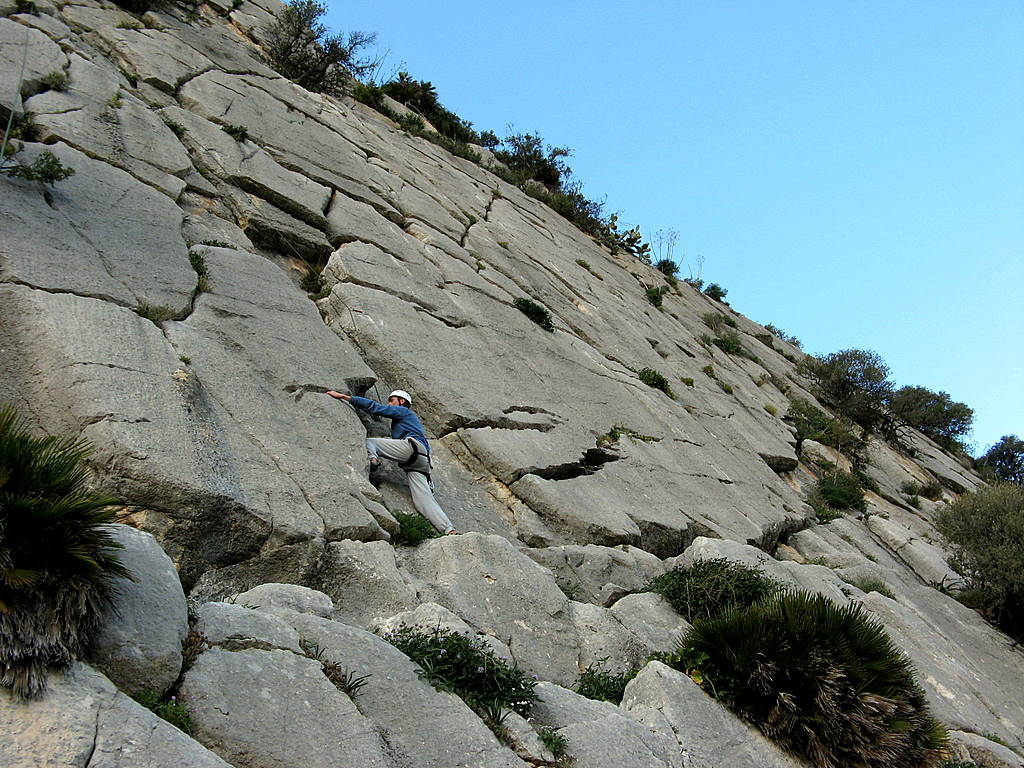
Climbing in Valle de Abdalajís.

In the village mountains one can practice climbing and other extreme sports except paragliding, which was claimed to be too dangerous considering the surroundings of the area.

== Economy ==
Historically, the region's economy was based on the production and processing of agricultural products (olives, grain, and milk). Today, rural tourism is an important industry, but the olives production is the main economic source.

== Sister cities ==
- Baler, Philippines

== See also ==
- List of municipalities in Málaga
