= Pizarra =

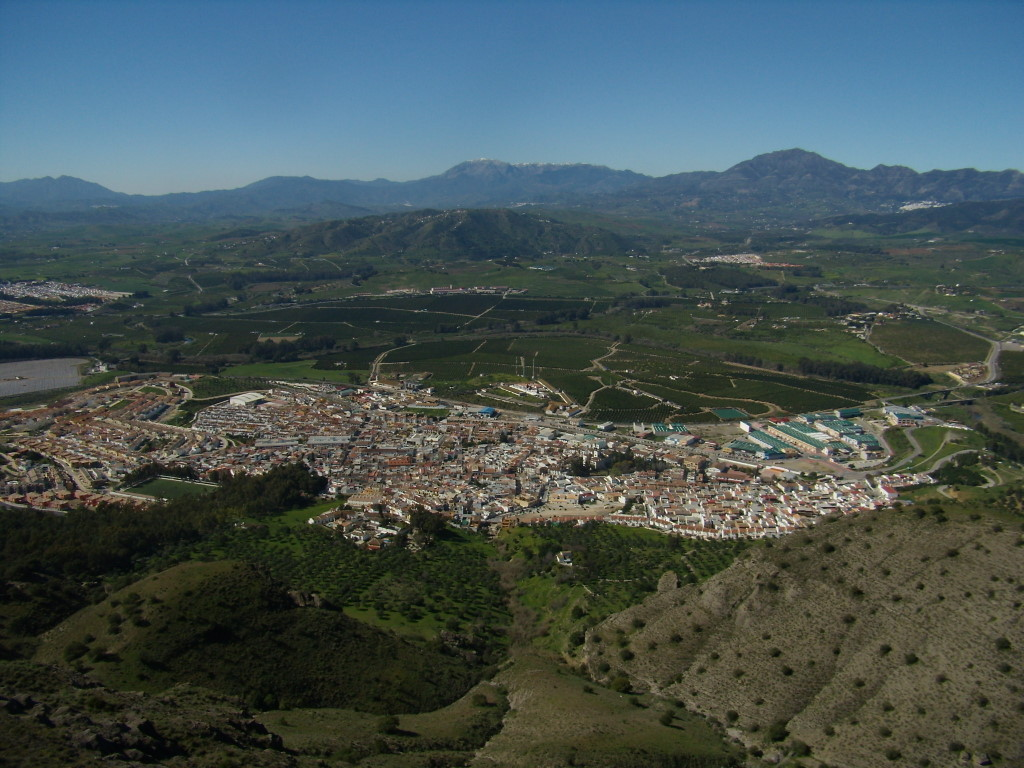

- Flag Coat of arms

- Location in Spain.
- Coordinates: 36°46′N 4°42′W
- Sovereign state: Spain
- Autonomous community: Andalusia
- Province: Málaga
- Comarca: Valle del Guadalhorce

Government
  - Mayor: Francisco Vargas Ramos

Area
  - Total: 63.61 km^{2} (24.56 sq mi)

Population (2025-01-01)
  - Total: 10,334
  - Density: 162.5/km^{2} (420.8/sq mi)
- Demonym: Pizarreños
- Time zone: UTC+1 (CET)
  - Summer (DST): UTC+2 (CEST)
- Website: Official website

Pizarra is a town and municipality in the province of Málaga, part of the autonomous community of Andalusia in southern Spain. The municipality is situated approximately 30 kilometres from Málaga. It is located in the center of the province and belongs to the comarca of Valle del Guadalhorce.

The town is served by the Málaga Metropolitan Transport Consortium Metropolitan bus lines.

The municipality of Pizarra is located in a strategic area in the Guadalhorce Valley region, between Álora and Cártama. It is 10 km from Álora and around 13 km from Cártama. Pizarra is crossed by the Guadalhorce River along 8.5 kilometres (which has a width of 11.5) and 8 km, from east to west and from north to south, respectively. Pizarra is also surrounded by Almogía, Cártama, Coín, Álora, and Casarabonela .

It is located 80 meters above sea level. Its highest point is in the Sierra de Gibralmora, 447 meters above sea level, which offers a landscape of sandstone rocks by some of the shapes that this rock presents at the top on the side facing Pizarra.

Pizarra is very well connected to its capital, Málaga, which is 30 km away and can be reached from the town by road, bus or rail.

Pizarra is a municipality dedicated to irrigation, as it has a municipal surface area of just over 64 km² dedicated to this. The local products of the land are typical of the Guadalhorce Valley, as are the neighbouring towns. In dry land, the most important crops are olive and almond trees, and to a lesser extent, but no less important, cereals and legumes. As for irrigated land, lemon and orange trees predominate.

In the western half of the area, the new irrigation systems of the Guadalhorce have transformed the small hills and undulating terrain into terraces where citrus fruits, subtropical crops and other fruit trees are grown, completing and enhancing the landscape of traditional orchards.

Centuries-old carob trees, olive trees, fig trees, almond trees, walnut trees and fruit trees beautify the landscape all year round. Drinking water comes from the high mountains, which are rich in streams.

Land ownership, on the other hand, is more concentrated here, which produces a high number of temporary workers, seasonal workers who depend on the harvest season, and others to a lesser extent who are self-employed. On the other hand, there is little incidence of agricultural cooperatives. In livestock farming, the most prominent are chicken and pig farms. Hence, there are feed and flour factories, as well as some textile cooperatives and metal carpentry workshops. The construction sector is more dynamic than the industrial sector.

The tertiary sector employs a quarter of the population. This is where the future of these towns lies, through the symbiosis of nature, work and services. In recent years, rural tourism has become more important.

== History ==
=== Origin of the Village ===
At the time of the reconquest of Álora (22 June 1484) this town did not exist, but at the end of the 15th century, the place of Pizarra appeared, built on the lands of Diego Romero. In the last third of the 16th century, it appeared as a town, having an Ordinary Mayor for its government and a Brotherhood Mayor for the custody of its fields. In 159,2 these positions were held by the neighbours Alonso Boza and Bartolomé de Vargas .

On this date, the mayor of Malaga, Licenciado Osorio, stripped the two aforementioned mayors of Pizarra of their offices. Not satisfied with the deprivation of their positions, they demanded justice, and the Royal Court and Chancery of Granada,, on December 16, 1594, condemned the Mayor of Malaga and other councilors to a fine and the restitution of the rods that were taken from them. By Royal Decree issued in Granada on January 26, 1595, the Notary of Malaga Manuel Sánchez Boa restored both Pizarra mayors to their respective offices. From that date, Pizarra began to appoint its own mayors, although subject to the jurisdiction of the city of Malaga, except in ecclesiastical matters, since it was annexed to Álora in the parish service.

== See also ==
- List of municipalities in Málaga
