= Llibre del Repartiment (Majorca) =

The Llibre del Repartiment is a record book in which the king's scribes recorded the pledges of properties at the completion of a conquest. The document includes only properties that were ceded to the monarch after the conquest of the island of Majorca in 1229. It meticulously recorded the houses or land donations made by James I to the Aragonese and Catalan nobles and ultimately to all who participated in the crusade for the conquest of Majorca. Of course, the properties had been expropriated from the Muslims who had previously inhabited the island of Majorca.

This book is kept in the "l'Arxiu del Regne de Mallorca" in the city of Palma, but actually consists of two volumes: one bilingual in Latin and Arabic, and another in Catalan.

The groups that had greater involvement in the company were Barcelona and Marseille, the first with a total of 877 horses and the second with 636, followed by the Knights Templar which had 525.

== See also ==
- Llibre del Repartiment
