= Cártama =

Town in Málaga, Spain

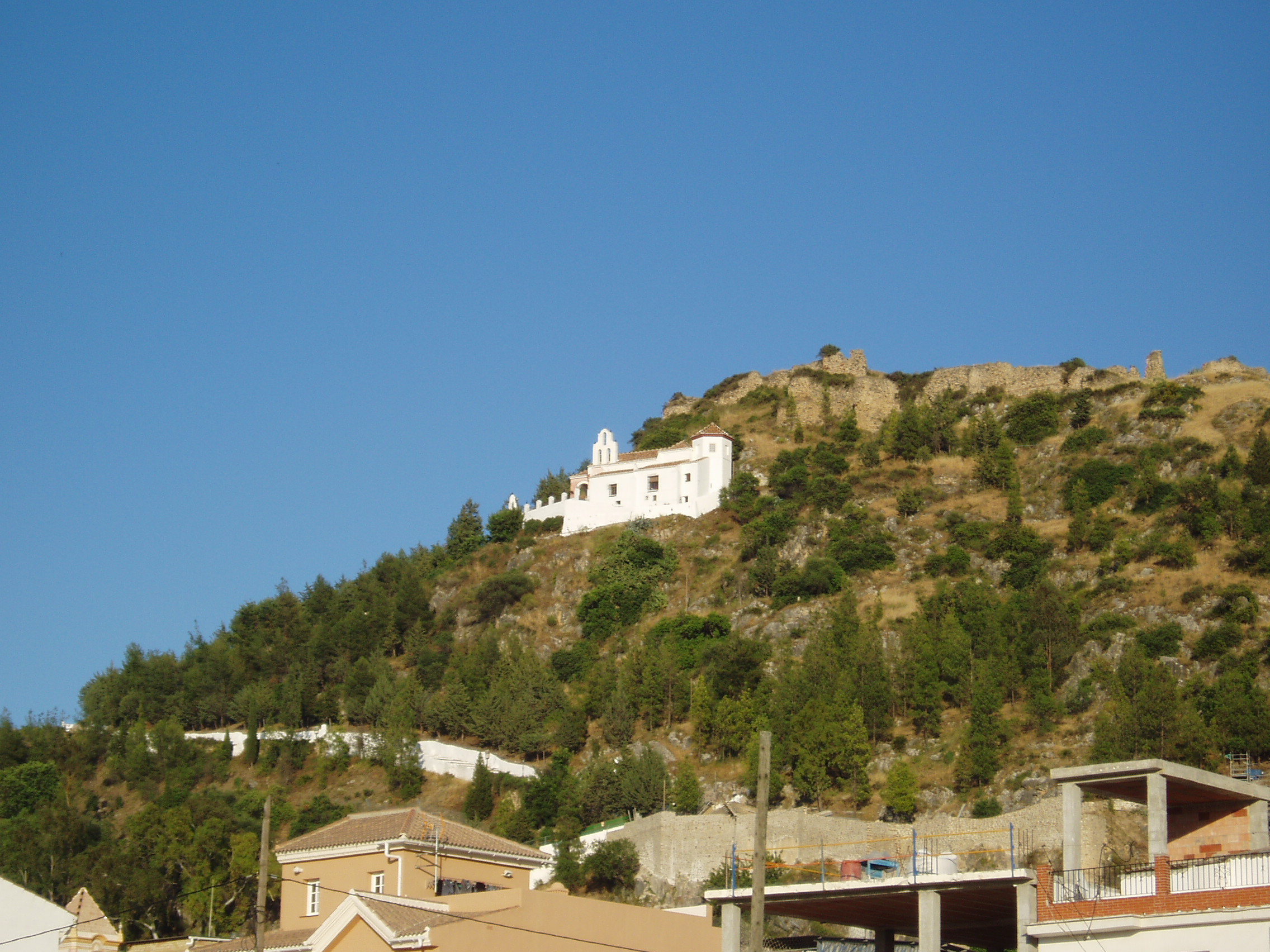
- The Hermitage of Cártama

- Flag Coat of arms

- Location of Cártama
- Coordinates: 36°42′41″N 4°37′50″W
- Sovereign state: Spain
- Autonomous community: Andalusia
- Province: Málaga
- Comarca: Valle del Guadalhorce

Government
  - Mayor: Jorge Gallardo Gandulla (PSOE)

Area
  - Total: 105.07 km^{2} (40.57 sq mi)
- Elevation (AMSL): 96 m (315 ft)

Population (2025-01-01)
  - Total: 29,333
  - Density: 279.18/km^{2} (723.06/sq mi)
- Demonym: Cartameños
- Time zone: UTC+1 (CET)
  - Summer (DST): UTC+2 (CEST)
- Postal code: 29570-29580
- Area code: (+34) 952
- Vehicle registration: MA
- Website: www.cartama.es

Cártama is a town and municipality in the province of Málaga, part of the autonomous community of Andalusia, southern Spain. The municipality is situated approximately 17 km (11 mi) from Málaga. It is one of the most extensive towns in the province, covering c. 105 km^{2} (41 sq mi). Cártama has a population of approximately 15,000 residents.

== Geography ==
Situated in the heart of the Guadalhorce valley, at the foot of two small sierras, and surrounded by thousands of orange and lemon trees, its territory forms part of the Hoya de Málaga, 17 km (11 mi) from the provincial capital. It stretches across both banks of the river.

From its main vantage point, the Hill of the Virgin, can be seen the different communities which make up the town: Cártama Pueblo, the ancient town with a 3000-year history and streets laid out in Moorish style; Estación de Cartama, which has its origin in the 1865 railway station; El Sexmo, Doñana, Aljaima and the Sierra de Gibralgalia, with views of the whole valley as far as Coín, Álora, Casarabonela and Málaga itself.

The original town, Cártama Pueblo, stretches across the steep side of the Hill of the Virgin (240 m over the sea level). Its buildings and roads follow the contours of the hill, and reflect the varied topography of the area.

One of the town's most well-known features is the iron bridge (the "green bridge" or puente verde) over the Guadalhorce river, and which provided access between Estación and the pueblo before its replacement by a more modern road bridge. This area has been restored as a recreational area, and an extensive riverside leisure area is now planned.

== History ==
The strategic position that Cártama holds, on a natural route from the coast to the interior, made it an obvious place to settle. The area has been successively occupied by Iberians, Tartessians, Phoenicians, Romans, Visigoths, Byzantines and Arabs until it was finally conquered by the Christians in 1485. It was one of the last Moorish strongholds to fall to the army of King Ferdinand the Catholic.

The Phoenicians, who were already established in Málaga, made incursions to the interior via the river. They gave the town its first recorded name, Cartha, which means "concealed city" or "hidden city". Later, the Romans renamed it Cartima, founding the town in 195 BC, and providing it with strong defences. The Roman occupation lasted for six centuries, and during this time it was one of the principal towns of the province. Based on the sheer volume of archaeological sites – mosaics, sculptures, burial grounds and road remains have been found – the area must have been heavily populated. The baths of Cartima, with their fabled curative powers, were famous during this period.

== Main sights ==
The Hermitage of Our Lady of the Remedies (La Ermita de Nuestra Señora de los Remedios) is situated on the Hill of the Virgin and which has been designated a building of historical and cultural interest. It was built on the site of a previous Hermitage from the 15th century. The building has an approach which winds up the hill above the pueblo, and offers views of the surrounding area.

A remnant of the Roman period is the 2nd-century AD column, called the Humilladero Cross, after for the forged iron cross attached to its top. This well-preserved column is an important reminder of the "Cartima Municipium", and for this reason is incorporated in the town's heraldic crest. It was saved and placed on its current site in 1752 to mark the excavations carried out then by the Marquis de Valdeflores, as an inscription in its base testifies.

The castle dates from the 10th century, when the city was ruled by the Moors. It sits astride a ridge which dominates the surrounding area, and offers wonderful panoramic views. Between the 13th and 15th centuries its strategic situation meant that it became one of Málaga's more important defences, guarding against access from the Guadalhorce valley, which was one of the easier routes to mount an attack on the capital. Its construction is typically military, with a double defensive enclosure; the first had ten towers, while the second, nearer the town, had eight towers and another walled tower. It was well equipped to resist siege, as it had two wells, dug in the time of the Caliphs. The castle's capture by the Catholic Monarchs in 1485 is recorded in the bas-reliefs of the Coro in the Cathedral of Toledo, which testifies to Cártama's importance at the time. Once the Christians recaptured Málaga, however, the castle fell into progressive decay.

The Church of Saint Peter the Apostle, built on the site of the old mosque after the Christian capture of the city. It is still standing and has been extensively refurbished.

== Famous people ==
In the street Calle Viento is the house of the poet José González Marín, who was born in Cártama in 1889 and died there in 1956.

On the same street is the house of Jose Alarcon Lujan, who was born in the town in 1821 and died there in 1902. The house is an elegant mansion which still preserves the architectural beauty of the period.

== Traditions ==
Cártama is famous for its festivals and ferias. The carnivals occur during February, but the main festival of the year takes place in April to honour the town's patron saint, La Virgen de los Remedios. The statue of the Virgin is carried down the mountain from its chapel in the Ermíta to its temporary home, the Church of Saint Peter the Apostle. On 23 April the Virgin is paraded through the town, and pilgrims come from many miles around, and even from abroad, to witness the procession and make offerings. The fiesta is followed by a cattle fair. This fiesta has recently been designated a "Fiesta of National Touristic Interest" by the Tourist Board of Andalusia.

In May, Estación holds its feria to celebrate the Saint's Day of its patron, San Isidro. The most notable feature is an extensive parade, which accompanies the image of the saint to the banks of the River Guadalhorce, where a celebration is held throughout the day. Prizes are awarded for the best decorated street.

On the first Sunday in May the town holds the Verdiales festival, which is a traditional country song and dance festival with competing groups from Álora, Pizarra, Almogía and Cártama taking part. This event, held at the Ermita de las Cruces, has been declared an "Event of National Tourist Interest".

There are many other annual events, including the return of La Virgen to the Ermita in early June, the festival of San Juan in late June, and the September Cattle Fair. The El Sexmo fair, held in the second week of September, lasts for four days. The Día de los Canastitos is held on Saint Ann's day on the banks of the Río Grande and features people arriving with baskets of fruit and bread, and the Verdiales which feature the old wheel dances.

== See also ==
- List of municipalities in Málaga
