= Álora =

- Municipality
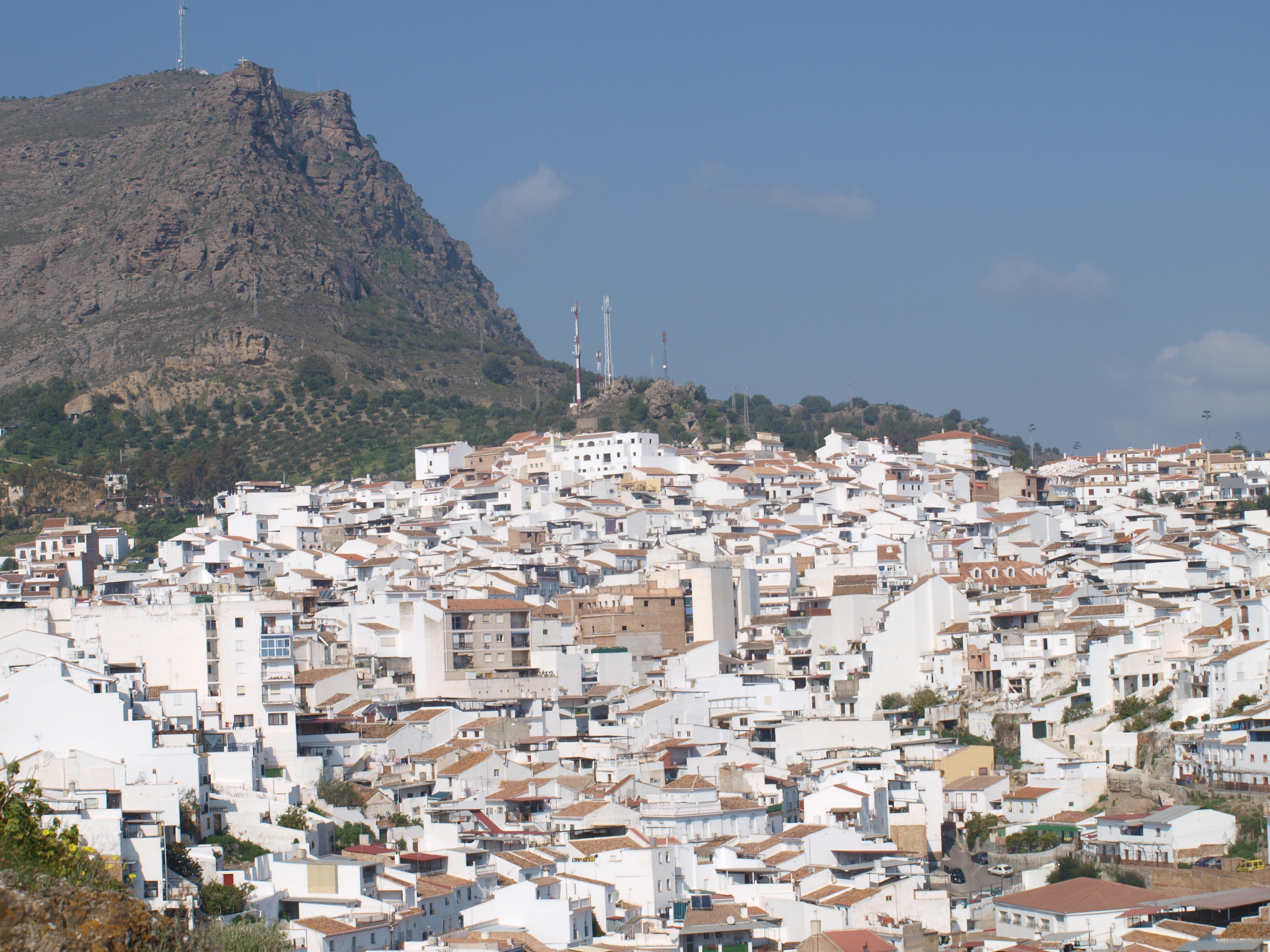
- Álora seen from the castle, with mountain Hacho behind.

- Flag Coat of arms

- Municipal location in the Province of Málaga

- Location in Spain
- Coordinates: 36°49′N 4°42′W
- Country: Spain
- Autonomous community: Andalusia
- Province: Málaga
- Comarca: Valle del Guadalhorce

Government
  - Mayor: José Sánchez Moreno (PSOE)

Area
  - Total: 169.58 km^{2} (65.48 sq mi)
- Elevation: 222 m (728 ft)

Population (2025-01-01)
  - Total: 13,650
  - Density: 80.49/km^{2} (208.5/sq mi)
- Demonyms: Perotes, Aloreños
- Postal code: 29500, 29510
- Website: Official website

Álora is a town and municipality in southern Spain in the province of Málaga, in the autonomous community of Andalusia. Located c. 40 km from Málaga, on the right bank of the river Guadalhorce and on the Córdoba-Málaga railway, within the comarca of Valle del Guadalhorce. It is a typical pueblo blanco, a whitewashed village nestled between three rocky spurs topped by the ruins of the castle.

The municipality covers an area of 169.58 km^{2} that covers a wide territory in which the large landforms of Málaga are located. The hills are occupied by cereal, olive and oak trees and orchards of fruit and vegetables that cover the valley floor. Its population is 13,436 inhabitants, according to the INE census of 2008.

Álora's history dates back to prehistoric times in the Hoyo del Conde, a little over a kilometer from the city. The ecological environment (hunting, water, natural protection) favored this presence until the Turdetanis of Tartessos and the Phoenicians discovered the commercial potential of the area. The latter built the foundations of the castle, which the Romans would take advantage of by fortifying it.

The inhabitants are known as Perotes.

== Adjective ==
There are several versions of the origin of the term "perote," while it is best known for being the first alderman Don Pero, in time immediately after the reconquest by the Catholic Monarchs, hence the name of the area "The Perocia".

== Geography ==
Álora is the crown in the Valle del Guadalhorce between three hills on the right bank of the Guadalhorce river and on the railway route between Málaga and Seville, Córdoba or Granada. The towers of its castle, lookouts for the movement of people and goods to the inner lands, in the realms of Bobastro, stand over the town which is sheltered discretely between two small headlands and Mount Hacho (559 m).

It is spread over a vast territory in which are located the major landforms of Málaga. To the north of Arco Calizo Central is the natural setting of El Chorro, the Sierra de Huma (1,191 m) and the Desfiladero de los Gaitanes, where the famous Caminito del Rey is found (so called because it was inaugurated by King Alfonso XIII).

To the west, the Sierra de Aguas (949 m) extends to these lands and the mountain complex of Serranía de Ronda, a landscape of pine forests extending from the Guadalhorce river to the road that joins Álora with Carratraca.

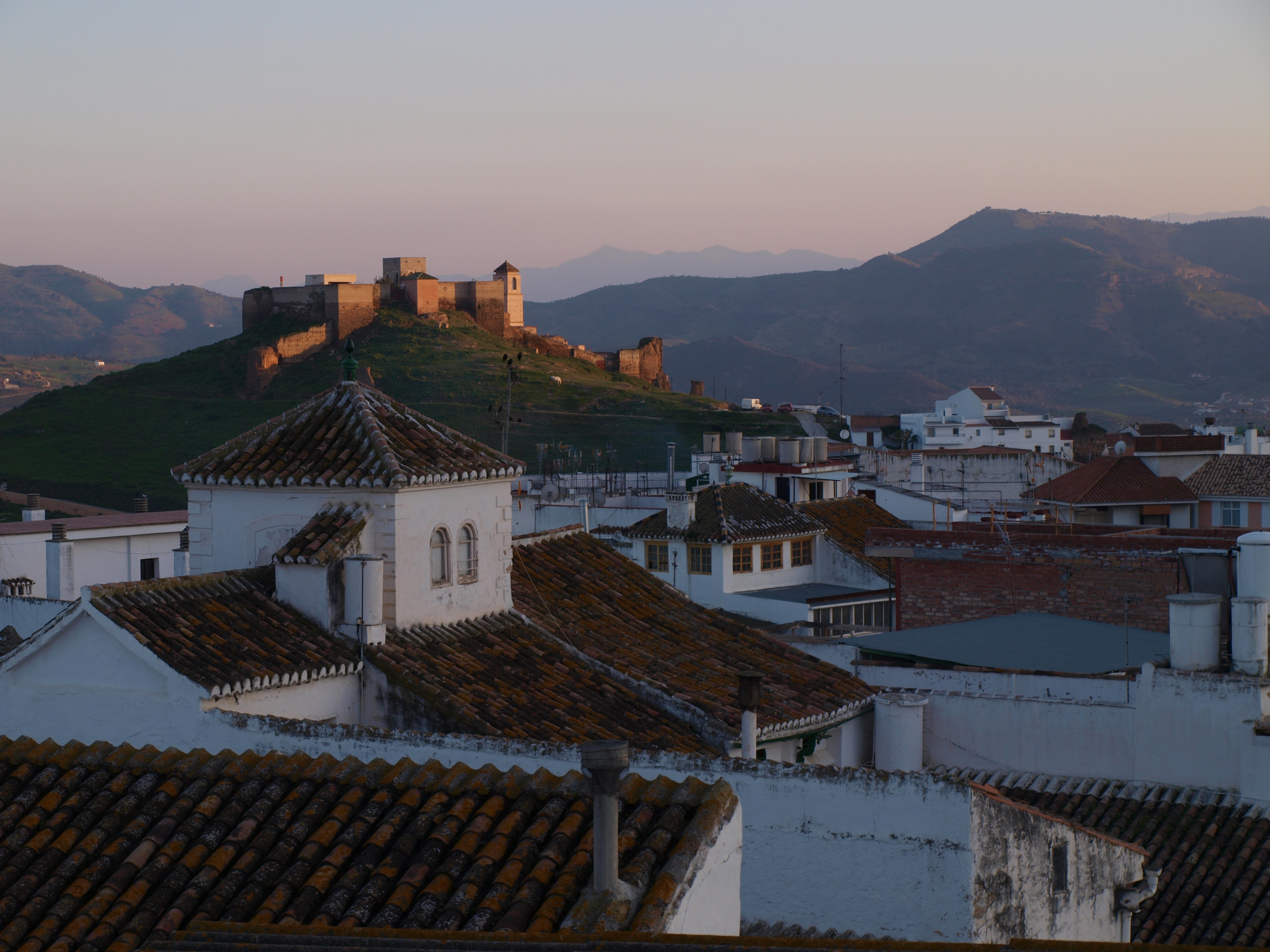
View of Álora

== History ==
The area was first inhabited in prehistoric times, and was exploited for its commercial position by Tartessos and by the Phoenicians, who most likely built the castle. The Romans, after their conquest of Spain, restored the fortress and had here a municipium known as Iluritanum, as attested by an inscription dating to 79 BC.

The fortress was further enlarged by the Visigoths and, above all, by the Moors, who conquered it early during their conquest of Spain. Álora became a stronghold of the rebellious Umar ibn Hafsun, semi-independent lord of Bobastro in the time of the emirate of Córdoba. The Christians of northern and central Spain attempted numerous times to conquer the town, but were successful only in 1484.

Álora enjoyed a period of prosperity during the 16th and 17th centuries, and in 1628 it became autonomous from the commune of Málaga. In the 20th century much of the population emigrated, especially to Argentina and, starting from the 1960s, Germany, Australia and Switzerland.

== Main sights ==
Álora's castle was built by the Phoenicians and then expanded under Roman rule. In the 5th century the castle was virtually destroyed by the Visigoths, but was rebuilt under the Moors; remnants of this era still remain, namely the decorative steel door and the traditional Arab mirador.

Other sights include:

- church and convent of Nuestra Señora de Flores (16th century)
- Iglesia de la Veracruz (16th century)
- church of Nuestra Señora de la Encarnación, located on the site of the castle's mosque. It houses a crucifix by José Navas Parejo.
- chapel of St. Brigida (16th century)
- chapel of Las Torres (15th century), in late Gothic style

== Local transport ==
Álora is connected to Málaga by the Cercanías (commuter or suburban) railway Line 2, which runs up the valley of the Guadalhorce river from Málaga Centro-Alameda via the mainline station at Málaga María Zambrano to Álora, taking about forty minutes for the forty kilometre journey with six other intermediate stations. For visitors arriving from the airport, Cercanías Line 1 runs frequently to Málaga Victoria Kent or María Zambrano, where connections may be made to Line 2.

Buses run by Málaga Metropolitan Transport Consortium (Consorcio de Transporte Metropolitano del Área de Málaga) are the main form of transport around the town of Álora and the villages of the metropolitan area.

== See also ==
- List of municipalities in Málaga
