= Alhaurín de la Torre =

- Municipality
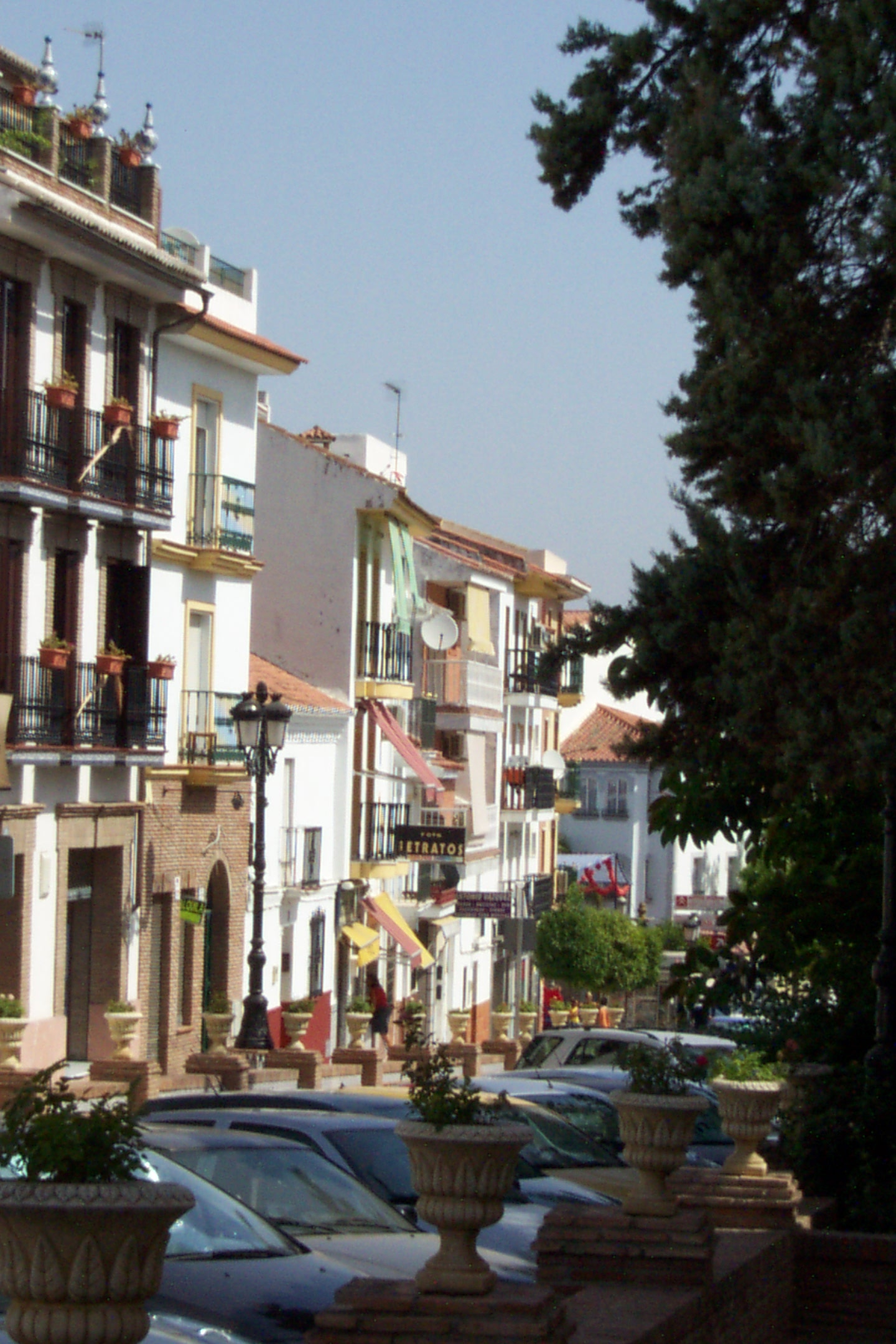
- Avenida de España.

- Flag Coat of arms

- Municipal location in the Province of Málaga

- Location in Spain.
- Coordinates: 36°40′N 4°33′W
- Country: Spain
- Autonomous community: Andalusia
- Province: Málaga
- Comarca: Valle del Guadalhorce

Government
  - Mayor: Joaquín Villanova (PP)

Area
  - Total: 83 km^{2} (32 sq mi)

Population (2025-01-01)
  - Total: 45,066
  - Density: 540/km^{2} (1,400/sq mi)
- Demonym: Alhaurinos or Torrealhaurinos
- Time zone: UTC+1 (CET)
  - Summer (DST): UTC+2 (CEST)
- Website: Official website

Alhaurín de la Torre is a town in the province of Málaga, Andalusia, in southern Spain. The town is part of Málaga Metropolitan Area and of the comarca of Valle del Guadalhorce. It sits at the entrance to the Guadalhorce valley on the slopes of the Sierra de Mijas mountains, some 17 km from Málaga.

The municipality covers an area of 82 km^{2} between the Sierra de Mijas and Málaga basin, and is crossed by the river Guadalhorce. It is the most populous municipality in the region of Guadalhorce and third within the province, with 33,567 inhabitants, behind Antequera and Ronda. Alhaurin de la Torre experienced a marked increase of population in the 90s due to the expansion of the metropolitan area of Málaga. The population density is 409.35 inhabitants/km^{2}.

The city was founded by the Phoenicians, mostly from Libya. Since 1991 it has been the headquarters of the Málaga Provincial Prison, just outside the city, which currently is one of the most well known in Spain, housing some of the special cases of social impact, like the Malaya case amongst others.

== Geography ==
The township sits between the Sierra de Mijas, mountain formation covered with pines and oaks and belongs to the Cordillera Penibética, and the Hoya de Málaga, alluvial depression formed by the Guadalhorce river, which irrigates the whole district and is occupied by numerous crop orchards. The highest peak of Alhaurín de la Torre is Mount Jabalcuza in the Sierra de Mijas, but also include others such as Jarapalo or Abarcuza.

=== Location ===
It borders the towns of Málaga to the east, Cártama to the north, Torremolinos to the southeast, Mijas to the southwest, Benalmádena to the south and Alhaurín el Grande to the west.

=== Hydrography ===
The hydrography of Alhaurin de la Torre is limited in terms of river inflows. These include the passage of the river Guadalhorce by the municipality along with numerous streams, the majority deviant, dry or with very little flow. The most notable is the water that is often left after some heavy rains in winter, spring or fall. Alhaurín de la Torre is one of the municipalities belonging to the Andalusian Mediterranean Basin.

== Description ==
The city centre has old Moorish-style streets and houses. Services are the main source of income.

It was historically an agrarian village, where citrus and subtropical fruit plantations and olive groves still cover the landscape.

== History ==
The origin of the place goes back to pre-historic times, and it is known that the Phoenicians that set up factories in Málaga and Cártama in about 1,000 BC settled in Alhuarín. It was here that Lauro was founded, and centuries later the Romans called it Lauro Vetus.

The Moors, after the Islamic conquest of Iberia, called it Albarracín, and it grew from that into a larger collection of farm-houses. The re-conquest of the town in 1485 meant another variation on the name, and the place was finally called Alhaurín de la Torre. The population increased sharply due to the influx of Christian settlers after 1571. There are many archaeological remains in the municipality, most of them being in the Estación de la Alquería area, officially designated as being of Cultural Interest.

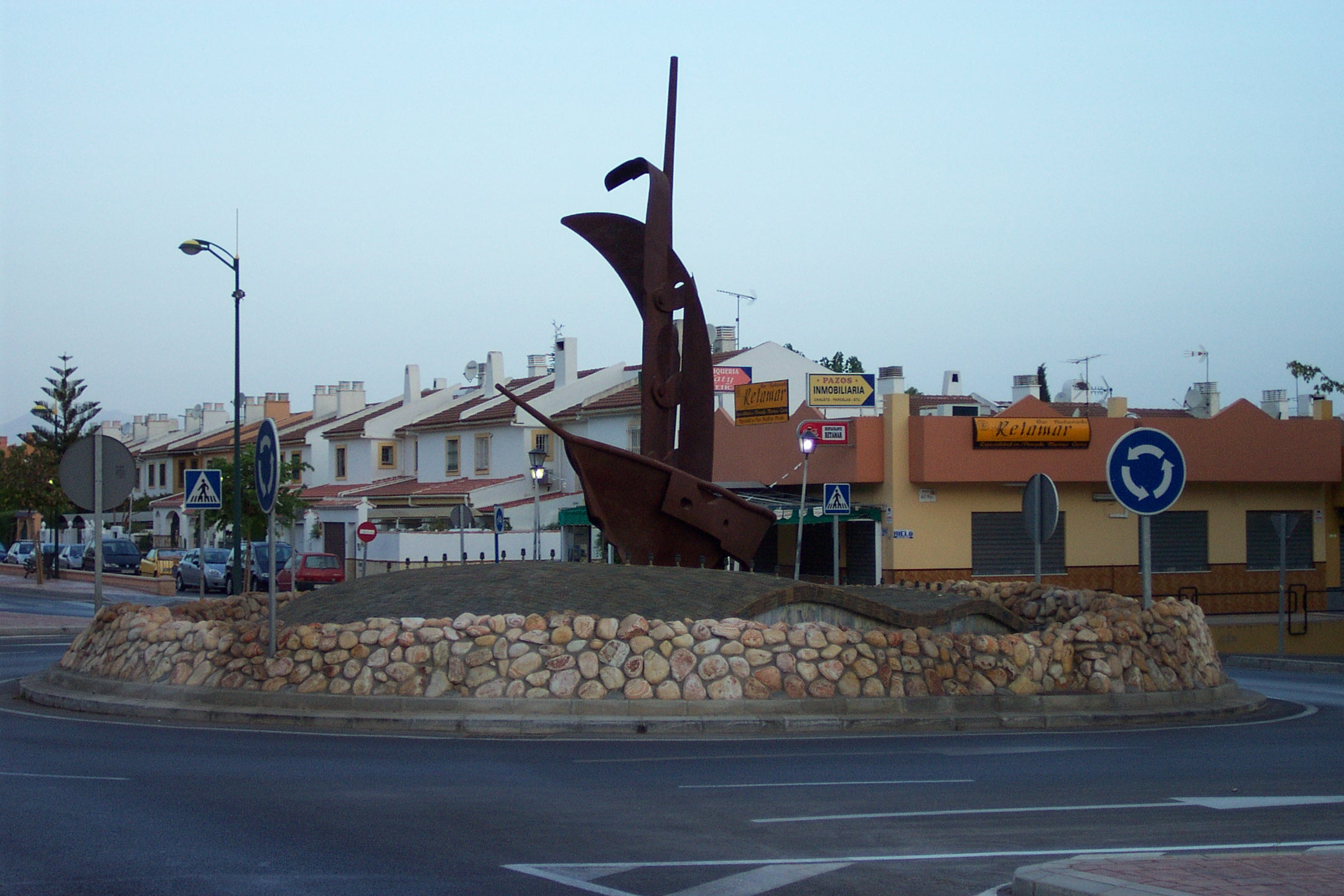
The Democracy Avenue, Alhaurín de la Torre

In 2021, the shopping district of Alhaurín de la Torre received media attention for its canopied shopping district, crocheted by local teacher Eva Pacheco and her students.

== Metropolitan Bus ==
Malaga Metropolitan Transport Consortium's (Consorcio de Tranpsporte Metropolitano del Área de Málaga) buses are the main form of transport around the town of Alora and the villages of the Metropolitan Area.

== Sister cities ==
- New Iberia, United States

== See also ==
- List of municipalities in Málaga
