= Alhaurín el Grande =

- Municipality
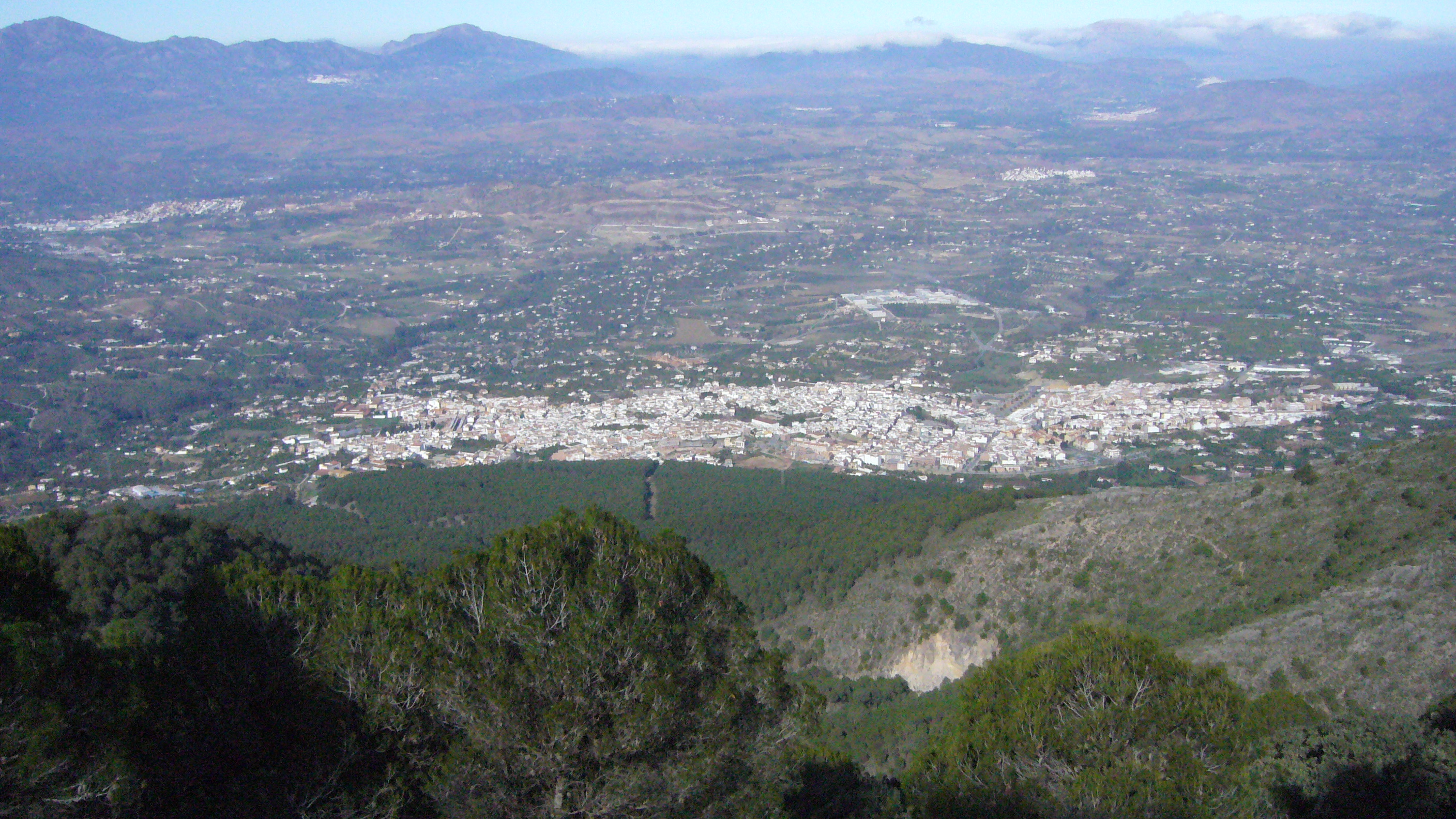

- Flag Coat of arms

- Municipal location in the Province of Málaga

- Location in Spain.
- Coordinates: 36°37′59″N 4°40′59″W
- Sovereign state: Spain
- Autonomous community: Andalusia
- Province: Málaga

Government
  - Mayor: Antonio Bermúdez Beltrón

Area
  - Total: 73.1 km^{2} (28.2 sq mi)
- Elevation: 270 m (890 ft)

Population (2025-01-01)
  - Total: 27,552
  - Density: 377/km^{2} (976/sq mi)
- Time zone: UTC+1 (CET)
  - Summer (DST): UTC+2 (CEST)
- Website: Official website

Alhaurín el Grande is a town located in the province of Málaga in the autonomous community of Andalusia in southern Spain.

It covers an area of 73.1 km^{2} extending from the northern slope of the Sierra de Mijas and the plain of the Guadalhorce river, where orchards of citrus and other fruit trees are found. The population is 27,552, as of 2025.

The origin of the name was given by the Moors, who called it "Alhaurin", where the Catholic Monarchs added "el Grande" to distinguish it from the neighbouring town of Alhaurín de la Torre after the conquest of both sites in 1485.

== Geography ==
Alhaurin el Grande is located on the north side of the Sierra de Mijas at a height of 326 metres above sea level, with a benign climate of mild winters and hot summers; more than two thirds of the days per year have sunshine. The town is situated between the river Fahala and the stream of Blas González, overlooking the "Hoya de Málaga", or vale of Málaga. It is 29 km from Málaga and 18 km from Marbella.

Its inhabitants are known as alhaurinos. It is the thirteenth largest city in the province of Málaga by population, after coastal municipalities, the cities of Ronda and Antequera and nearby Alhaurin de la Torre (2009). It has a population around 25,000, of which nearly 5% are estimated to be immigrants. It also contains the neighbourhoods of Chorro or San. Anton, el Bajondillo, San Isidro or Camino de Coin, la Huerta or el Barrio del Alemán, la Fama or the neighbourhood of Palustre, plus several developments such as La Paca, La Chíchara, El Cigarral or Sierra Gorda and the hamlet of Villafranco del Guadalhorce.

== History ==
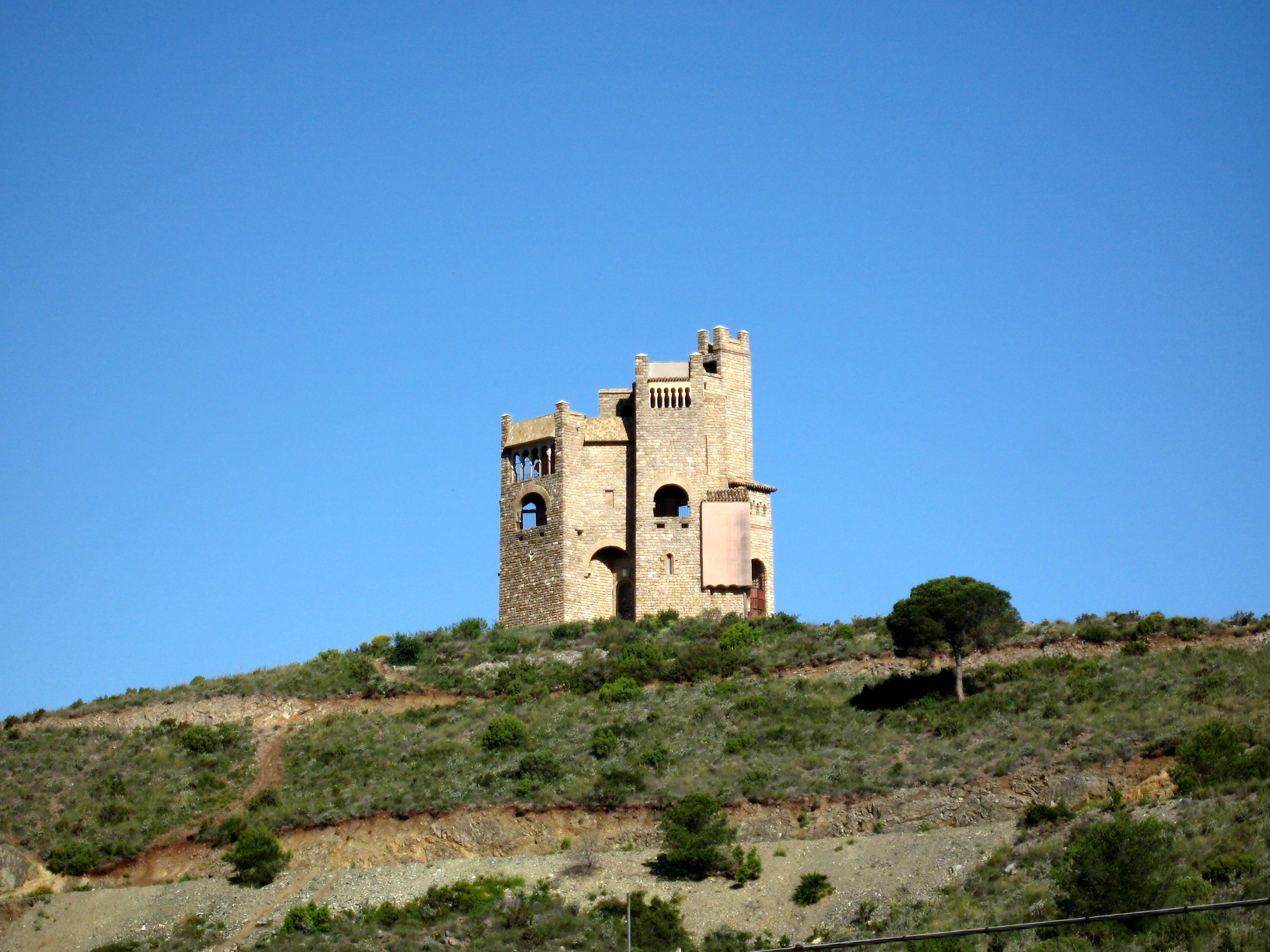
Derelict neo-Moorish water tower above Alhaurín el Grande

In the forested areas southeast of Alhaurín el Grande, there are traces of Neolithic occupation, witnesses to the long history of human habitation of the area. These remains were found at Las Huertas Altas and near La Casa Forestal. The area was subsequently inhabited by the Greeks, who brought improved agricultural techniques.

By the time the Romans arrived, the tiny Iberian settlement in the Sierra de Mijas was already well established, but if it had a name the Romans chose not to keep it. Instead they gave it one of their own: Lauro Nova. It was a spot apparently blessed by the gods: fertile, temperate, and surrounded by hills rich with valuable mineral deposits. Roman villas were built around the centre of the village and the hills are still dotted with their remains. There is also evidence of the existence of different settlements in various parts of the municipal territory of Alhaurin el Grande, such as Dehesa Baja Camino de Coín o la Alquería. The most important are those of the Fuente del Sol and Huerta del Niño, named after a burial with a tombstone of a young Roman having been discovered. Numerous Roman remains and objects such as columns, ceramics and coins have been found.

The town stagnated under the Visigoths, until the Moors took it on and built it a fortress on a hilltop called Torres de Fahala. The Moors also gave it a new name, Alhaurín, meaning "Garden of Allah". Like the Romans before them, they linked the township to a second to which they gave the same name, the two now being known as Alhaurín el Grande and Alhaurín de la Torre. To the Romans they had been Lauro Nova and Lauro Vetus.

The fort was destroyed in the destructive zeal of the Reconquista, but the village survived. In the following centuries the town suffered from invasions, epidemics of plague, and an earthquake in 1680. During the Peninsular War of 1808–14 it was occupied for four years by French troops and suffered considerable bombardment. In the 1950s, the outlying village of Villafranco del Guadalhorce was founded with subsidies from the Instituto Nacional de Colonización of the Spanish government. Recently, there have been large-scale building projects, which are being investigated for corrupt practices.

== Demography ==
From:INE Archiv

== Main sights ==
Some traces of the village's ancient past have survived, such as a 12th Century Moorish archway, the Arcos de Cobertizo. In the small square in front of the town hall, the Plaza del Ayuntamiento, are three Roman columns which were discovered close by at Fuente del Sol.

Other places of interest include:

- Iglesia de la Encarnación
- Ermita de San Sebastián
- Ermita de la Santa Vera Cruz
- Ermita del Cristo de las Agonías
- Ermita de San Antón
- Ruinas de la Fortaleza de Fahala o Castillo de la Reina
- Torre vigia de Urique
- Fuente Lucena o de los Doce Caños
- Molino de la Paca
- Molino morisco de los Corchos y de Maroto o Galiano
- Porton de San Rafael
- Casa Consistorial, Cripta del antiguo convento franciscano
- Casa-Hermandad Museo de la Hermandad de Nuestro Padre Jesús Nazareno
- Casa-Hermandad Museo de la Cofradía de la Santa Vera Cruz
- Museo del Pan, El Colmenero de Alhaurín
- Biblioteca Municipal "Ildefonso Marzo"
- Teatro Antonio Gala
- Parque La Libertad

== Transport ==
Malaga Metropolitan Transport Consortium's (Consorcio de Transporte Metropolitano del Área de Málaga) buses are the main form of transport around the city of Málaga and the villages of the Metropolitan Area. There are road connections to Torremolinos and Málaga, which has an airport. In 2010, a new road was built to connect the town to Fuengirola. There is a more mountainous road to Mijas.

== Notable people ==
- Antonio Tejero, Spanish former Lieutenant Colonel of the Guardia Civil, and the most prominent figure in the failed 1981 Spanish coup d'état attempt
- Gerald Brenan, a British writer and hispanist who spent much of his life in Spain and died in Alhaurin el Grande.

== See also ==
- List of municipalities in Málaga
