= Coín =

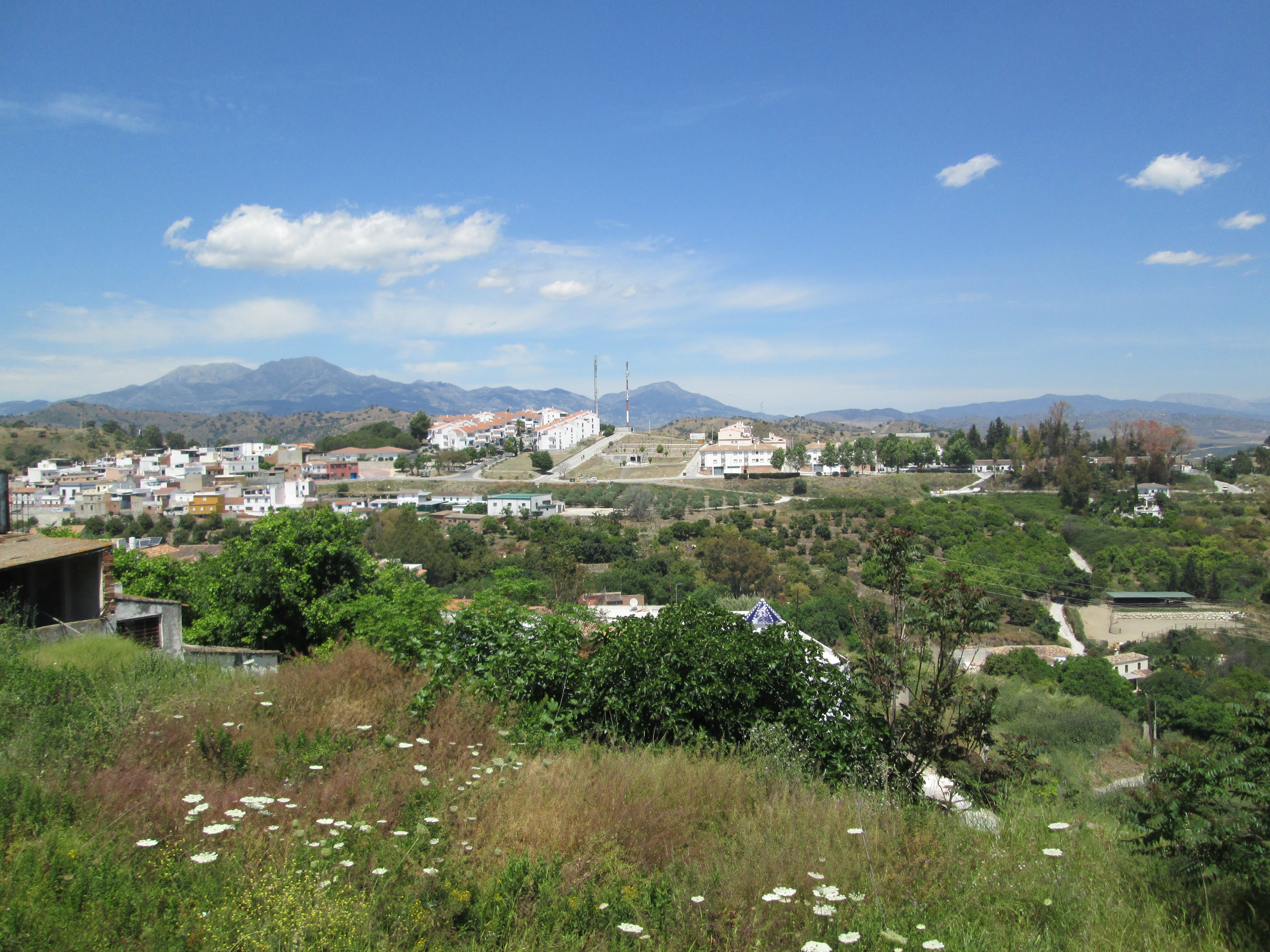

- Flag Coat of arms

- Location of the municipality of Coín

- Location of Coín in the Province of Malaga Location of Coín in Andalusia Location of Coín in Spain
- Coordinates: 36°40′N 4°45′W
- Sovereign state: Spain
- Autonomous community: Andalusia
- Province: Málaga
- Comarca: Valle del Guadalhorce

Government
  - Mayor: Francisco Javier Santos Cantos

Area
  - Total: 127.37 km^{2} (49.18 sq mi)
- Elevation: 202 m (663 ft)

Population (2025-01-01)
  - Total: 26,574
  - Density: 208.64/km^{2} (540.37/sq mi)
- Website: Official website

Coín (Spanish pronunciation: [koˈin]) is a town and municipality in the Province of Málaga, Spain, c. 33 km west of the provincial capital, Málaga, and about 30 km north of Marbella. The town has an official population of 22,000 inhabitants.

Foreigners now make up a substantial proportion of the town's inhabitants and are attracted to Coín because it is only 25 minutes from the beaches of Málaga and Marbella, including the 50 km stretch of coastline in between which includes the popular resorts of Torremolinos, Fuengirola and Benalmádena.

== History ==
The town was ruled by the Moors and the Romans, with the Moors invading and controlling the town from 929 AD until 1485, when the Christians took control of Coín.

Its ancient name was Dacaun which is from Arabic of unknown meaning; Coin is a corruption of this over time and bears no relation to the modern word coin, despite folk etymology associating it with this.

In 929 the area was caught up in the Muladí (Christian convert to Islam) rebellion which was led by Omar Ben Hafsun against the Emirate of Cordoba. Abderraman III, the first Caliph of Cordoba, fortified Coin, improving its defences to stave off the attacks of the muladí rebel.

== Climate ==
Coín has a mediterranean climate (Köppen climate classification: Csa) with mild, wet winters and hot to very hot, dry summers. Winter is generally the wettest season although it is not uncommon for there to be years in which autumn or spring are rainier. Temperatures rarely drop below 0 °C (32 °F), and snow is very rare, while during the summer, temperatures above 40 °C (104 °F) occur with some frequency.

On 14 November 2023, Coín reached a maximum temperature of 33.2 °C (91.8 °F), the highest temperature ever recorded in peninsular Spain for the month of November.

Climate data for Coín (2004-2025), extremes (2004–present)
Month	Jan	Feb	Mar	Apr	May	Jun	Jul	Aug	Sep	Oct	Nov	Dec	Year
Record high °C (°F)	29.0 (84.2)	27.9 (82.2)	31.8 (89.2)	35.4 (95.7)	39.0 (102.2)	41.8 (107.2)	44.5 (112.1)	44.1 (111.4)	41.6 (106.9)	37.6 (99.7)	33.2 (91.8)	29.9 (85.8)	44.5 (112.1)
Mean daily maximum °C (°F)	17.9 (64.2)	18.5 (65.3)	20.6 (69.1)	23.0 (73.4)	26.9 (80.4)	31.5 (88.7)	34.5 (94.1)	34.1 (93.4)	30.3 (86.5)	26.5 (79.7)	21.0 (69.8)	18.4 (65.1)	25.3 (77.5)
Daily mean °C (°F)	12.8 (55.0)	13.4 (56.1)	15.1 (59.2)	17.4 (63.3)	20.7 (69.3)	24.9 (76.8)	27.9 (82.2)	27.9 (82.2)	24.5 (76.1)	20.9 (69.6)	16.0 (60.8)	13.6 (56.5)	19.6 (67.3)
Mean daily minimum °C (°F)	7.6 (45.7)	8.3 (46.9)	9.7 (49.5)	11.7 (53.1)	14.5 (58.1)	18.4 (65.1)	21.3 (70.3)	21.7 (71.1)	18.6 (65.5)	15.4 (59.7)	10.9 (51.6)	8.7 (47.7)	13.9 (57.0)
Record low °C (°F)	−1.9 (28.6)	−0.3 (31.5)	2.3 (36.1)	5.3 (41.5)	6.7 (44.1)	11.8 (53.2)	16.5 (61.7)	15.4 (59.7)	13.6 (56.5)	6.3 (43.3)	2.9 (37.2)	2.3 (36.1)	−1.9 (28.6)
Average precipitation mm (inches)	63.7 (2.51)	63.3 (2.49)	99.3 (3.91)	48.6 (1.91)	26.2 (1.03)	3.0 (0.12)	0.2 (0.01)	0.9 (0.04)	34.7 (1.37)	66.2 (2.61)	74.6 (2.94)	81.2 (3.20)	561.9 (22.14)
Average precipitation days (≥ 1 mm)	4.7	4.9	6.9	5.0	3.0	0.8	0.0	0.4	2.5	4.4	5.0	4.9	42.5
Source: Agencia Estatal de Meteorologia (AEMET OpenData)

== Economy ==
The economy was traditionally agriculture, coexisting with marble mining (since Roman times) and ceramics. The latter has become very important and well known during the twentieth century, having a colour of its own called "Green Coin". The most important ceramics workshop during the past century was the "Cumbreras" workshop and now local artisans continue this 300-year-old, traditional, ceramic craft.

== Cinema city ==
The city of cinema was a project carried out in the area of Nacimiento to produce a television series, but was turned into a tourist area as well. For many years, Coín was the setting for several series, first the British Eldorado for the BBC, and after that the Andalusian serials "Plaza Alta" and "Arrayan", both recorded in Loasur studios produced by Linze TV, and shown by Canal Sur. Tourism, construction, and the hospitality industry have replaced old industries, although there are still many potters and several quarries where local marble, dolomite rock and sand are produced for construction materials.

== See also ==
- List of municipalities in Málaga
