= Almogía =

- Municipality
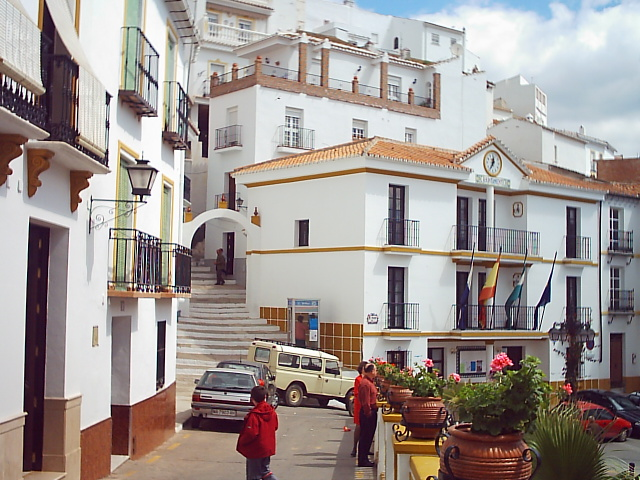

- Coat of arms

- Municipal location in the Province of Málaga

- Location in Spain
- Coordinates: 36°49′36″N 4°32′12″W
- Sovereign state: Spain
- Autonomous community: Andalusia
- Province: Málaga
- Comarca: Málaga-Costa del Sol

Government
  - Mayor: Cristóbal Torreblanca Sánchez (PSOE)

Area
  - Total: 164 km^{2} (63 sq mi)
- Elevation: 357 m (1,171 ft)

Population (2025-01-01)
  - Total: 4,269
  - Density: 26.0/km^{2} (67.4/sq mi)
- Demonym: Almogiense
- Time zone: UTC+1 (CET)
  - Summer (DST): UTC+2 (CEST)
- Postal code: 29150
- Website: www.almogia.es

Almogía is a town and municipality in the province of Málaga, part of the autonomous community of Andalusia in southern Spain. It is situated approximately 25 km from the city of Málaga, has a population of approximately 4,300 residents and has an economy based on the cultivation of almonds and olives. Positioned within the Montes de Málaga hills, the municipality's highest point is Santi Petri (794 m). The district's main watercourses are the River Campanillas and the Arroyos de Cauche and de los Olivos.

== See also ==
- List of municipalities in Málaga
