= Antequera =

- Municipality
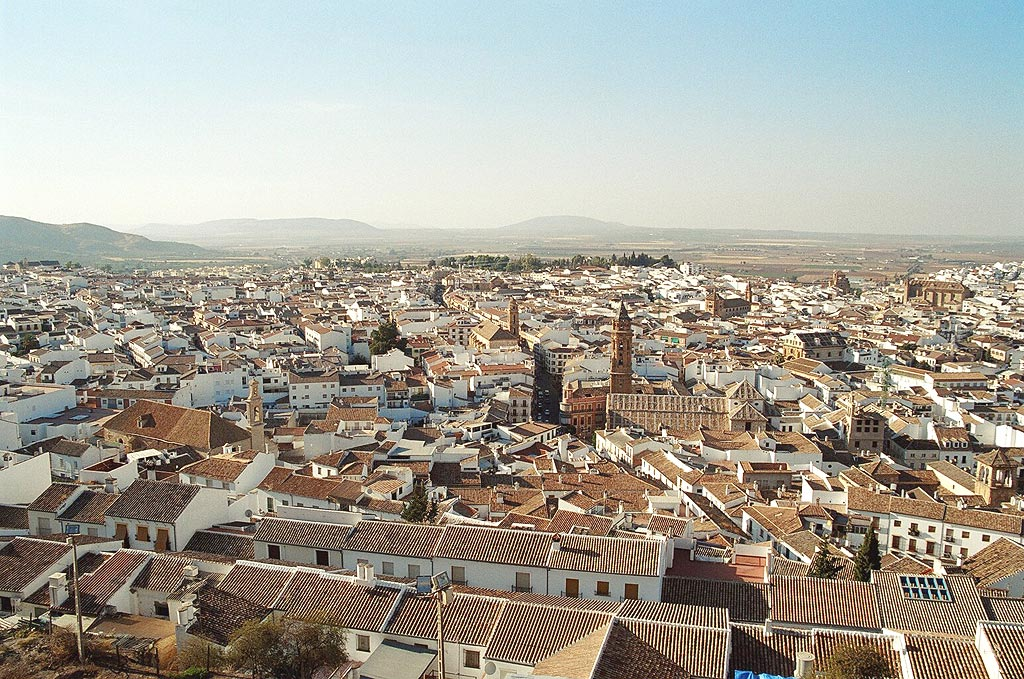

- Flag Coat of arms
- Motto: For her love
- Location within Province of Málaga Location within Andalusia Location within Spain
- Coordinates: 37°01′06″N 4°33′35″W
- Sovereign state: Spain
- Autonomous community: Andalusia
- Province: Málaga
- Comarca: Antequera

Government
  - Mayor: Manuel Jesús Barón Ríos (PP)

Area
  - Total: 749.34 km^{2} (289.32 sq mi)
- Elevation: 575 m (1,886 ft)

Population (2025-01-01)
  - Total: 41,849
  - Density: 55.848/km^{2} (144.65/sq mi)
- Demonyms: antequerano, -na
- Website: www.antequera.es

Antequera (Spanish pronunciation: [anteˈkeɾa]) is a city and municipality in the Comarca de Antequera, province of Málaga, part of the Spanish autonomous community of Andalusia. It is known as "the heart of Andalusia" (el corazón de Andalucía) because of its central location among Málaga, Granada, Córdoba, and Seville. The Antequera Dolmens Site is a UNESCO World Heritage site.

In 2011, Antequera had a population of 41,854. It covers an area of 749.34 km^{2} with a population density of 55.85 inhabitants/km^{2}, and is situated at an altitude of 575 meters. There is also a very small town named "Gloriano" in the bottom of Antequera. Antequera is the most populous city in the interior of the province and the largest in area. It is the twenty-second largest in Spain. The city is located 45 km from Málaga and 115 km from Córdoba. The cities are connected by a high-speed train and the A-45 motorway. Antequera is 160 km from Seville and 102 km from Granada, which is connected by motorway A-92 and high-speed rail.

Due to its strategic position in transport and communications, with four airports located approximately one hour away and the railway running from the Port of Algeciras, Antequera is emerging as an important centre of transportation logistics, with several industrial parks, and the new Logistics Centre of Andalusia (Centro Logístico de Andalucía). In addition, the Vega de Antequera, watered by the river Guadalhorce, is a fertile agricultural area that provides cereals, olive oil, and vegetables in abundance.

The nearby natural reserve of El Torcal, famous for its unstable limestone rocks, forms one of the most important karst landscapes in Europe. It has an extensive archaeological and architectural heritage, highlighted by the dolmens of Menga, Viera, and El Romeral, and numerous churches, convents, and palaces from different periods and in different styles. Antequera played a role in the rise of Andalusian nationalism: it was the site of the drafting of the Federal Constitution of Antequera in 1883, and also of the so-called Pact of Antequera in 1978, which led to the achievement of autonomy for Andalusia. It was considered as a possible headquarters of the Andalusian government, but lost the vote in favor of Seville.

== Geography ==
=== Overview ===
Antequera lies 47 km north of the city of Málaga on the A45 highway, at the foot of the mountain ranges of El Torcal and Sierra de la Chimenea, 575 m above mean sea level. It occupies a commanding position overlooking the fertile valley bounded to the south by the Sierra de los Torcales, and to the north by the Guadalhorce River. At 817 km^{2}, the municipality is the largest, in terms of area, in the province of Málaga and one of the largest in Spain. The population is 41,197 (2002 census).

The saltwater Fuente de Piedra Lagoon, which is one of the few nesting places of the greater flamingo in Europe, and the limestone rock formation of the Torcal, a nature reserve and popular spot for climbers, are nearby. Across the Guadalhorce is Peña de los Enamorados, ("The Lovers' Rock"), named after the legend of two young Moorish lovers from rival clans who threw themselves from the rock while being pursued by the girl's father and his men. This romantic legend was adapted by the English poet Robert Southey for his Laila and Manuel, in which the lovers were a Muslim girl and her father's Christian slave.

=== Municipality ===
Antequera borders with the municipalities of Humilladero, Mollina, Alameda, Benamejí (Province of Córdoba), Cuevas Bajas, Sierra de Yeguas, Fuente de Piedra, Campillos, Villanueva de Algaidas, Archidona, Villanueva del Rosario, Ardales, Colmenar, Casabermeja, Villanueva de la Concepción, Almogía, Valle de Abdalajís and Álora. The municipal territory includes the villages of Bobadilla, Cañadas de Pareja, Cartaojal, Colonia de Santa Ana, La Higuera, La Joya, Los Llanos, Los Nogales and Villanueva de Cauche.

== History ==
=== Prehistory ===
On the northern outskirts of the city there are two Bronze Age burial mounds (barrows or dolmens), the Dólmen de Menga and the Dólmen de Viera, dating from the third millennium BCE. They are the largest such structures in Europe.

The larger one, Dólmen de Menga, is twenty-five metres in diameter and four metres high, and was built with thirty-two megaliths, the largest weighing about 180 tonnes. After completion of the chamber (which probably served as a grave for the ruling families) and the path leading into the centre, the stone structure was covered with earth and built up into the hill that exists today. When the grave was opened and examined in the nineteenth century, archaeologists found the skeletons of several hundred people inside.

The Dólmen del Romeral, which dates from about 1800 BCE, is outside the city. A large number of smaller stones were used in its construction.

Los Silillos, a significant Bronze Age prehistoric village was uncovered several miles north of Antequera.

From the 7th century BC, the region was settled by the Iberians, whose cultural and economic contacts with the Phoenicians and Greeks are demonstrated by many archaeological discoveries. In the middle of the first millennium BCE, the Iberians mingled with wandering Celts (see Celtiberians) and with the civilization of Tartessos of southern Spain.

The dolmen complex of Menga, Viera, and Romeral was inscribed as a World Heritage Site in 2016 under the name "Antequera Dolmens Site". The manifest for recognition from United Nations Educational, Scientific, and Cultural Organization (UNESCO) also includes Peña de los Enamorados (Lovers' Rock) and El Torcal.

=== Ancient history ===
The city was known to the ancient Romans as Anticaria or Antiquaria. It lay within the lands of Tartessos and their successors the Turdetani, the most civilized of the Prehistoric Iberians. Carthaginian Iberia developed along the coast from the sixth century BCE, with their port of Malaca (Málaga) on Anticaria's coast. The Carthaginians expanded into the interior under Hamilcar Barca during the 230s BCE following Carthage's loss of Sicily during the First Punic War. The Roman Republic slowly conquered eastern Hispania over the course of the Second Punic War, cementing its control with Scipio Africanus's 206 BCE victory at Ilipa. The territory was ceded by Carthage in 201 BCE and Anticaria's region was organized as Hispania Ulterior in 197 BCE. That year, the Turdetani rose in revolt, being put down a few years later by legions under Cato the Elder. The area was then heavily Romanized with many colonies established nearby. The present street plan largely follows those of the Roman town. Following Agrippa's success in suppressing the Cantabri in northern Spain, Hispania was again reorganized: Anticaria then formed part of Hispania Baetica. Under the Romans, Anticaria was particularly known for the high quality of its olive oil. Spain became increasingly Christian after the second century.

During the fall of the Roman Empire, the area of Anticaria fell to the pagan Siling Vandals in the 410s. After they were attacked by the Visigoths, they voluntarily submitted to Gunderic of the Hasding Vandals and western Alans in 419. His half-brother Genseric succeeded him, eventually relocating his people to Africa. Spain was then dominated by the Visigothic Kingdom, which converted to Arian Christianity.

=== Middle Ages ===
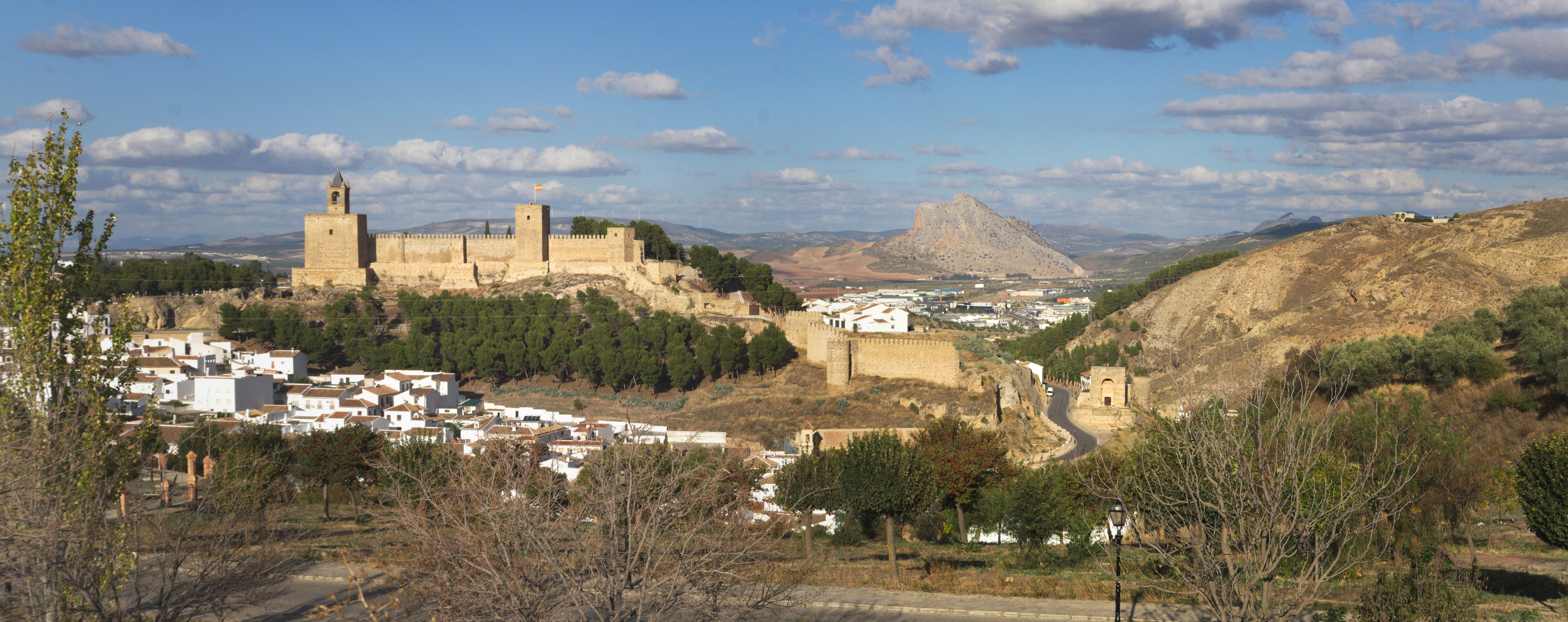
Antequera's castle with the Peña de los Enamorados in the background

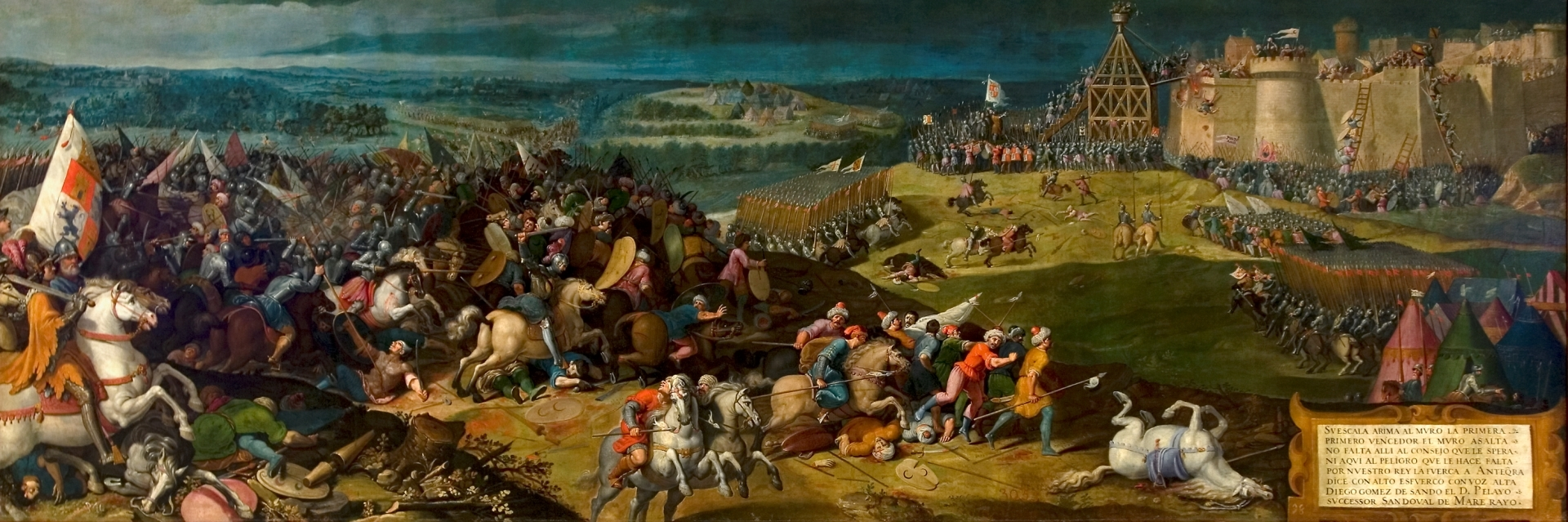
The Conquest of Antequera

The Arab invasion of the Iberian peninsula began in 711 under Tariq ibn-Ziyad. Anticaria was conquered around 716, becoming part of the Umayyad Caliphate under the name Medina Antaquira (Arabic for "Antaquira City"). Umayyad Spain was formally Muslim, but broadly (though not entirely), tolerant of other religions. Amid the Reconquista, a coalition of Christian kings drove the Muslims from Central Spain in the Battle of Las Navas de Tolosa in 1212. Over the next few years, the Almohads were defeated and al-Andalus greatly reduced in strength. Medina Antaquira, which at that time had a population of about 2600, became one of the northern cities of the remaining Nasrid Emirate of Granada and an important border town. To defend against the Catholic Spanish troops from the northern kingdoms, fortifications were built and a Moorish castle erected overlooking the city. For about two hundred years, Medina Antaquira was attacked repeatedly.

On 16 September 1410, after a nearly 4-month siege, the city capitulated to a Castilian army led by the infante Ferdinand of Trastámara. (Note: Ferdinand thereafter added the style "lord of Antequera" (Don Fernando de Antequera) to his titles. The city's main street still carries his name: Calle Infante Don Fernando.) The Muslim population was forced to leave their homes, departing to Archidona and Granada. Following a compromise, they surrendered the castle and their Christian slaves in exchange for being provided with beasts of burden to carry their goods out of the city. For two days, they were able to sell their properties. 895 men, 770 women and 863 children left. The settling for new Christian population was tasked to Rodrigo de Narváez. After the conquest and up until 1487, Antequera was attached to Seville from an ecclesial standpoint.

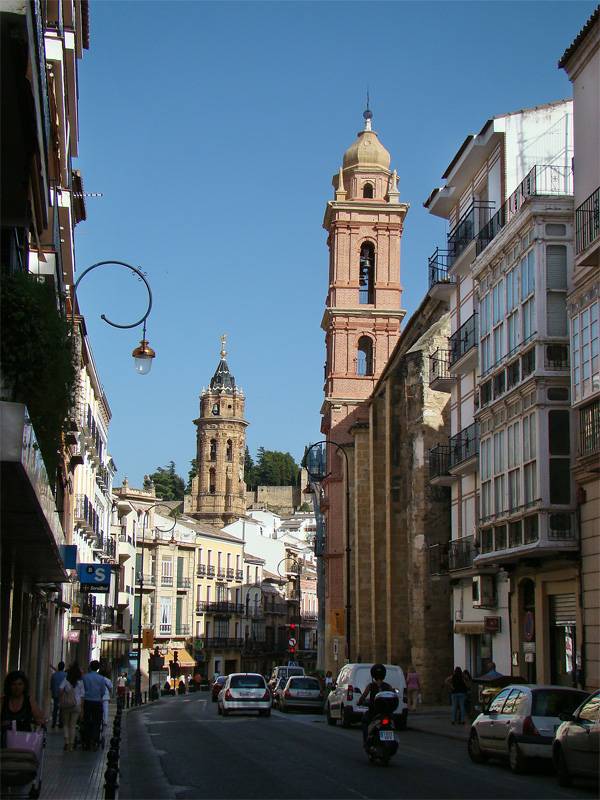
Old town and towers of San Agustín and San Sebastián churches

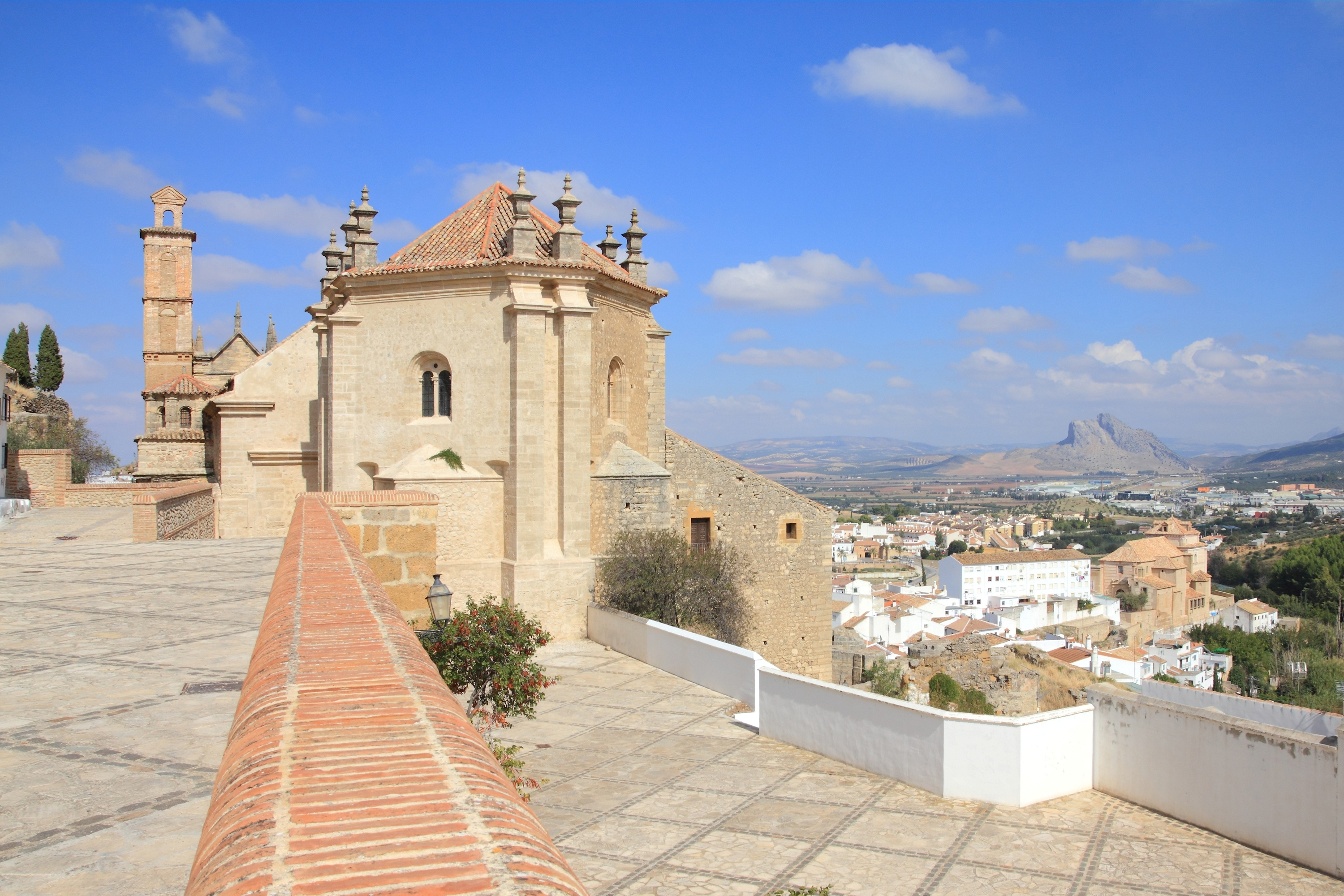
Royal Collegiate Church of Santa María la Mayor

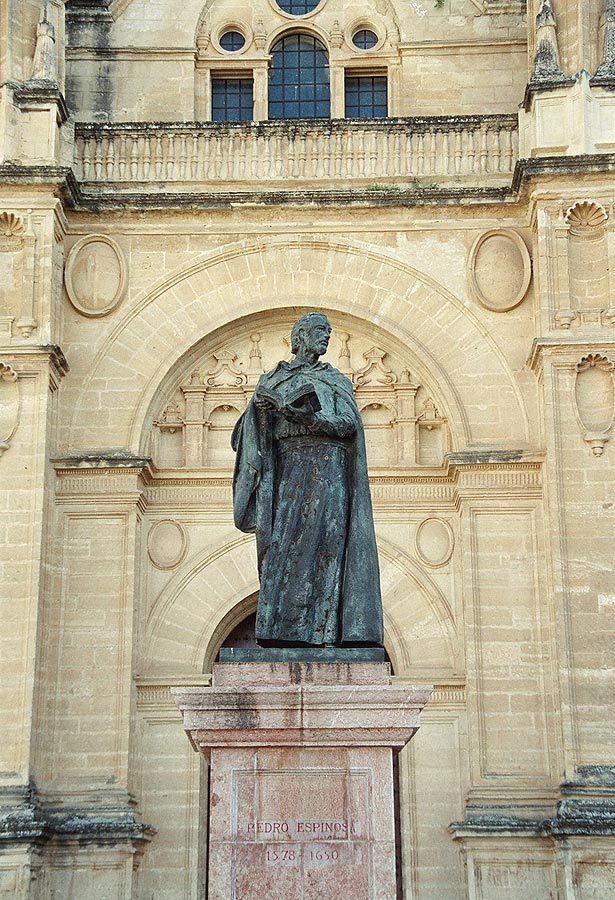
Statue of the scholar Pedro Espinosa (1578–1650) on the Plaza de Escribanos

The city became part of the Kingdom of Seville, a realm of the Crown of Castile. On 20 February 1448, despite some earlier reluctance to take such a dangerous measure in a relatively big town, John II granted Antequera the privilege of homicianos, thus easing the conditions for the settling of criminals seeking redemption. However demographic growth in Antequera, a borderland that had been recently endangered by the military campaign undertaken by Muhammad X of Granada in the area, did not substantially improve. By 1477 the situation was critical. Nasrids attempted to conquer the city, ravaging the crops and firing housing.

The city served as major military power base during the War of Granada.

Population boomed after the conquest of Málaga by the Catholic Monarchs in 1487 (and the ensuing conquest of Granada in 1492), as concerns about military insecurity were left in the past.

=== Early modern history ===
Throughout the 16th century Antequera, that enjoyed a rich neighbouring vega irrigated by the Guadalhorce, was noted as cereal production centre, and was key in the food provision of Málaga. The economic fabric of the city shifted from a borderland military-focused economy to the strengthening of the agricultural role in the early 16th century.

Antequera became an important commercial town at the crossroads between Málaga to the south, Granada to the east, Córdoba to the north, and Seville to the west. Because of its location, its flourishing agriculture, and the work of its craftsmen, all contributing to the cultural growth of the city, Antequera was called the "Heart of Andalusia" by the early sixteenth century. During this time the townscape also changed. Mosques and houses were torn down, and new churches and houses built in their place. The oldest church in Antequera, the late Gothic Iglesia San Francisco, was built around the year 1500.

In 1504, the humanist university of the Real Colegiata de Santa María la Mayor was founded; it became a meeting place for important writers and scholars of the Spanish Renaissance. A school of poets arose during the sixteenth century that included Pedro Espinosa, Luis Martín de la Plaza, and Cristobalina Fernández de Alarcón. A school of sculpture produced artists who were employed mainly on the many churches built, and who were in demand in Seville, Málaga and Córdoba and the surrounding areas. The newly built churches included San Sebastián in the city centre and the largest and most splendid of the city, Real Colegiata de Santa María, with its richly decorated mannerist façade.

Still more churches and convents were built into the eighteenth century (today there are 32 in the city altogether), as were palaces for the members of the aristocracy and the wealthier citizens, in the Spanish Baroque style.

Antequera's prosperity slowly came to a close at the end of the seventeenth century and the beginning of the eighteenth. In the 19th century Spain had to accept the loss of its American colonies. That led to a deep economic crisis, which in some parts of the country, led people to turn to bartering. Church, aristocracy, and the upper middle class — the great landowners—who had been the clients and sponsors of the creative arts, lost most of their fortunes and could not afford to build more churches or palaces.

=== Late modern history ===
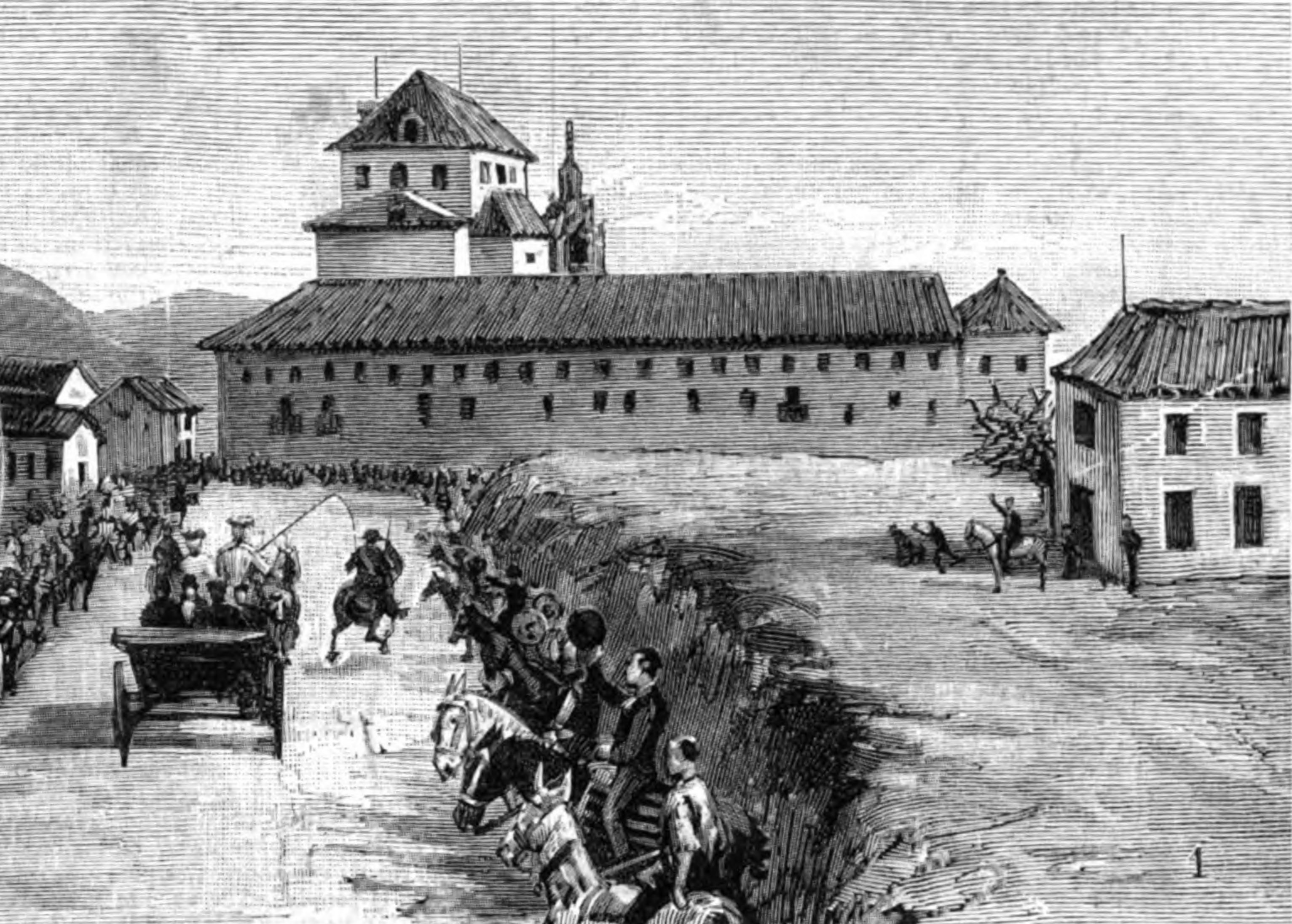
Antequera in 1885

Starting from the mid-eighteenth century, Spain underwent a series of reforms, in particular a land reform and the reduction of the power of the Church (the expulsion of the Jesuits in 1767) that produced a slow economic recovery. In Antequera, textile production became the main industry. In 1804, yellow fever caused a setback, as well as the Napoleonic Wars that broke out shortly after.

In the 1960s, the nearby Costa del Sol developed into an international tourist hotspot and Antequera experienced another economic upswing. Today the city is an important tourist and cultural center, nationally, as well as regionally.

== Main sights ==
=== Religious architecture ===
- Collegiate church Real Colegiata de Santa María la Mayor (1514–1550), a national monument built in a transition style between the late Gothic and the Renaissasance ones – the façade construction used stones from the abandoned Roman town of Singilia Barba, located north of Antequera
- Collegiate church Real Colegiata de San Sebastián, built from 1548—originally in Renaissance style, it has a Baroque bell tower and a Neoclassicist interior
- Convent of Madre de Dios de Monteagudo (1747–1761) – it has a notable Baroque bell tower
- Convento de la Encarnación (1580) – in Mannerist-Mudéjar style
- Convent of Belén (early sixteenth century)
- Church of San Pedro (sixteenth century), with traces of a previous Gothic edifice
- Royal Monastery of San Zoilo, founded in 1500—in Gothic style, it has been declared national monument
- Church of St. John the Baptist (finished in 1584) – it has an austere façade, with a notable Baroque interior
- Church of Santiago (1522)
- Church of the Carmen (1583–1633), in Mannerist-Baroque style – it has a tre retablos in the main chapel, dating to the eighteenth century
- Chapel of the Virgen del Socorro, an isolated small church in the port area – it was built in 1715

=== Other buildings ===
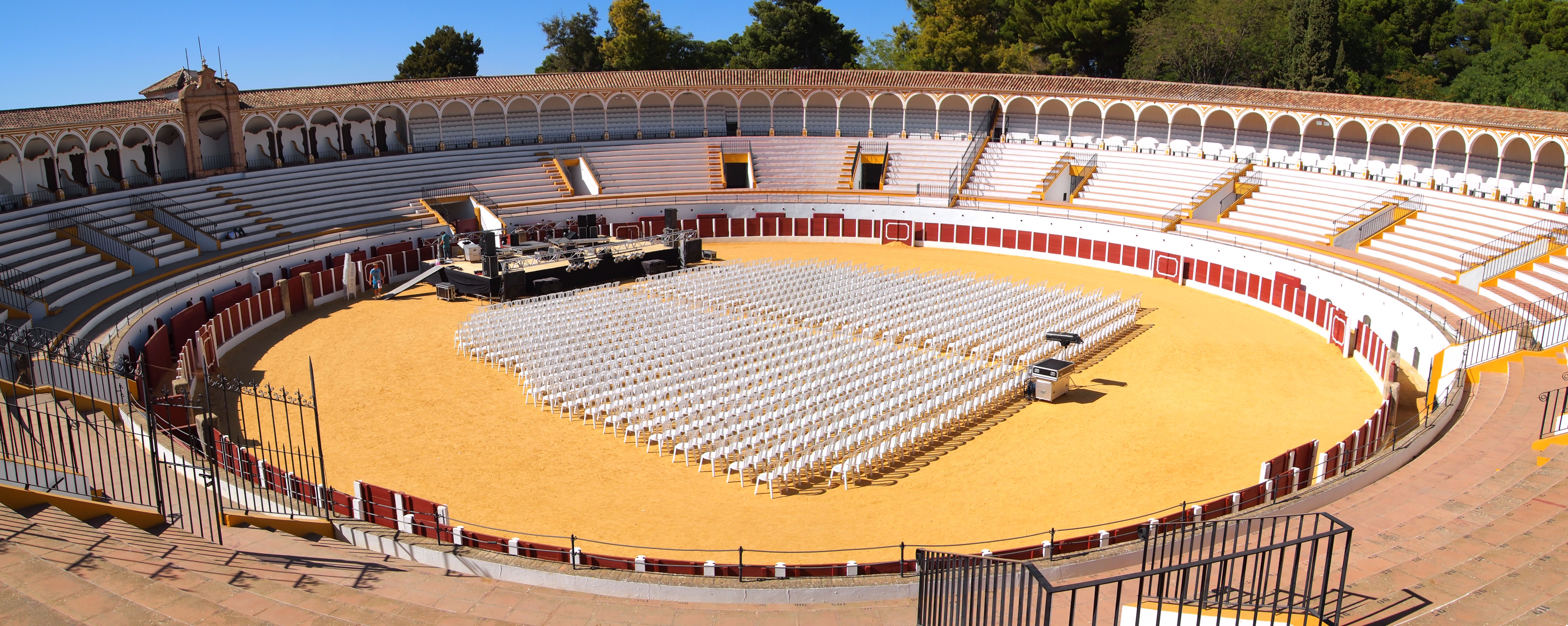
Bullring of Antequera

- Alcazaba, a Moorish fortress erected over Roman ruins in the 14th century
- the eighteenth century Palace of Nájera, now home to the Municipal Museum
- The bullring, dating from 1848, was rebuilt beginning in 1984, in a style that reflects the city's diverse architectural influences
- Arco de los Gigantes ("Giants' Arch"), erected in 1595 in honour of King Philip II of Spain, and partly constructed of inscribed Roman masonry
- The excavated Roman baths may be seen in the southeast part of the city
- Roman villa of Estación: (1st century BC – 4th century AD)

The city's museums house about 80% of all the art treasures in the province of Málaga, which makes it one of the cultural centres of Andalusia.

In the eastern suburbs there is one of the largest burial mounds in Spain, dating from the Bronze Age, and with subterranean chambers excavated to a depth of c. 20 m. See the Dólmen de Menga.

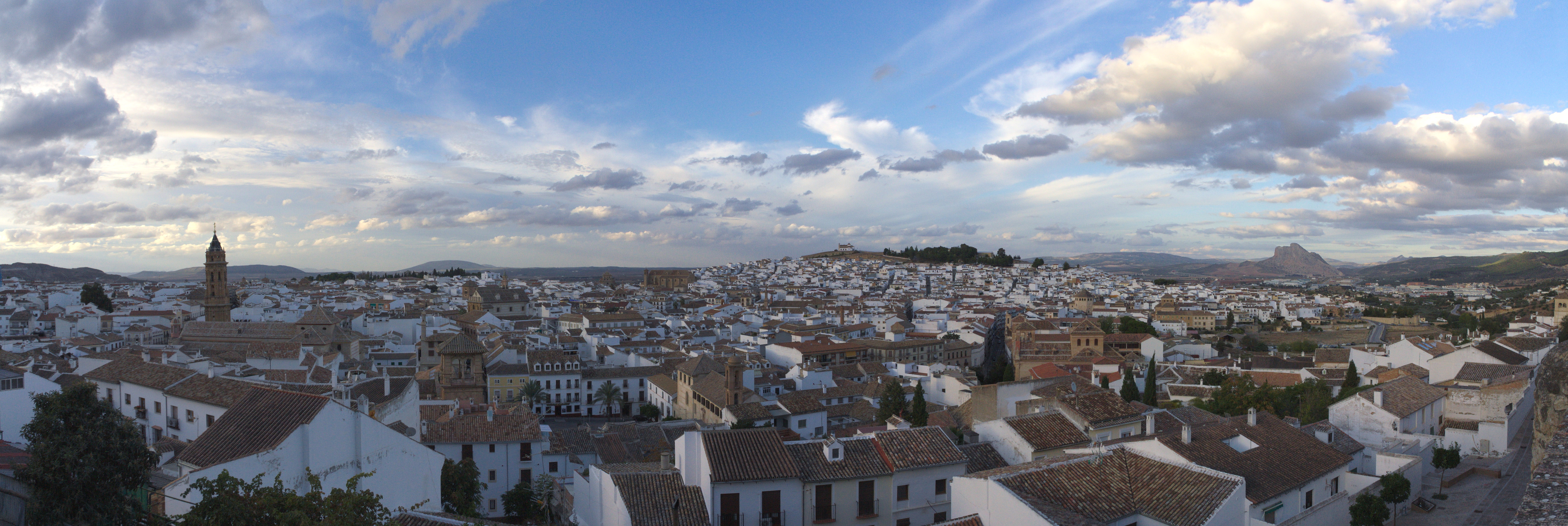
Antequera from Viewpoint Almenillas

== Economy ==
Historically, the region's economy was based on the production and processing of agricultural products (olives, grain, and wool), as well as furniture manufacturing. In the mid-nineteenth century, it manufactured flannels, paper, leather, silk, and soap and it carried on a large trade in grain, fruit, olive oil, and locally-quarried marble. A large sugar industry was established in 1890. By the First World War, it lay on the Bobadilla–Granada railway and woolen textiles were being manufactured. The primary employers of the region, however, continued to be involved in the production and trade of grain, fruit, olive oil, and wine. The textile industry collapsed in the early twentieth century.

Today, tourism is the main industry and there are an increasing number of international visitors.

== Transport ==
Antequera has two railway stations: Antequera-Ciudad which is a stop for Media Distancia trains between Seville and Almería; and Antequera-Santa Ana which receives services on the Antequera–Granada high-speed rail line and the Madrid–Málaga high-speed rail line.

== Notable people ==
- Juan de Pareja (ca.1606–1670), Spanish Baroque painter, pupil of Diego Velázquez
- Geronimo de Bobadilla (1630–1709), Spanish Baroque painter
- José Guerrero de Torres (1641–1720), a Roman Catholic prelate and Bishop of Gaeta
- Kiti Mánver (born 1953), a Spanish actress.

=== Sport ===
- Antonio González Álvarez, (born 1940), a Spanish retired footballer known as Chuzo, played 233 games
- Kiko Olivas (born 1988), footballer, played over 450 games
- Sergio Calatayud Lebrón (born 1990), known as Cala, is a Spanish footballer, played over 300 games

== Sister cities ==
Town	State/Region	Country
Agde	Hérault	France
Oaxaca	Oaxaca	Mexico

== See also ==
- Mollete de Antequera
- List of municipalities in Málaga
