= José María Hinojosa Lasarte =

Writer and poet from Andalusia

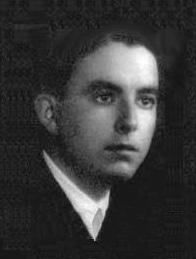
- Born: José María Hinojosa Lasarte; 17 September 1904; Campillos, Spain
- Died: 22 August 1936 (aged 31); Málaga, Spain
- Occupations: Landowner, publisher and writer
- Known for: Poetry
- Political party: Carlism, Agrarism

José María Hinojosa Lasarte (17 September 1904 – 22 August 1936) was a Spanish writer and political militant. As a man of letters he is considered one of the first if not the very first and the only genuinely surrealist poet in Spain, counted also among members of Generation ‘27. Following an alleged visit to the Soviet Union, he shifted, to the shock and horror of his surrealist colleagues, from Stalinism towards Carlism, the Catholic Church in Spain, and the Agrarian Party. These beliefs made him highly sceptical of the Second Spanish Republic when it was declared in 1931 and ultimately caused him to fall victim to the Red Terror by the Republican faction during the subsequent Spanish Civil War. Following more than half a century of oblivion, his memory and especially the circumstances of his abduction and murder have become a counter-reference in politically-charged discussions about the similar murder of fellow poet Federico García Lorca during the White Terror.

== Family and youth ==
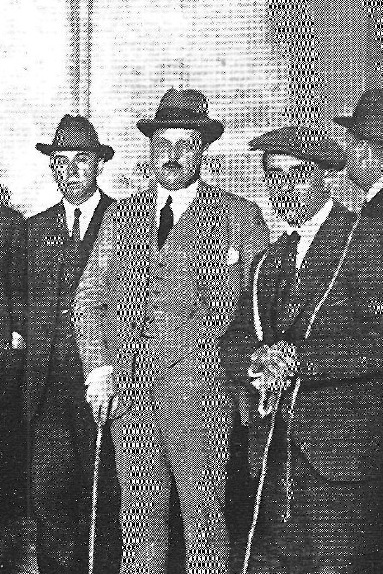
father (middle)

According to the family legend the forefathers of José María descended from Moctezuma; according to historical records the Carvajals were first noted in Málaga province in the 16th century, having founded the town of Campillos. Along the strictly male paternal line the Hinojosas, another local family, throughout the centuries as wealthy landholders ensured their dominant position in the county. The list of Campillos’ mayors reads like the Hinojosa genealogical tree; also José María's father Salvador Hinojosa Carvajal (1869–1936) and his uncle held the alcaldia post in the late Restoration period; Salvador, influential within the local conservative realm, served also as diputado provincial. In 1893 he married Asunción Lasarte Xuarez (1872–1932), descendant to another affluent landholder family from the nearby Estepa. The couple lived on family estates in Campillos and Alameda; they had 6 children, José María born as the second oldest son.

Hinojosa and his siblings were brought up in luxury and under heavy religious influence, the latter mostly due to their mother. Certain scholars suggest that Asunción's strong Catholic conviction bordered on tyranny. From infancy, José María was described as serious, withdrawn, addicted to reading, and having a penchant for extravagance. In 1915 he entered the Colegio de San Fernando in Málaga and possibly also the Jesuit college of San Estanislao; he graduated in 1920. In 1921–1922 he attended preparatory law courses at the Universidad de Granada before moving to Madrid in 1923, where he enrolled at the Facultad de Derecho. After a 1925–1926 spell in Paris – either to improve his French or to prepare for diplomatic service – Hinojosa returned to Spain and completed his curriculum in 1926. He spent most of 1927 serving in the military as a soldier in the capital. He completed his service in 1928.

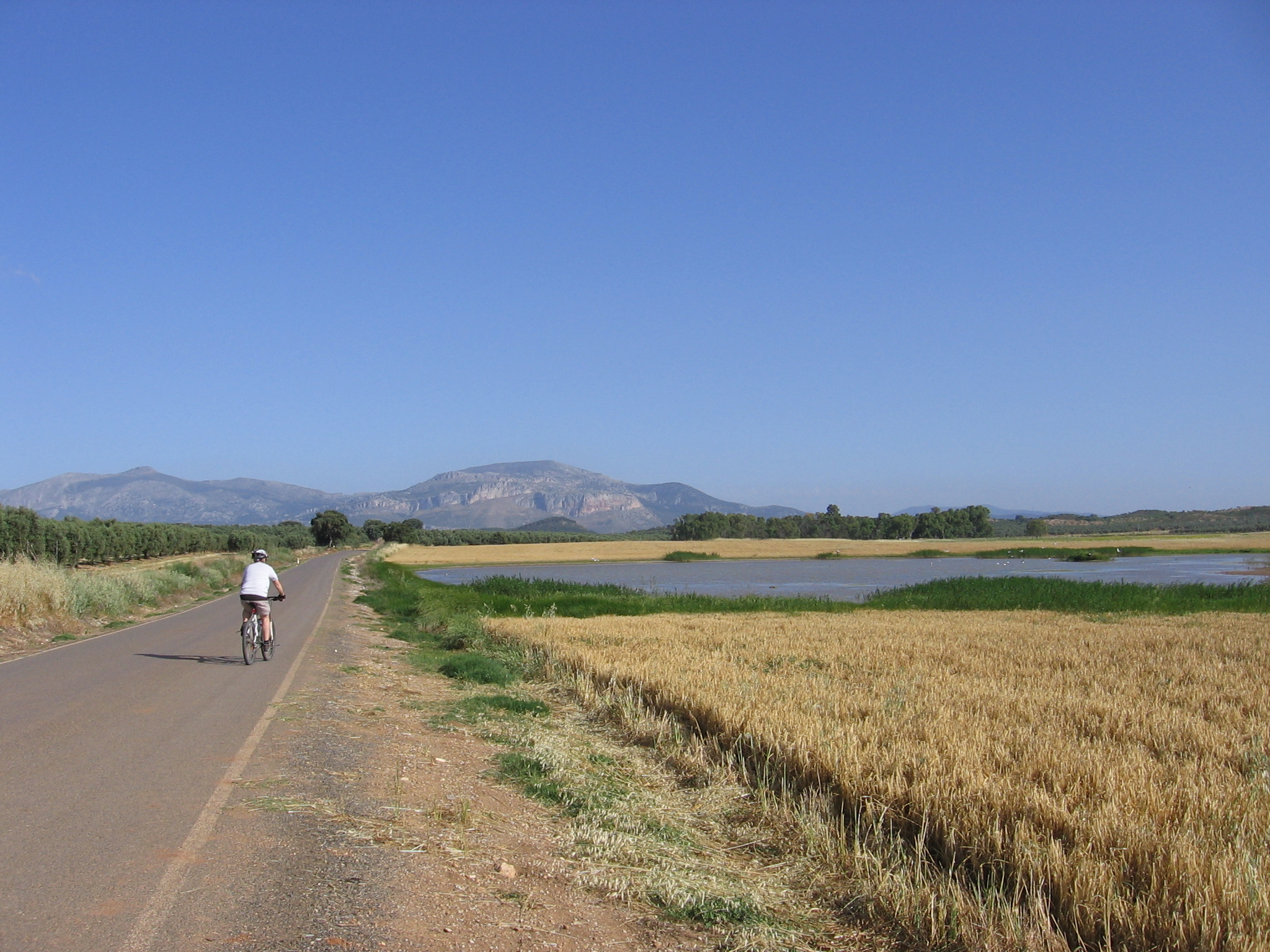
Campillos county

The years of 1928–1930 were mostly bohemian in Málaga, combined with journeys across Andalusia and abroad. Apart from trips to France and England, Hinojosa visited Nordic countries and toured the USSR, perhaps the first of this sort permitted by the Soviet authorities. Partly living with his family, he also began to engage in the family business, which apart from landholdings also includes industrial exploration activities. Around that time, he fell in love with Ana Freüller Valls, an aristocrat, granddaughter to Juan Valera and a local aviation pioneer. Their relationship proved to be a complex and erratic one. Hinojoisa hoped for marriage and indeed Freüller later admitted that at one point they were about to marry; however, she also claimed that they were simply close friends. The affair went on until Hinojosa's death; he was never married and had no children.

== Literary career ==
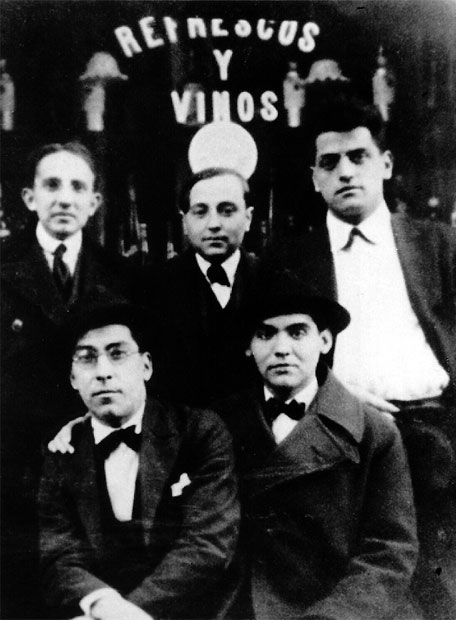
Spanish surrealists in Madrid, 1923

In the early 1920s, Hinojosa began his career in Málaga with Emilio Prados as his literary mentor. In 1923, he co-founded Ambos, a literary review. Vaguely anchored in Andalusian rural myths it embraced aspects of the eclectic avant-garde, including dadaism, futurism and expressionism; apart from juvenile poems contributed by its founders, the periodical also printed works of García Lorca, Laffón Zambrano and Salazar Chapela. With circulation limited mostly to acquaintances, Ambos stopped after just 4 issues. Hinojosa's writing matured in Paris, where he joined the circle of young Spanish artists: apart from already befriended Prados and Lorca the group included Buñuel, Dalí and a number of later famous writers and painters. Though styled after Rimbaud, in terms of poetry Hinojosa was described as a surrealist; the poems he contributed to reviews like La Verdad or Verso y prosa, but especially the volumes he published in 1925–1927, are considered a stepping stone towards full literary maturity.

Hinojosa's writings climaxed in 1928 with the publication of further two volumes, considered the peak embodiment of his surrealism. In the late 1920s, he got involved in Imprenta Sur, a friendly Málaga publishing house and especially in the launch of Litoral, another Málaga-based avant-gardist literary review. He contributed as editor and poet, specifically involved in the 1929 commemorative issue dedicated to Góngora; at that time he also engaged financially and entered the board; later Hinojosa intended to launch a strictly surrealist periodical. Due to his poetry and bohemian lifestyle but also because of somewhat anti-religious if not nearly blasphemous motives of his writings, in the local Málaga milieu he was already enjoying the reputation of an extravagant iconoclast. Hinojosa reinforced this image by staging social provocations scandalizing both iconic intellectuals like Valle-Inclan and plain rural Andalusians; he was willingly assisted by acquaintances like Dalí and his new female partner Gala.

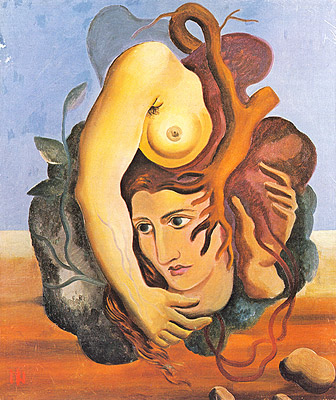
typical surrealist imagery

Hinojosa's relations with his avant-garde group of companions remained ambiguous. Though admitted to their inner circle, behind his back and to some extent also up front he was ridiculed as a wealthy señorito and mocked as a poor author who fathered disastrous poetry, never really a genuine member of the group; Diego, Lorca, Dalí or Buñuel used to denigrate him. Many treated him as a sponsor rather than as a fellow writer; they stayed at his premises, travelled with him and dined at his cost, considering it useful to be on close terms with "bohemian with the current account"; some re-paid with own works, and this is how Hinojosa gathered a collection of paintings of Miró, Picasso, Gris, Dalí and Bores. Literary critique either ignored him or belittled him. It is not clear whether the complex setting contributed to the violent and apocalyptic tone of Hinojosa's last poetic volume, to be published in 1930, withdrawn from print and issued in early 1931. It turned out to be his farewell to belles-letres; according to some the poet decided to dump literature, "commit literary suicide" and not to look back.

== Works ==
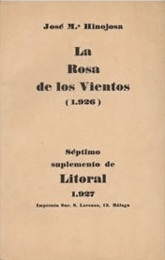
La Rosa de Los Vientos, 1927

Hinojosa penned around 200 poems, mostly short and some very short ones; short prose is down to 14 texts evading typical categorization, while theatrical and novelist attempts did not survive until today. All works were written between 1923 and 1930; during his lifetime they were published in 6 limited-circulation volumes and few periodicals. His literary production is considered a curve, from early juvenile works to surrealist climax and a final descent. Another scholar singles out 4 phases: descriptive, transitory, autobiographical and catastrophic.

Early poems, from these printed in Ambos to Poema del Campo (1925), are anchored in rural myths and set in capacity perceptive of an unspecified territory, largely bucolic and lyrical. In terms of style due to folk ambience some refer to "neopopulism", others mention also "purismo" and "cubismo". Scholars flag a synthesis of tradition and modernity, the latter represented by innovative if not already extravagant metaphor. Poesía de perfil (1926), published in Paris, offered poems inspecting an interior of the fantastic mixed with a real setting. The largely descriptive tone gave way to dominant lyrical expression and the monothematic perspective was replaced with a variety of themes, often organized around the motive of exploration. "Estética purista" was partially substituted by oneiric and surrealist approach, not clear yet already visible, and the entire volume was distinctively more expressive. La Rosa de los Vientos (1927), published again in Málaga, was a small collection of just 19 poems; they focused upon imaginary journeys to exotic locations and to the inner self. Providing a discourse on space, mystery, and wilderness the volume offered frequent references to ancient as well as popular culture and introduced heterodox erotic motives. Stylistically at times very sophisticated, blending various rhyme orders and syllable types, it is described as a mix of Hispanic Ultra, French surrealism and Chilean creationism.

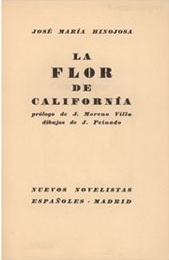
La Flor de California, 1928

Two volumes from 1928 are thought to be the most mature of Hinojosa's works. Orillas de la luz contained mostly poems saturated with eroticism, its main theme. They were, to a large extent, within the surrealist framework, featuring its trademark motives like mutilations and fragmented body parts; the fact that this poetry retained classic metrum is thought to be demonstrative of Hinojosa's synthetic ambitions. La Flor de Californía, considered the first surrealist work in Spain, is his sole prosaic volume; it contains seven dream narratives and seven oneiric texts; the former retain some bizarre linear coherence, while the latter come close to so-called automatic writing. The prose explores typical surrealist imagery: antireligious motives, black humor, objective chance and subterranean dream-worlds, containing also a series of apocalyptic visions. Strictly auto-biographical in terms of perspective, it is viewed as an expression of his own identity in an increasingly desperate pursuit of fulfillment. La Sangre en Libertad (1931) was very much a repetition of La Flor but brought to extremes, with new levels of anti-religious ridicule, sexual references, motives of violence and apocalyptic scenery. Autobiographic features were embroiled in catastrophic premonitions; stylistically the volume shows an evolution towards free verse and far-reaching formal linguistic experiments.

== From Stalinist to Carlist ==
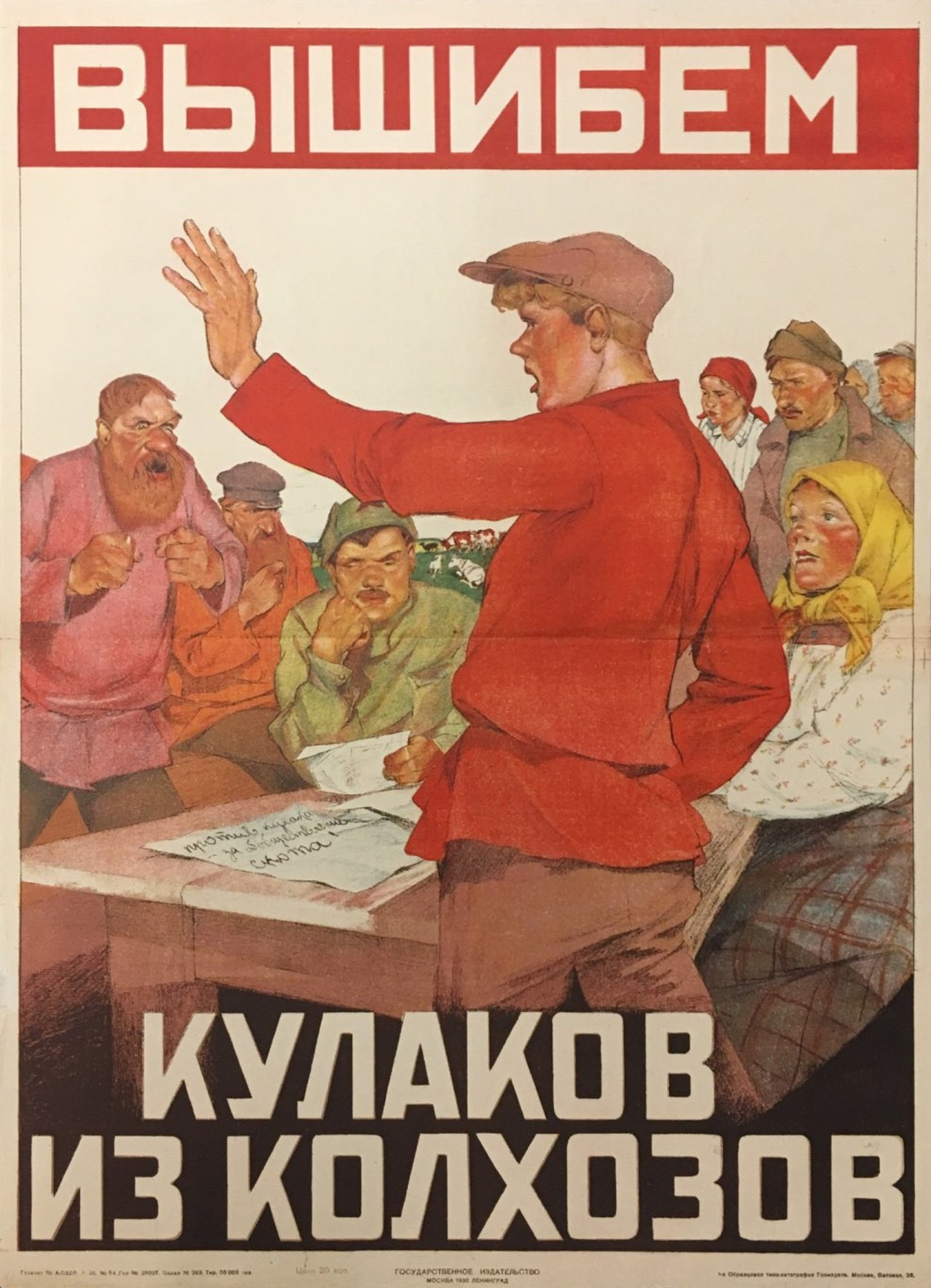
kolkhoz in propaganda

Until the early 1930s Hinojosa did not engage in politics, though his literary stand – especially anti-religious threads, but also social provocations aimed against perceived bourgeoisie mentality – was clearly suggesting left-wing preferences; reportedly he also considered collectivization of family estates and might have visited the USSR to gain familiarity with the Soviet scheme. His later about-face and engagement in right-wing politics remain a mystery and have not been satisfactorily explained. Some scholars speculate that the USSR journey commenced the change. Others note that getting engaged in family business, for decades plagued by rural strikes and social tension, might have also led to his transformation. It is underlined that a love affair with Ana Freüller, apart from being an aviation pioneer a fairly typical wealthy girl who loathed his poetry, might have contributed to this shift in political preference. It is not clear whether the ambiguous stance of Hinojosa's artistic companions convinced him that he belonged to another world and caused him to overreact. Finally, some claimed that his surrealism was merely the caprice of a bourgeoisie señorito, opinion shared also by a few scholars.

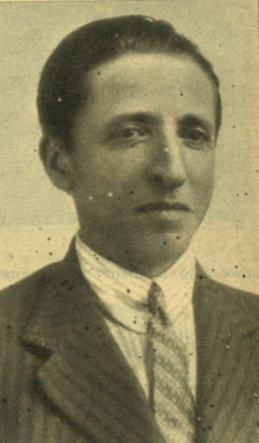
Lamamié de Clairac

Hinojosa's biographers either claim that he started to embrace a right-wing mindset after 1928 or that the rupture took place sometime between 1925 and 1930. He was already highly skeptical – though not militantly averse yet – when the Republic was declared in 1931. In unclear circumstances he assumed the post of juez municipal in Campillos, the job which might have exposed him to cases of social violence. Starting July he was recorded as engaged in the establishment of a provincial landholders’ organization; later that year he became secretary of the newly emergent Federación Provincial de Sindicatos Agrícolas de Málaga and started to write agriculture-centred and conservatism-flavored articles in the local La Unión Mercantil. At that time Hinojosa demonstrated interest in Partido Nacionalista Español of José Albiñana and his former surrealist colleagues agonized that he was about to found a provincial branch of "partido fascista".

Hinojosa finally decided to opt for another right-wing organization. José María Lamamié de Clairac, a landholder and a friend of his father, was at the time combining syndicate activity in agrarian groupings with political engagement in Carlism; it was him who convinced Hinojosa to follow suit. Since January 1932 he was taking part in Comunión Tradicionalista gatherings; in July 1932 he was already recorded delivering a lecture which hailed Catholic virtues of patriotic women, who bravely confronted renegade liberalism, and in early August he organized Carlist meetings in Málaga himself. He resigned the juez municipal post. Gaining recognition in nationwide Traditionalist press Hinojosa was getting identified as a belligerent "derechista” by the authorities; though he had nothing to do with Sanjurjada, in its aftermath he was detained and spent 2 weeks in a local prison, locked up with other Andalusian Carlists genuinely involved in the coup. The experience has only exacerbated his militancy.

== Between Carlism and Agrarism ==
Carlist standard

After his release from jail in late 1932, Hinojosa continued organizing Carlist gatherings across the province. In early 1933, he emerged among the most active Traditionalists in the area together with Arauz de Robles. In March he rose to the jefe of the local organization; in numerous addresses he saluted Carlist heroes, pledged to liberate Spain from a Liberal-Marxist revolution, and paid homage to Sanjurjo, who gallantly sacrificed himself for Spain; some addresses contained thinly veiled anti-Republican tones. In parallel Hinojosa hectically worked to build agrarian syndicates through meetings, speeches, and writings, and as a Carlist representative he animated the Málaga branch of Acción Popular. He represented all 3 groupings standing on broad right-wing alliance ticket during the 1933 electoral campaign; some papers referred to him as a Carlist, some as Agrarian and some as a candidate of AP; scholars name him a Carlist. With 21,662 votes he failed to make it to the Cortes during the inconclusive first round and withdrew shortly before the second one. He commenced the year of 1934 as a freshly appointed member of the board of Editorial Tradicionalista, a new publishing house intended as engine of Carlist propaganda.

From early 1934, there is no more information on Hinojosa's Carlist engagements. Instead, most sources point to his relations with Partido Agrario Español and its syndicates. He kept writing to La Unión Mercantil on average 3 times a month, kept co-administering family estates, and commenced the career of a lawyer. Some sources claim he defended Campillos peasants charged with assault and robbery yet the press noted that he called Guardia Civil against those who occupied his estates, an intervention which resulted in bloody confrontation. In late 1934 the Agrarian minister José María Cid appointed Hinojosa delegado del gobierno en los Servicios Hidráulicos del Sur de España; quoting new political circumstances, he resigned in April 1935, once the Agrarians withdrew from the government. At that time he was already the provincial jefe of Partido Agrario and as its candidate unsuccessfully stood in the 1936 elections.

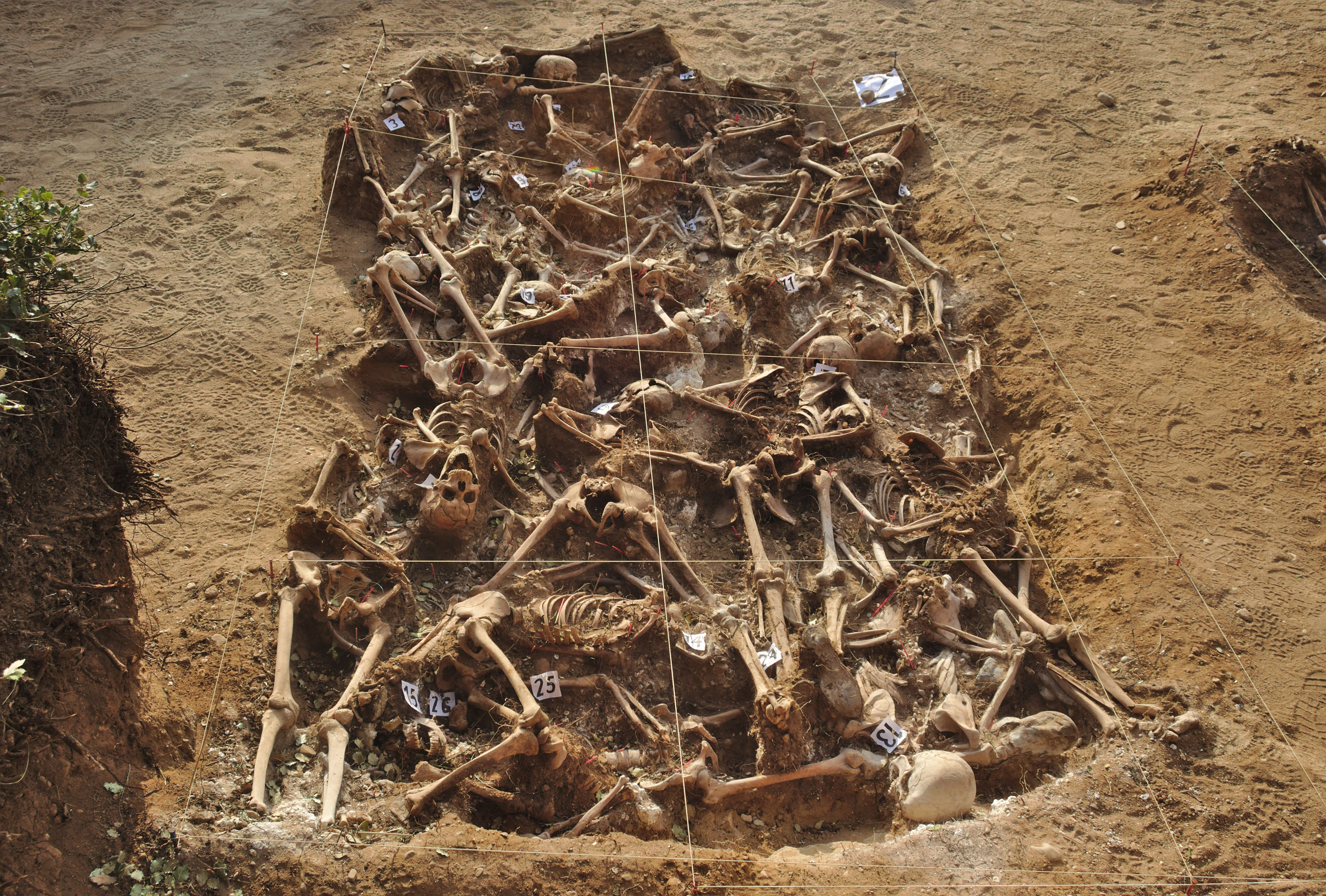
civil war mass grave

Following triumph of Frente Popular Hinojosa was hectically involved in agrarian syndicates, demanding re-introduction of public order and revision of rural labor contracts. In May – still active as a lawyer - he was detained following disturbances in Campillos. During the July 18 coup in Málaga he might have been involved in assisting the military and together with his father and brother went into hiding the following day. They considered an escape to Gibraltar, but before taking action the three were captured on July 24. They spent the next month in provincial prison; on August 22 the workers’ militia stormed the building, dragged 43 prisoners out, shot them at the local cemetery and buried the bodies in the mass grave. Hinojosa's corpse has never been positively identified. Following the Nationalist conquest of Málaga the remnants were exhumed and Salvador Hinojosa was recognized thanks to a handkerchief in his pocket; it was assumed that two mostly decomposed corpses of young males next to his body were these of Francisco and José María.

== Reception and legacy ==
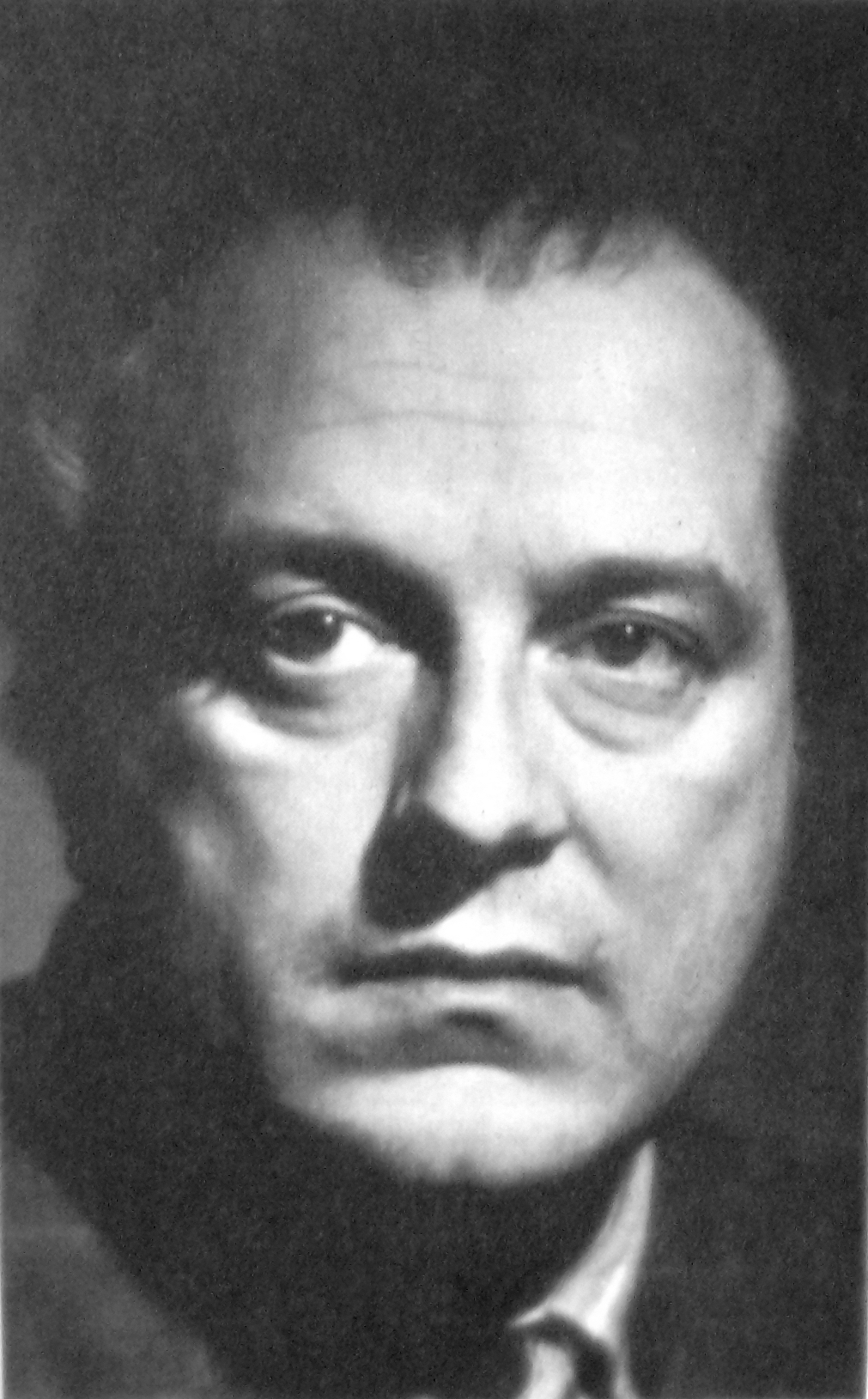
Alberti, 1960s

Hinojosa's writings went unnoticed, save for a limited avant-garde audience. Critics remained mostly indifferent; only few noted "excessive originality". A handful of reviews following the 1928 volumes denigrated the author; some dubbed his poetry "entelequia", others ridiculed "señorito andaluz" and noted that "having two cars does not allow too much". Following his death his works were almost completely forgotten, as to both sides of the war he was an "inconvenient dead". For the Republicans, his life and death made a dangerously symmetrical parallelism to those of Lorca and might have harmed the propaganda exploitation of Lorca's fate as an anti-Francoist cause célèbre. Hinojosa was denied surrealist credentials and patronized; his former companions like Alberti floated stories of a greedy bourgeoisie landowner killed by his own peasants and some denied having known him. For the Nationalists, who consistently denied the existence of Spanish surrealism, his iconoclastic poetry made him ineligible for a Nationalist martyr. The exiled and Spain-based historians of literature alike either ignored Hinojosa or relegated him to footnotes, though very sporadically some poems appeared in anthologies and his name was mentioned in the press a few times.

In 1974, Hinojosa's cousin Baltasar Peña took advantage of his position in the Diputación de Málaga to finance a re-edition of selected works; some press notes followed up noting a "deformación" of contemporary literature yet others insisted not to "desorbitar la importancia". In 1977 Julio Neira launched a campaign to revindicate Hinojosa, crowned with a 1981 PhD dissertation; a 1983 re-edition of 2 volumes of Litoral contributed to the process. In the 1980s Hinojosa was gradually making his way into encyclopedias, periodicals, textbooks etc. and 1995 brought another PhD thesis. Since then his presence in history of literature is considered obligatory, based mostly on his presumed status of the first Spanish surrealist; However, in some cases he is denied membership in Generación del 27. In 1998 he was declared hijo predilecto by Málaga province, the 2004 birth centenary produced several publications and events, and a 2012 study (instead of the typical "forgotten poet") referred already to "a well-known Spanish poet". In 2014 he was dedicated a literary work. A Málaga school has been named after him.

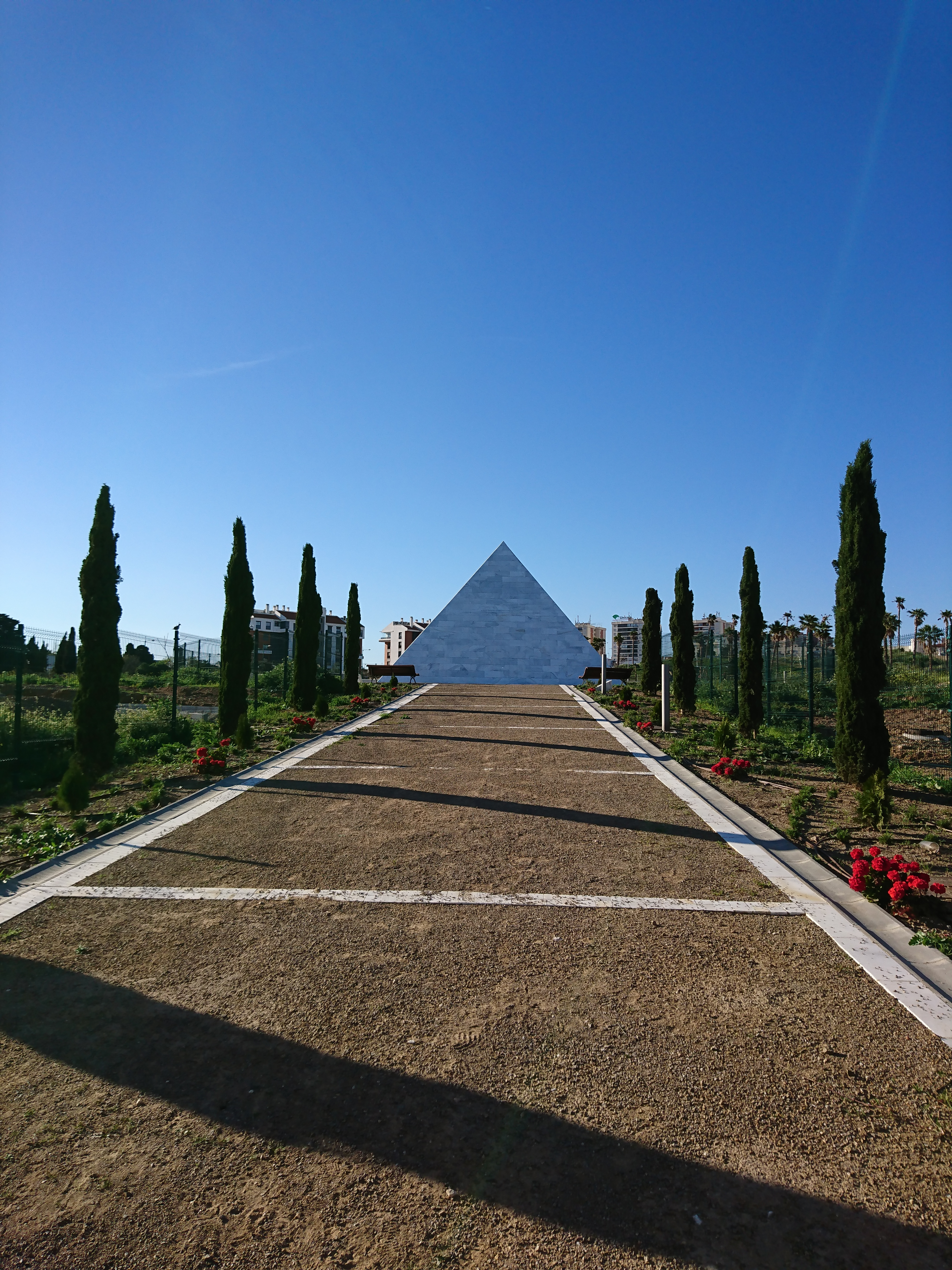
San Rafael, monument to those who died for freedom and democracy

Hinojosa's memory remains politically charged. Some tackle the Hinojosa-Lorca parallelism by declaring that both poets fell victim in differing ways to the "irrational hatred" of an "absurd war", yet among countless books discussing the Spanish Civil War terrors, almost all mention Lorca and almost none mention Hinojosa. Both right-wing and left-wing groups started to claim Hinojosa's legacy. Some Traditionalist sites honor him as "their man", while certain progressive authors present Hinojosa as a martyr who dedicated his life to fighting imperialism, nationalism and the Church; others imply his homosexuality. The Málaga San Rafael cemetery, where Hinojosa was executed, was doted in 2014 with a monument-mausoleum to honor "those who gave their life in defense of freedom and democracy and whose remains rest here or in other sites". Hinojosa has never been mentioned in a spate of press notes related, some of which noted a construction recording "la barbarie de la represión franquista".

== See also ==
- Surrealism
- Carlism
- Spanish Agrarian Party
