= Campillos =

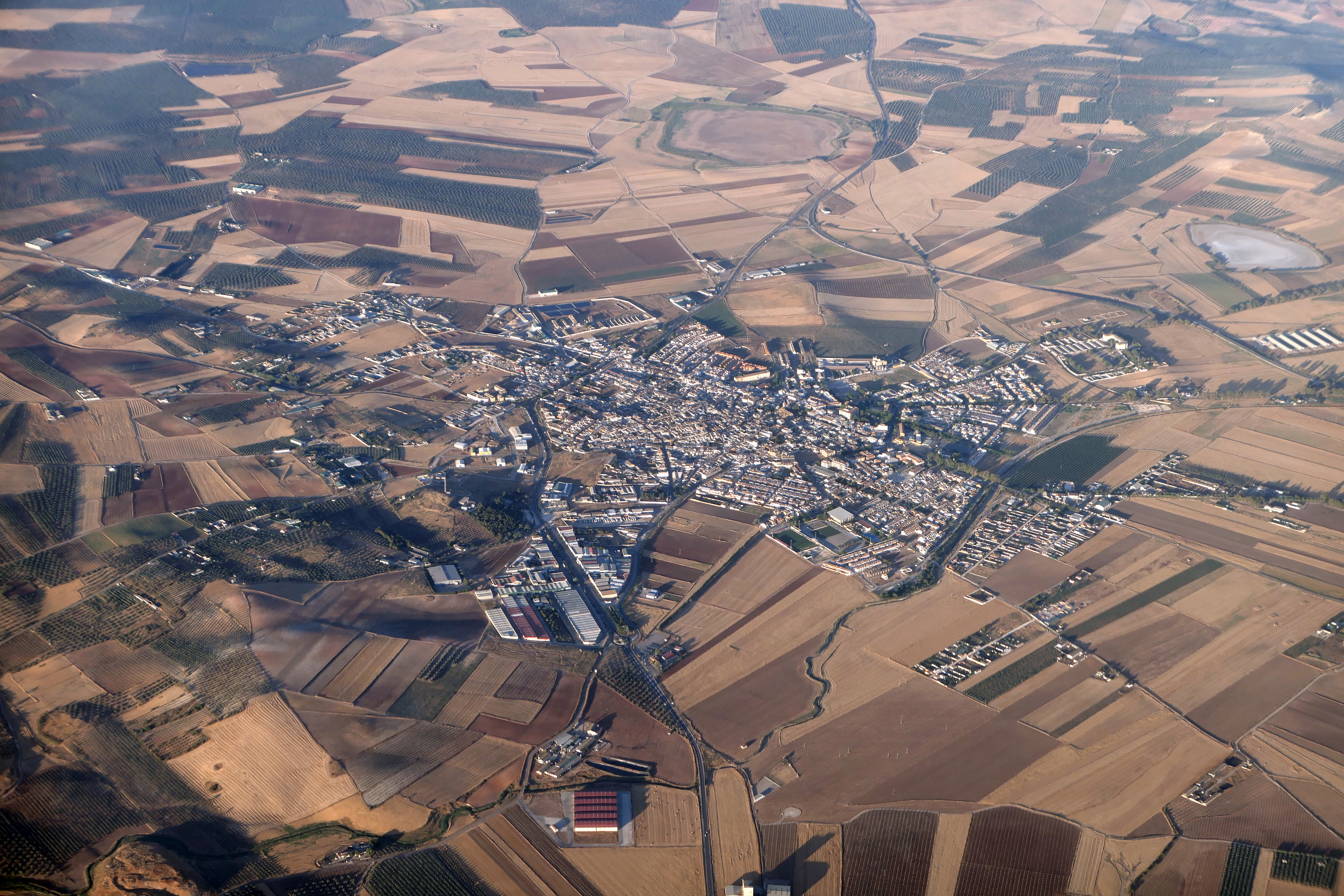

- Flag Coat of arms

- Location in Andalusia
- Coordinates: 37°03′N 4°51′W
- Sovereign state: Spain
- Autonomous community: Andalusia
- Province: Málaga
- Comarca: Antequera

Government
  - IU: Francisco Guerrero Cuadrado

Area
  - Total: 188 km^{2} (73 sq mi)
- Elevation: 461 m (1,512 ft)

Population (2025-01-01)
  - Total: 8,561
  - Density: 45.5/km^{2} (118/sq mi)
- Demonym: Campillero
- Time zone: UTC+1 (CET)
  - Summer (DST): UTC+2 (CEST)
- Postal code: 29320
- Website: http://www.campillos.es

Campillos is a municipality and town in the province of Málaga, part of the autonomous community of Andalusia in southern Spain. It is located northwest of the province in the comarca of Guadalteba and within the judicial district of Antequera. The municipality is approximately 30 kilometers from Antequera and 70 from the provincial capital. It covers an area of 188 km^{2} extending from grain fields and olive groves and includes several lakes inhabited by flamingos and storks.

It has a population of approximately 8,633 residents according to the National Institute of Statistics (2012). The parish church Our Lady of Repose, Iglesia Parroquial Nuestra Señora del Reposo, near the plaza is a major attraction. The natives are called Campilleros.

Campillos was founded in 1492.

It is home to the Campillos International Piano Competition, first held in 2007.

== Geography ==
Campillos is part of the comarca of Guadalteba, together with the municipalities of Almargen, Ardales, Cañete La Real, Carratraca, Cuevas del Becerro, Sierra de Yeguas and Teba.

It includes the old municipality of Peñarrubia, which disappeared in the 1970s due to the construction of the reservoir of Guadalteba.

=== Flora and fauna ===
Most of the land is covered by olive groves and grain fields on its flat side and the mountains are dominated by scrub and woodland.

== See also ==
- List of municipalities in Málaga
