= Comarca de Antequera =

Coordinates: 37°04′47″N 4°37′25″W

- Comarca
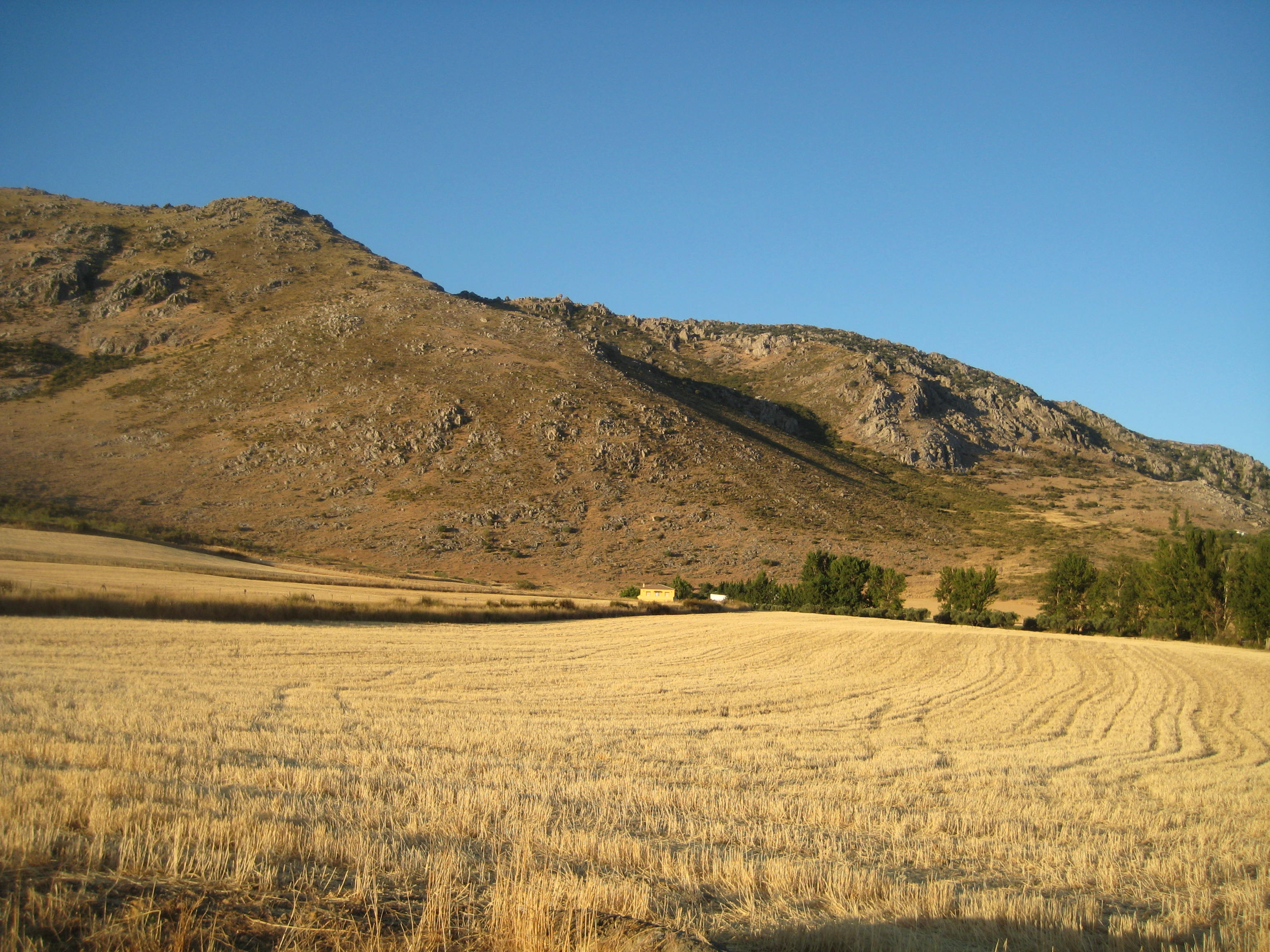
- Countryside in the Comarca de Antequera.

- Location of Comarca de Antequera in Andalusia, Spain

- Location of Comarca de Antequere in the province of Málaga
- Country: Spain
- Autonomous community: Andalusia
- Province: Málaga
- Capital: Antequera
- Municipalities: List: Alameda, Antequera, Casabermeja, Fuente de Piedra, Humilladero, Mollina, Sierra de Yeguas, Villanueva de la Concepción

Area
  - Total: 1,234.6 km^{2} (476.7 sq mi)

Population (2023) (Note: Estimate at 1 January 2023: National Statistics Institute (Spain).)
  - Total: 68,857
  - Density: 55.773/km^{2} (144.45/sq mi)
- Time zone: UTC+1 (CET)
  - Summer (DST): UTC+2 (CEST)

The Comarca de Antequera is one of the nine comarcas (currently with no administrative role) in the province of Málaga, in Andalusia, southern Spain.

It is located in the area of the Surco Intrabético range, on the boundary with the province of Córdoba. The landscape is largely plain (Hoya de Antequera), run by the higher valley of the Guadalhorce river.

The present-day comarca was established in 2003 by the Government of Andalusia.

== Municipalities ==
The comarca originally included seven municipalities, a further municipality, Villanueva de la Concepción, was created by separation from Antequera municipality on 17 March 2009:

Arms	Municipality	Area (km^{2})	Population (2023) (Note: Estimate at 1 January 2023: National Statistics Institute (Spain))	Density (/km^{2})
	Alameda	65.1	5,434	83.5
	Antequera	749.3	41,178	0.1
	Casabermeja	67.3	3,910	58.1
	Fuente de Piedra	90.6	2,891	31.9
	Humilladero	34.7	3,311	95.4
	Mollina	74.6	5,413	72.56
	Sierra de Yeguas	85.6	3,418	39.9
	Villanueva de la Concepción +	67.4	3,302	49
	Totals	1,234.6	68,857	55.77

+ a new municipality, created in 2009 from part of Antequera municipality.
