= Cartaojal =

Town in Spain

- Village
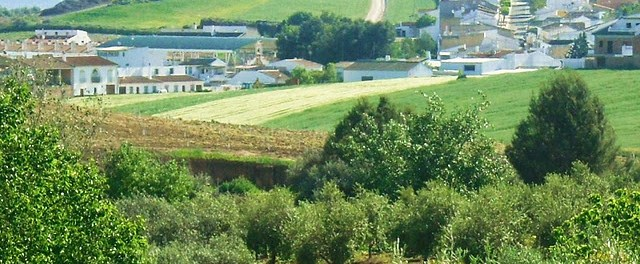
- View of Cartaojal

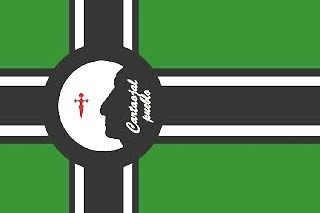
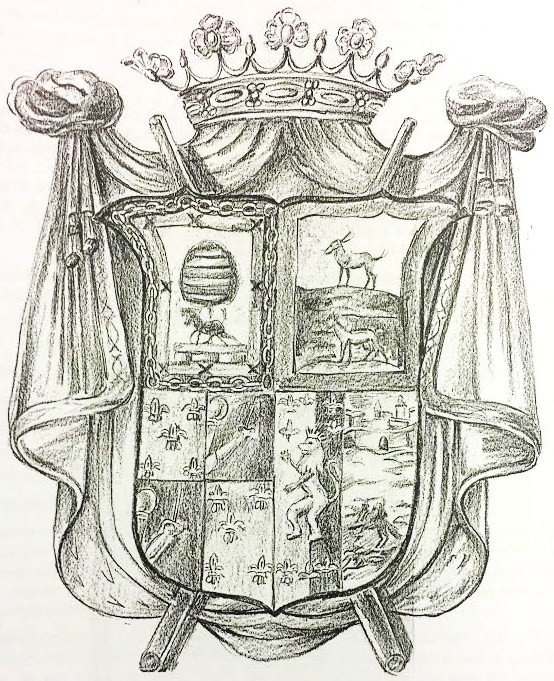
- Flag Seal

- Location within Province of Málaga Location within Spain
- Coordinates: 37°06′30″N 04°30′45″W
- Country: Spain
- Autonomous community: Andalusia
- Province: Málaga
- Municipality: Antequera

Government
  - Mayor: José A. Campos
- Elevation: 537 m (1,762 ft)

Population (2022)
  - Total: 1,199
- Time zone: UTC+1 (CET)
  - Summer (DST): UTC+2 (CEST)
- Postal code: 29250

Cartaojal is a village in Antequera, Málaga, Andalusia, Spain. According to the 2022 census, the village has an estimated population of about 1,199.

== Geography ==
Cartaojal is located at the eastern edge of Antequera. It shares border with Cañadas de Pareja to the north, Archidona to the east, Los Llanos to the south, and Mollina to the west. The village has an average elevation of 537 meters above the sea level.

== Demographics ==
According to the Instituto Nacional de Estadística, as of 2022 Cartaojal has a total population of 1,199, out of which 599 are male inhabitants and 600 are female inhabitants.

== Galleries ==
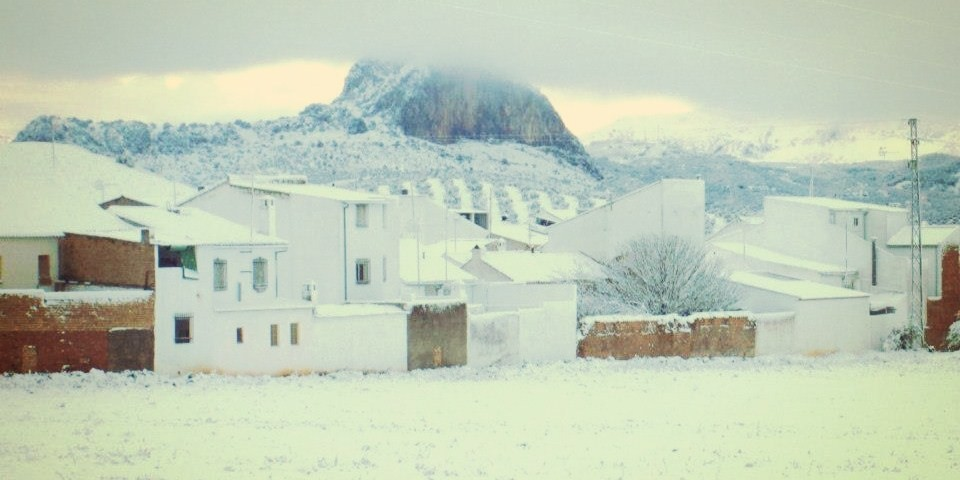
Snow day on February 28, 2013

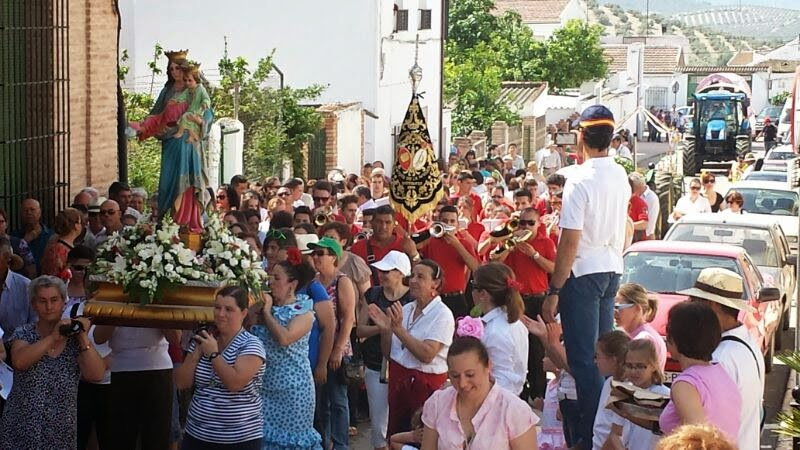
Romería de Cartaojal Festival

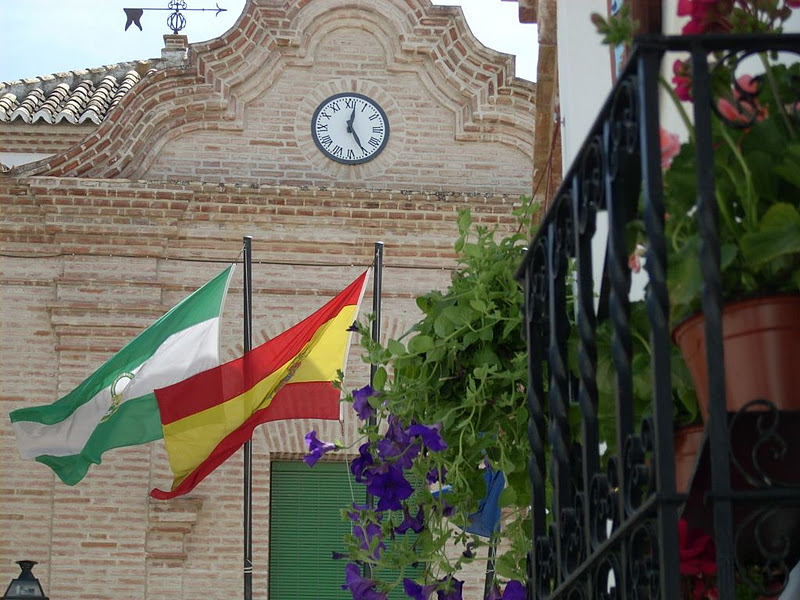
Multi-use public building in Cartaojal

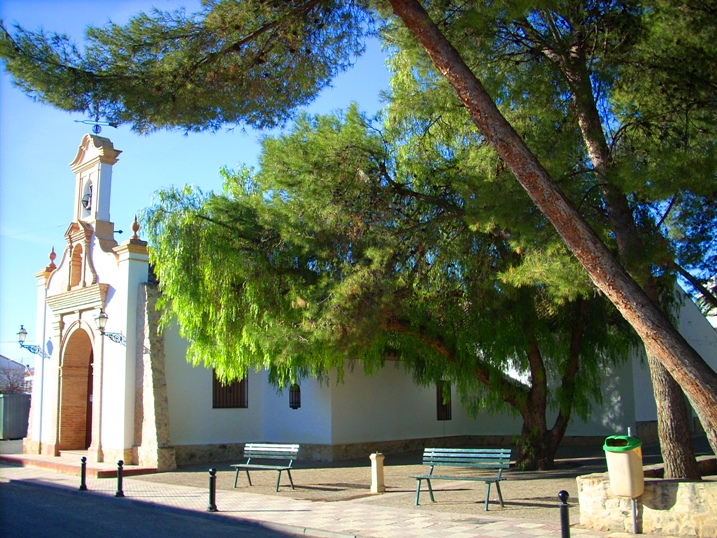
Local church

== See also ==
- Antequera
- Peña de los Enamorados
