= Francisco Duran =

Francisco Duran may refer to:

- Francisco Manuel Durán (born 1988), Spanish footballer
- Francisco Martin Duran (born 1968), who attempted to assassinate Bill Clinton
- Francisco Durán (weightlifter) (born 1984), Dominican Republic weightlifter
- Francisco González Durán Fuentes Galindo (born 1987), Mexican footballer
