= Almargen =

- Municipality
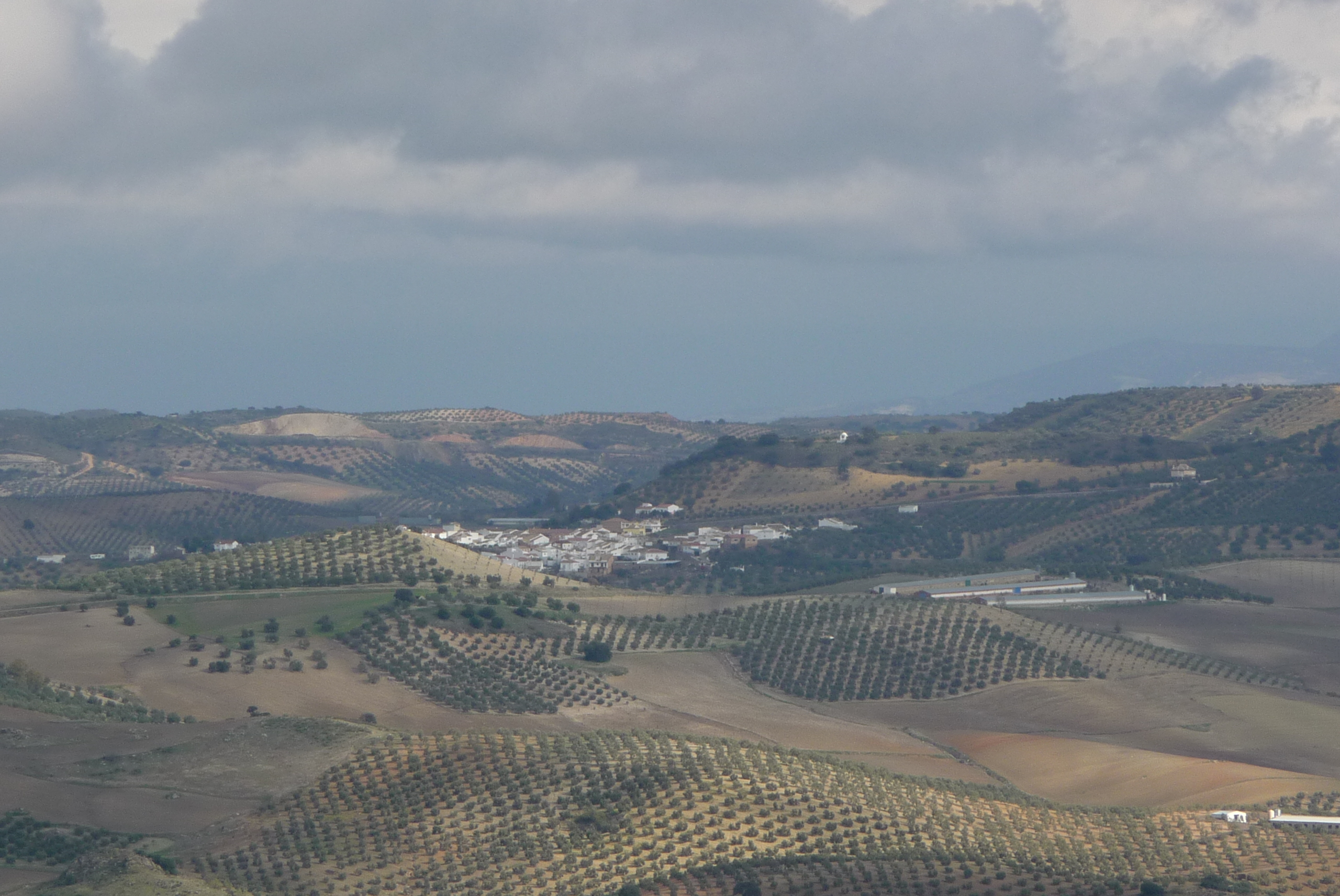

- Flag Coat of arms

- Municipal location in the Province of Málaga

- Location in Spain Almargen (Andalusia) Almargen (Spain)
- Coordinates: 37°00′N 5°01′W
- Sovereign state: Spain
- Autonomous community: Andalusia
- Province: Málaga
- Comarca: Comarca of Antequera

Area
  - Total: 165 km^{2} (64 sq mi)
- Elevation: 733 m (2,405 ft)

Population (2025-01-01)
  - Total: 1,876
  - Density: 11.4/km^{2} (29.4/sq mi)
- Demonym: Almargeños
- Time zone: UTC+1 (CET)
  - Summer (DST): UTC+2 (CEST)
- Website: www.almargen.es

Almargen is a town and municipality in the province of Málaga, part of the autonomous community of Andalusia in southern Spain. The municipality is situated approximately 105 kilometers from the capital, Málaga. It is 43.7 km from Ronda and 48.2 km from Antequera. It has a population of approximately 2,100 residents. The natives are called Almargeños.

Almargen is one of the most northwestern towns in the province. It borders the provinces of Seville and Cadiz. It is part of the comarca of Guadalteba, together with the municipalities of Ardales, Campillos, Cañete la Real, Carratraca, Cuevas del Becerro, Sierra de Mares and Teba.

Almargen has a population of 2,136 inhabitants (INE, 2008). Its inhabitants are predominantly engaged in agriculture and livestock, with large herds of swine being important.

== Geography ==
Almargen has a landscape border between Serranía de Ronda, the Málaga plain to the north and the countrysides of Seville and Cádiz. It has a rugged terrain towards the mountainous landscape of Cañete la Real, where the road takes advantage of the narrow valley of the Cañada de la Saucedilla and rises until the towns at the gates of the Serranía. A landscape that contrasts sharply with that of the agricultural plain that stretches around the village of olive groves, corn and sunflower. Beyond the plain landscape it has small rounded hills, which marks the roof of the town more than a hundred feet above the urban center (510 m), in the hills of Salguera (620 m), Galán (612 m) and La Grana (649 m). The latter at the edges of the municipality.

== Toponymy ==
The name Almargen is of Arabic origin.

== See also ==
- List of municipalities in Málaga
