= Alcazaba of Antequera =

Fortress in Antequera, Spain

Coordinates: 37.0141°N 4.5577°W

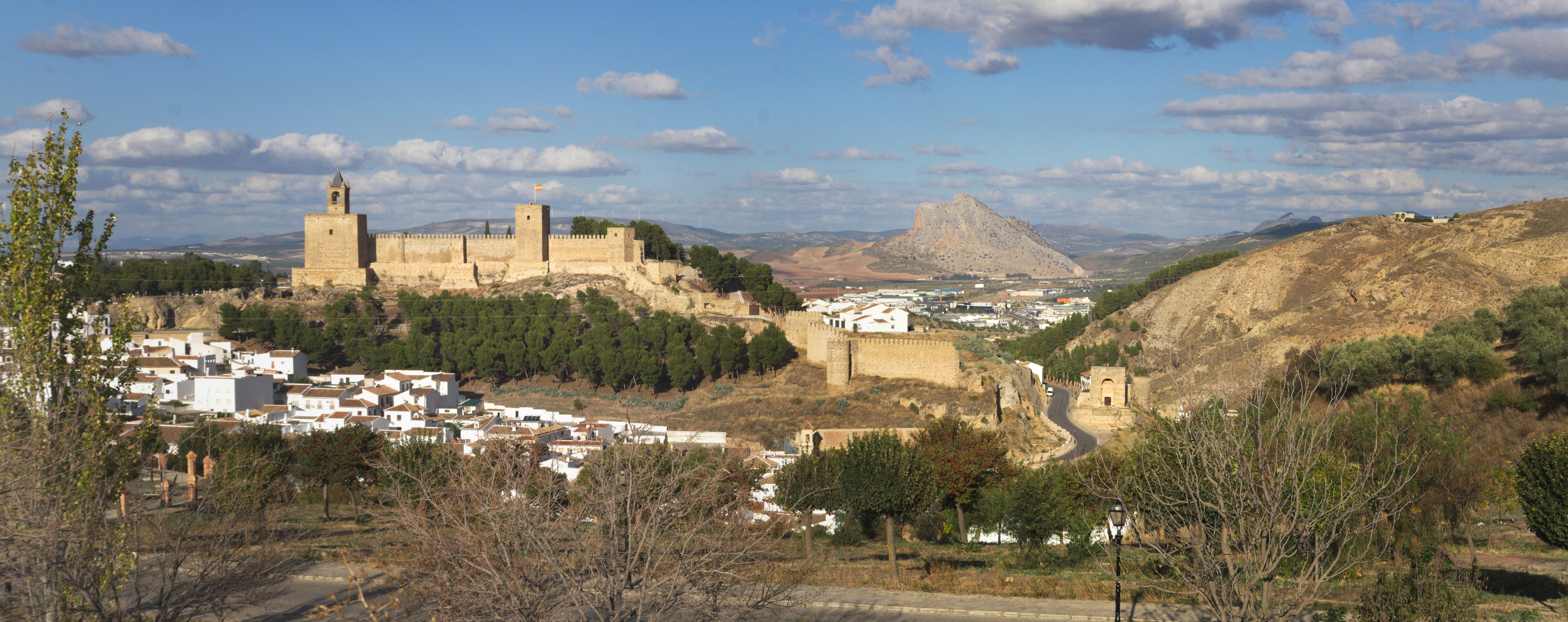
View of the Alcazaba

The Alcazaba of Antequera is a Moorish fortress in Antequera, Spain. It was erected over Roman ruins in the 14th century to counter the Christian advance from the north.

Courtyard of the Alcazaba

The fortress is rectangular in shape, with two towers. Its keep (Spanish: Torre del homenaje, 15th century) is considered amongst the largest of al-Andalus, with the exception of the Comares Tower of the Alhambra. It is surmounted by a Catholic bell tower/chapel (Templete del Papabellotas) added in 1582.

Connected to the former by a line of walls is the Torre Blanca ("white tower").

== Terminology ==
The term alcazaba, used for Moorish fortifications in Portugal and Spain, comes from the Arabic casbah, usually used for similar structures in North Africa.
