= Humilladero =

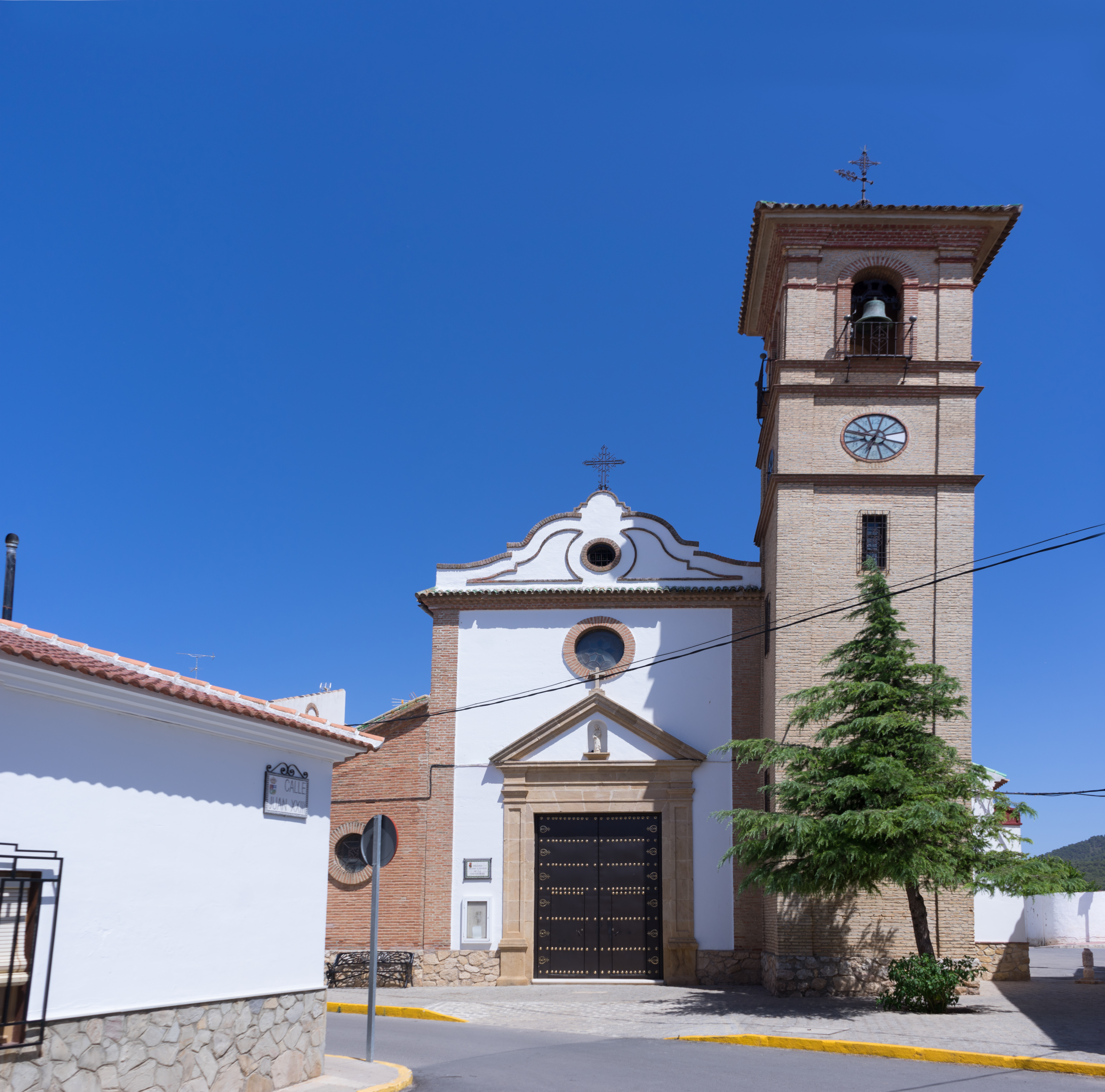
- Parish church of Humilladero

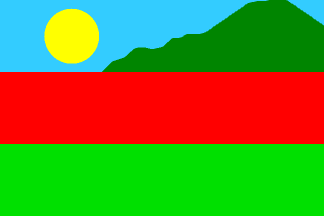
- Flag Coat of arms

- Location within Province of Málaga Location within Andalusia Location within Spain
- Coordinates: 37°06′53″N 4°42′10″W
- Country: Spain
- Autonomous community: Andalusia
- Province: Málaga
- Comarca: Antequera

Government
  - Mayor: Félix Doblas Sanzo

Area
  - Total: 35 km^{2} (14 sq mi)
- Elevation: 454 m (1,490 ft)

Population (2025-01-01)
  - Total: 3,373
  - Density: 96/km^{2} (250/sq mi)
- Demonym: Humilladerenses
- Website: www.humilladero.org

Humilladero is a town and municipality in the province of Málaga, part of the autonomous community of Andalusia in southern Spain. It is located in the comarca of Antequera. The municipality is situated on the border with the province of Seville and 78 kilometers from the city of Málaga and 528 km from Madrid. It has a population of approximately 3,300 residents.

== See also ==
- List of municipalities in Málaga
