= Francis Durán =

Spanish footballer

Personal information
- Full name: Francisco Manuel Durán Vázquez
- Date of birth: 28 April 1988 (age 38)
- Place of birth: Almargen, Spain
- Height: 1.82 m (5 ft 11 1/2 in)
- Position: Midfielder

Youth career
- 2000–2005: Mortadelo
- 2005–2007: Málaga

Senior career*
| Years | Team | Apps | (Gls) |
| 2006–2007 | Málaga B | 3 | (0) |
| 2007 | Málaga | 1 | (0) |
| 2007–2010 | Liverpool | 0 | (0) |
| 2011–2012 | Elche | 0 | (0) |
| 2011–2012 | → Orihuela (loan) | 23 | (1) |
| 2012–2013 | Orihuela | 23 | (0) |
| 2013 | Écija | 7 | (0) |
| 2014 | Alcalá | 0 | (0) |
| Total | | 57 | (1) |

International career
| 2007 | Spain U19 | 2 | (0) |
- * Club domestic league appearances and goals

Francisco 'Francis' Manuel Durán Vázquez (born 28 April 1988) is a Spanish former footballer who played as a midfielder.

His career, during which he represented Málaga and Liverpool, was greatly hampered by injuries.

== Club career ==
Born in Almargen, Province of Málaga, Durán joined hometown's Málaga CF in 2005, finishing his football formation there. In 2007, he made his senior debuts by appearing for both the second and first teams, featuring in two official games for the latter as a starter (one in Segunda División and another in the Copa del Rey).

On 31 January 2007, Durán was purchased by Liverpool in England. After a nine-month injury layoff, he made a 76th-minute substitute appearance in the mini-derby against Everton. However, he suffered another injury to his anterior cruciate ligament later that month, in a match against Tottenham Hotspur also for the reserves.

In September 2007, Durán returned to action with the B-side against Port Vale, claiming one assist in a 4–1 win. He was released by Liverpool in July 2010, without any first-team appearances to his credit.

In mid-August 2011, after one year out of football, Durán returned to his country and signed for Elche CF, being immediately loaned to Valencian neighbours Orihuela CF, in Segunda División B. He appeared in roughly half of the league games during his spell, as the team finished in second position albeit without promotion.

On 7 August 2012, Durán was due to return to top-league football by signing with FK Jagodina in Serbia. However, nothing came of it and he continued with his previous club, joining on a permanent basis.

In the summer of 2013, Durán joined another side in Segunda División B, Écija Balompié. He was released before the end of the year, and eventually retired at the end of only 26.
