= Villanueva de la Concepción =

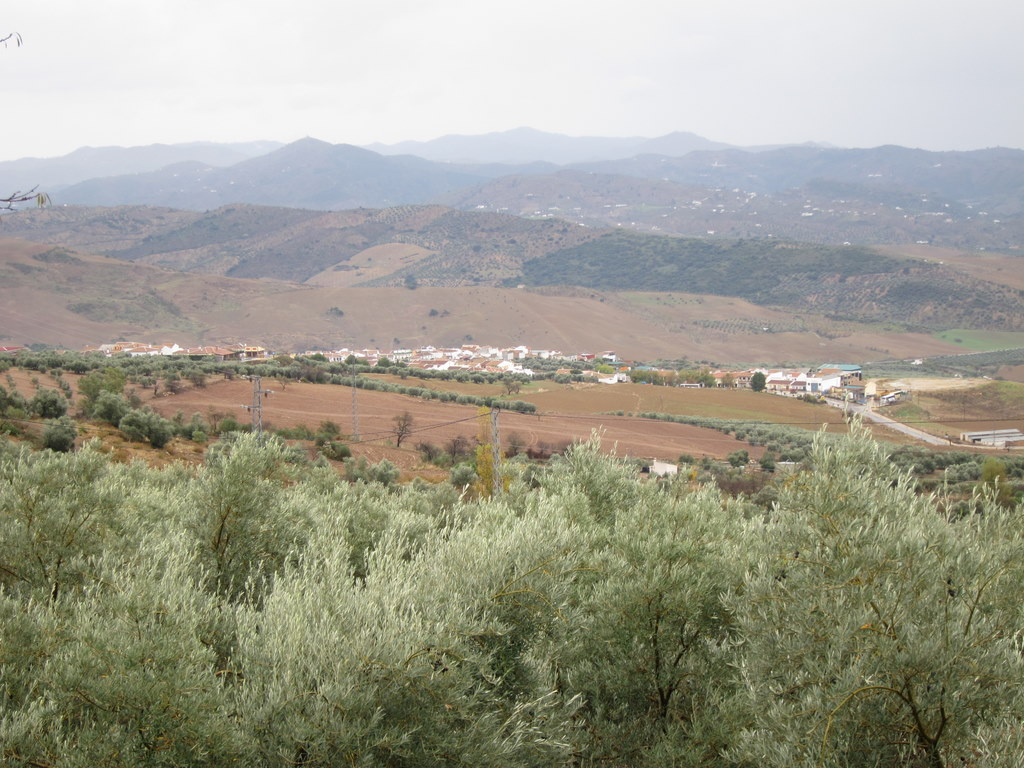

- Flag Coat of arms

- Location in Andalusia Villanueva de la Concepción (Andalusia) Villanueva de la Concepción (Spain)
- Coordinates: 36°55′52″N 4°31′54″W
- Sovereign state: Spain
- Autonomous community: Andalusia
- Province: Málaga
- Comarca: Comarca de Antequera

Government
  - Mayor: Gonzalo Sánchez Hoyos

Area
  - Total: 67.37 km^{2} (26.01 sq mi)
- Elevation: 534 m (1,752 ft)

Population (2025-01-01)
  - Total: 3,296
  - Density: 48.92/km^{2} (126.7/sq mi)
- Demonym: Villanovenses
- Time zone: UTC+1 (CET)
  - Summer (DST): UTC+2 (CEST)
- Postcode: 29230
- Website: Official website

Villanueva de la Concepción is a town and municipality in the province of Málaga, part of the autonomous community of Andalucía in southern Spain. The municipality is situated approximately 35 kilometres from the provincial capital of Málaga. It is located at the foot of El Torcal. It has an altitude between 400 and 500 metres. It is known as the more romantic village at Spain. This is because its Hall has promoted several actions such as including several romantic messages in the streets of this village.

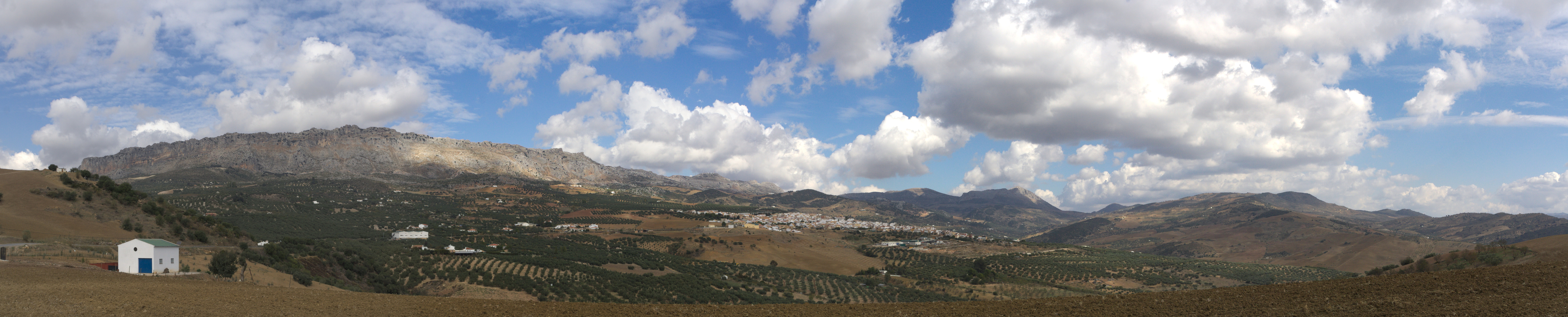
View on Villanueva de la Concepción with El Torcal Massif in the background

== See also ==
- List of municipalities in Málaga
