= Mollina =

Mollina: Mollina (Spanish)
- Municipality
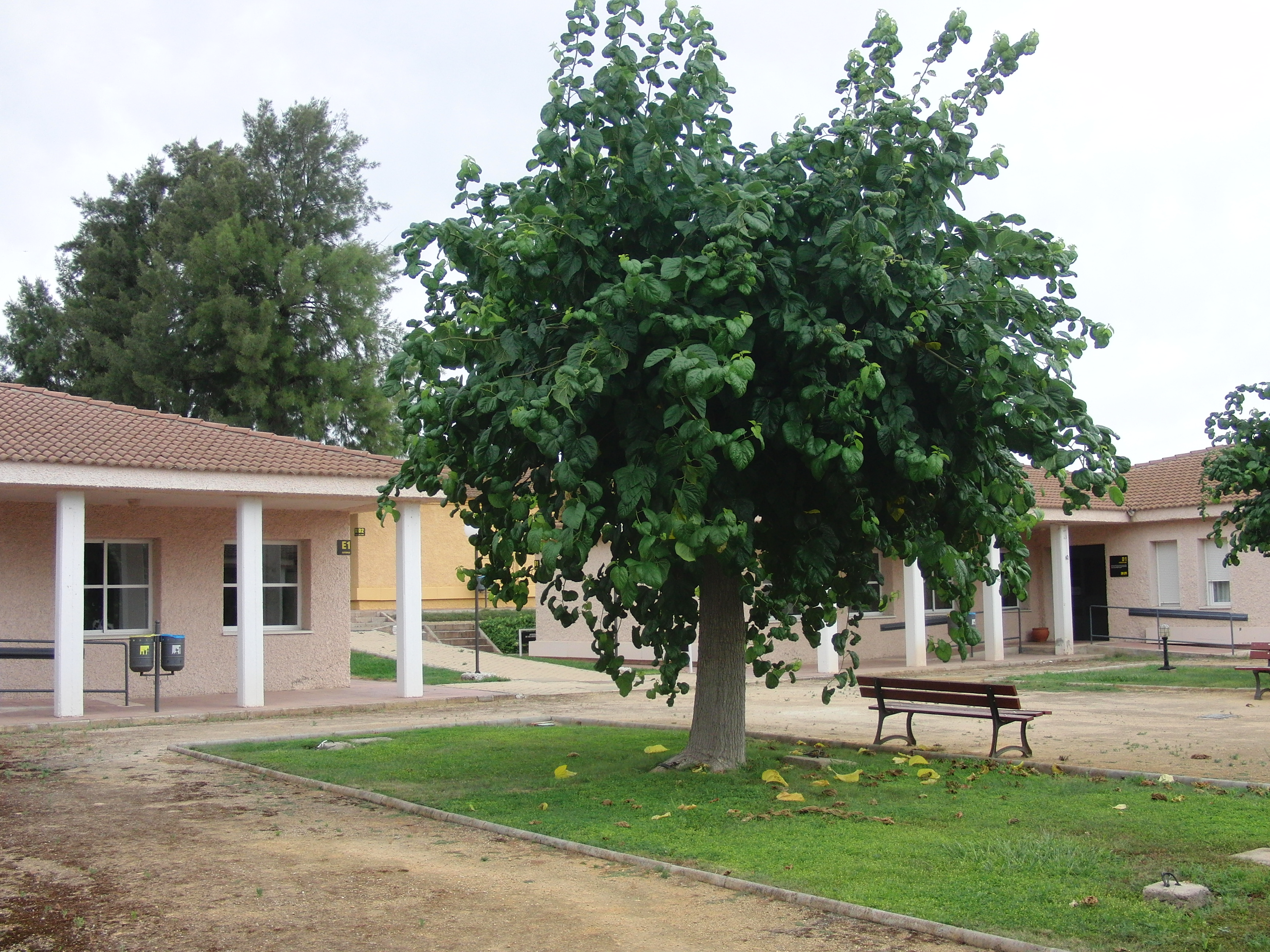

- Flag Coat of arms

- Location within Province of Málaga Location within Andalusia Location within Spain
- Coordinates: 37°07′23″N 4°39′22″W
- Sovereign state: Spain
- Autonomous community: Andalusia
- Province: Málaga
- Comarca: Comarca de Antequera
- Municipality: Mollina

Government
  - Mayor: Eugenio Sevillano Ordóñez (PSOE-Andalusia)

Area
  - Total: 75 km^{2} (29 sq mi)
- Elevation: 473 m (1,552 ft)

Population (2025-01-01)
  - Total: 5,528
  - Density: 74/km^{2} (190/sq mi)
- Demonym(s): mollinato, -na
- Patron saint: Virgen de la Oliva (August 15)
- Website: www.mollina.es

Mollina is the premier wine and olive oil producing town in the province of Málaga, part of the autonomous community of Andalusia in southern Spain. Mollina produces up to 90% of all Málaga denominacion wine and features the award winning wine brand Bodega La Fuente, run by the Navarro family and based in the historical "Fuente de Mollina" area. The town of Mollina was once home to the Counts of Mollina.

== Location ==
The municipality is situated approximately 16 kilometres from Antequera and 60 km north of the provincial capital of Málaga on the coast. The people are known as Mollinatos. It has a population of approximately 5,000 residents.

== Festivals ==
Mollina celebrates five festivals a year, the Candelaria or festividad de la Virgen de la Candelaria on February 1; Semana Santa, aka Easter, in late March or early April;the Romeriá on the second weekend of May; and the Feria de Agosto in August; the cultural and harvest themed Feria de la Vendimia on the second weekend of September.

== Population ==
As of 2018, there are 5,020 inhabitants in the town of Mollina. There is an expat British population in Mollina, living either in the town or on one of three mobile park home sites, the largest being at the Hotel Molino de Saydo, where every Wednesday morning there is an "English" market.

== See also ==
- List of municipalities in Málaga
