= Ardales =

- Municipality
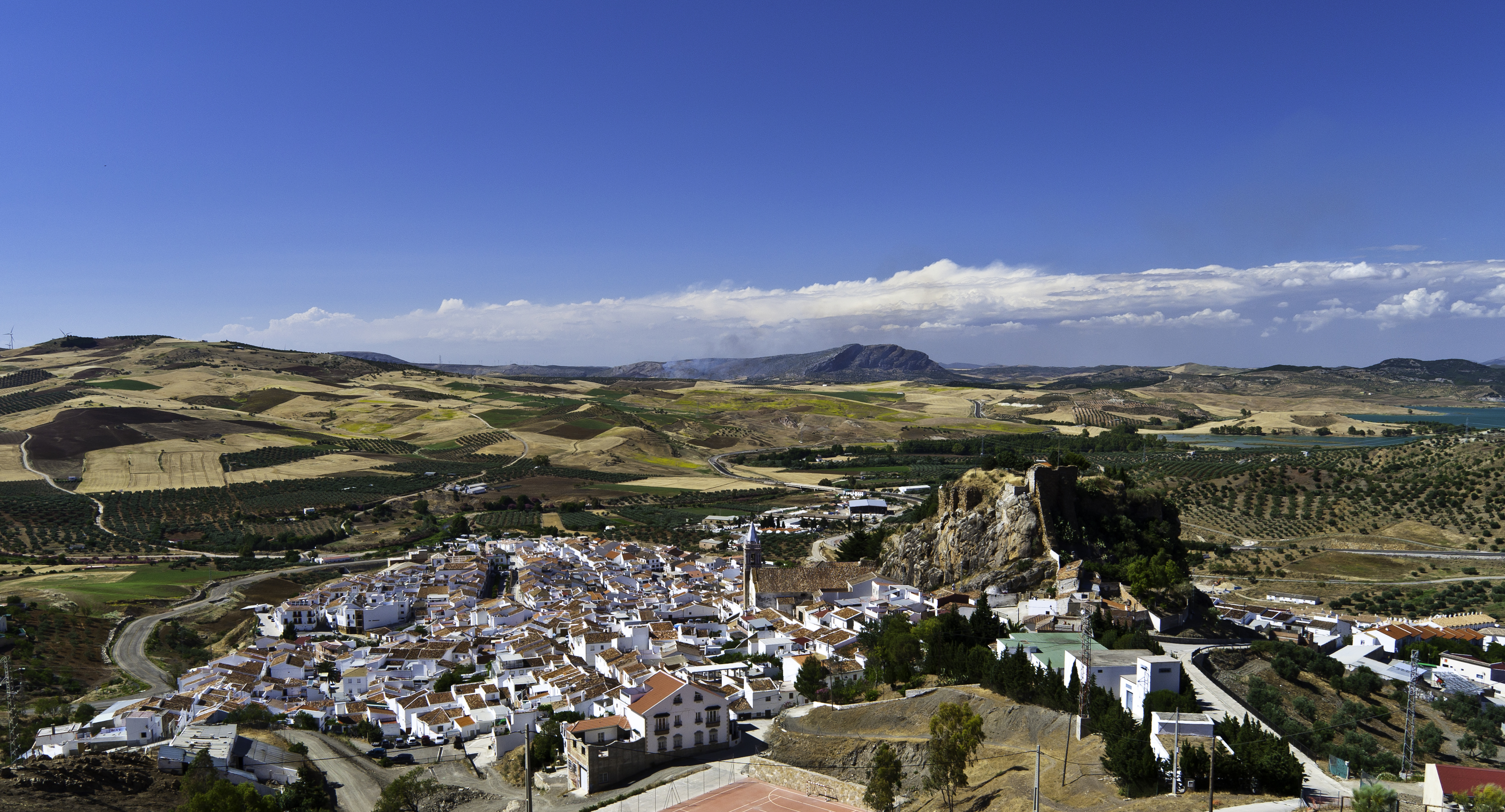

- Flag Coat of arms

- Municipal location in the Province of Málaga

- Location in Spain
- Coordinates: 36°52′40″N 4°50′41″W
- Sovereign state: Spain
- Autonomous community: Andalusia
- Province: Málaga
- Comarca: Comarca de Antequera, Guadalteba

Government
  - Mayor: Juan Calderón Ramos

Area
  - Total: 106 km^{2} (41 sq mi)
- Elevation: 445 m (1,460 ft)

Population (2025-01-01)
  - Total: 2,524
  - Density: 23.8/km^{2} (61.7/sq mi)
- Demonym: Ardaleños
- Time zone: UTC+1 (CET)
  - Summer (DST): UTC+2 (CEST)
- Postal code: 29550
- Website: Official website

Ardales is a town and municipality in the Province of Málaga, part of the autonomous community of Andalusia in southern Spain. The municipality is approximately 62.5 kilometres from Málaga.

On the hill above the town is the historic church and higher still are the ruins of the Ardales Castle. At the peak of the hill is the hermitage Ermita del Calvario. The infamous Caminito del Rey is nearby.

It has been claimed that the Cave of Ardales (cueva de doña Trinidad Grund) contains pigments deposited by Middle Paleolithic Neanderthals some 64,800 years ago. This dating, and the possibility of Neanderthal cave art, is disputed on the physical-chemical evidence.

== See also ==
- List of municipalities in Málaga
