= Sierra de Yeguas =

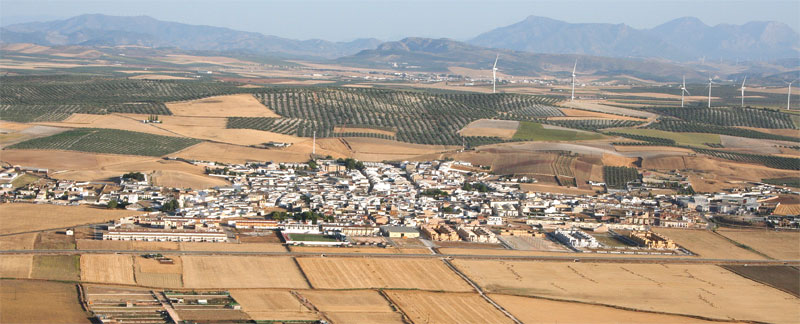

- Flag Coat of arms

- Location within Spain
- Coordinates: 37°07′N 4°52′W
- Sovereign state: Spain
- Autonomous community: Andalusia
- Province: Málaga
- Comarca: Antequera

Government
  - Mayor: Salvador Ortiz

Area
  - Total: 85.6 km^{2} (33.1 sq mi)
- Elevation: 454 m (1,490 ft)

Population (2025-01-01)
  - Total: 3,418
  - Density: 39.9/km^{2} (103/sq mi)
- Demonym: Serranos
- Time zone: UTC+1 (CET)
  - Summer (DST): UTC+2 (CEST)
- Website: Official website

Sierra de Yeguas is a town and municipality in the province of Málaga, part of the autonomous community of Andalusia in southern Spain. It belongs to the comarca of Antequera. The municipality is situated approximately 95 kilometres from the provincial capital of Málaga. It had a population of 3,356 residents in 2018.

== See also ==
- List of municipalities in Málaga
