= Fuente de Piedra =

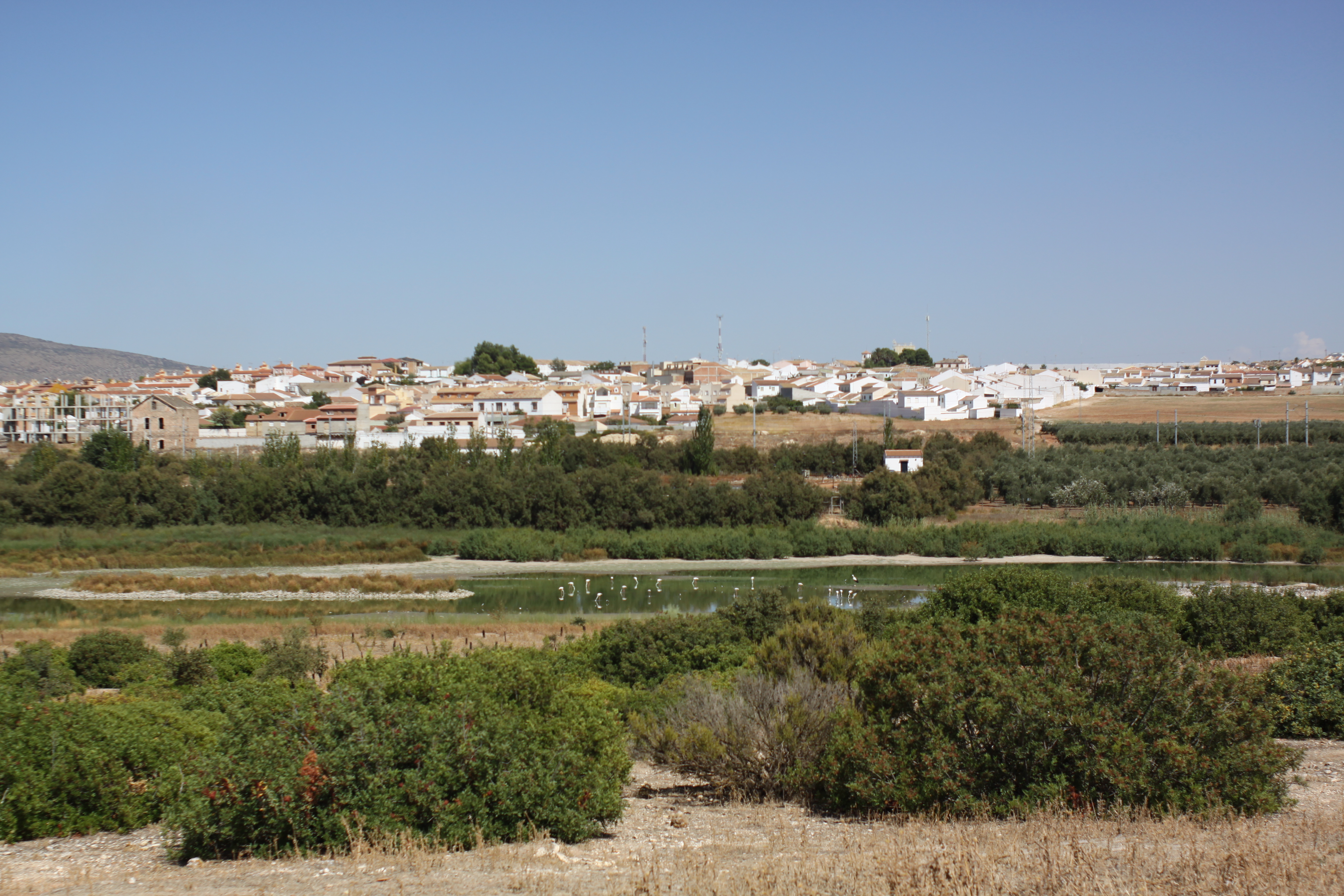
- A view of the city

- Flag Coat of arms

- Location in Spain. Fuente de Piedra (Andalusia) Fuente de Piedra (Spain)
- Coordinates: 37°08′N 4°44′W
- Country: Spain
- Autonomous community: Andalusia
- Province: Málaga

Government
  - Mayor: Siro Pachón

Area
  - Total: 91 km^{2} (35 sq mi)
- Elevation: 459 m (1,506 ft)

Population (2025-01-01)
  - Total: 3,045
  - Density: 33/km^{2} (87/sq mi)
- Demonym(s): Villafontenses, Fontepedreños
- Time zone: UTC+1 (CET)
  - Summer (DST): UTC+2 (CEST)
- Website: Official website

Fuente de Piedra is a town and municipality in the province of Málaga, part of the autonomous community of Andalusia in southern Spain. The municipality is located approximately 19 kilometers from Antequera and 73 km from the provincial capital of Málaga. It is located within the Antequera judicial district as well.

The small town is based in a dry basin amongst the Southern Spanish mountains and is best known for the local Laguna de Fuente de Piedra, home to one of the largest populations of flamingoes in Europe. This is represented in the town by the summer celebration of the festival of ringing the Flamingo.

== See also ==
- List of municipalities in Málaga
