= Casabermeja =

- Municipality
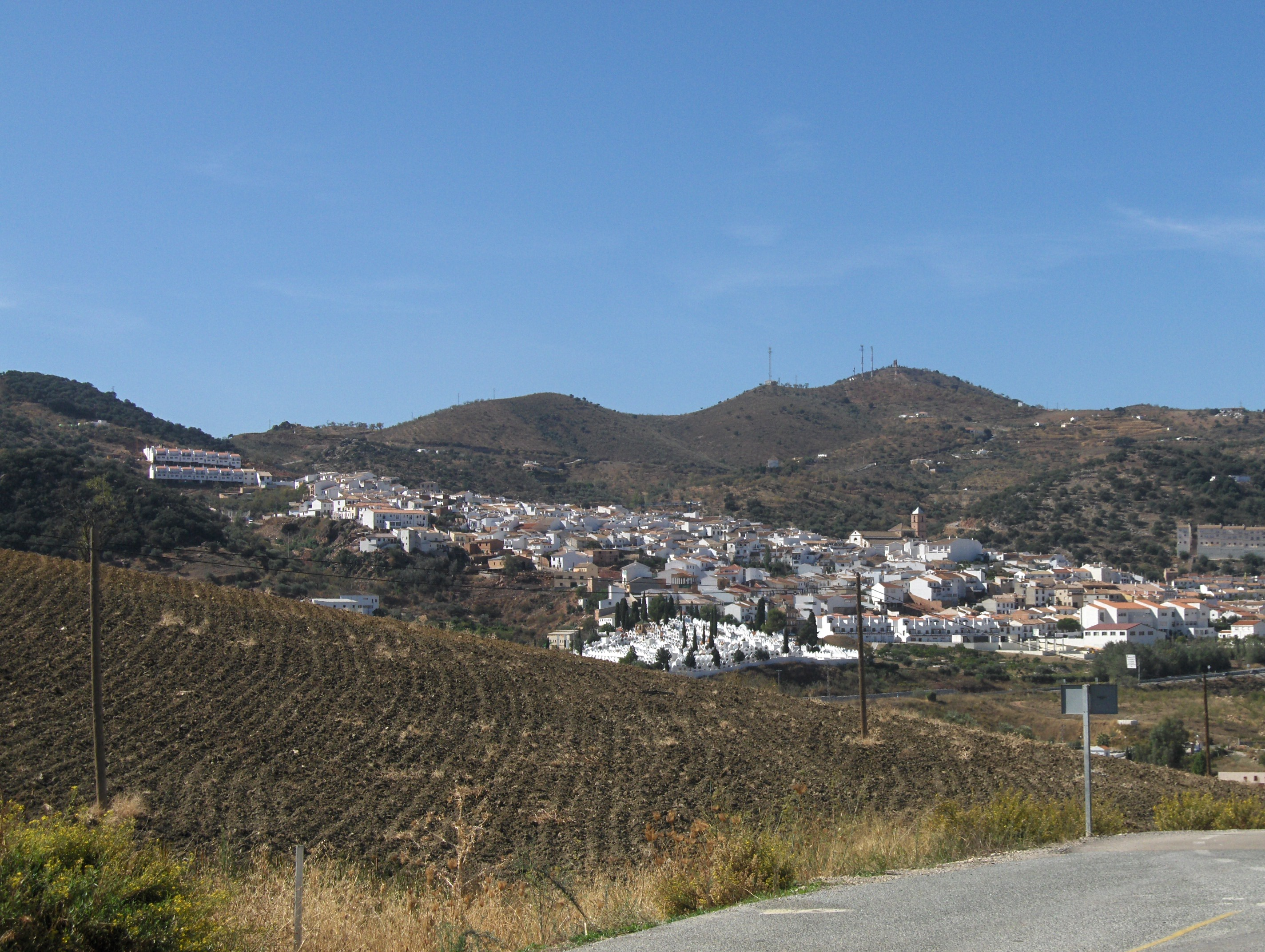

- Flag Coat of arms

- Location in Spain Casabermeja (Andalusia) Casabermeja (Spain)
- Coordinates: 36°53′N 4°25′W
- Sovereign state: Spain
- Autonomous community: Andalusia
- Province: Málaga

Government
  - Mayor: Antonio Dominguez

Area
  - Total: 67.28 km^{2} (25.98 sq mi)
- Elevation: 506 m (1,660 ft)

Population (2025-01-01)
  - Total: 4,214
  - Density: 62.63/km^{2} (162.2/sq mi)
- Demonym(s): Casabermejeños, Bermejos
- Time zone: UTC+1 (CET)
  - Summer (DST): UTC+2 (CEST)
- Postal code: 29160
- Dialing code: 95
- Official language(s): Spanish
- Website: Official website

Casabermeja is a town and municipality in the province of Málaga, part of the autonomous community of Andalusia in southern Spain. The municipality is situated approximately 20 kilometres from the provincial capital, the city of Malaga.

== See also ==
- List of municipalities in Málaga
