= Alameda, Andalusia =

Alameda
- Municipality and town
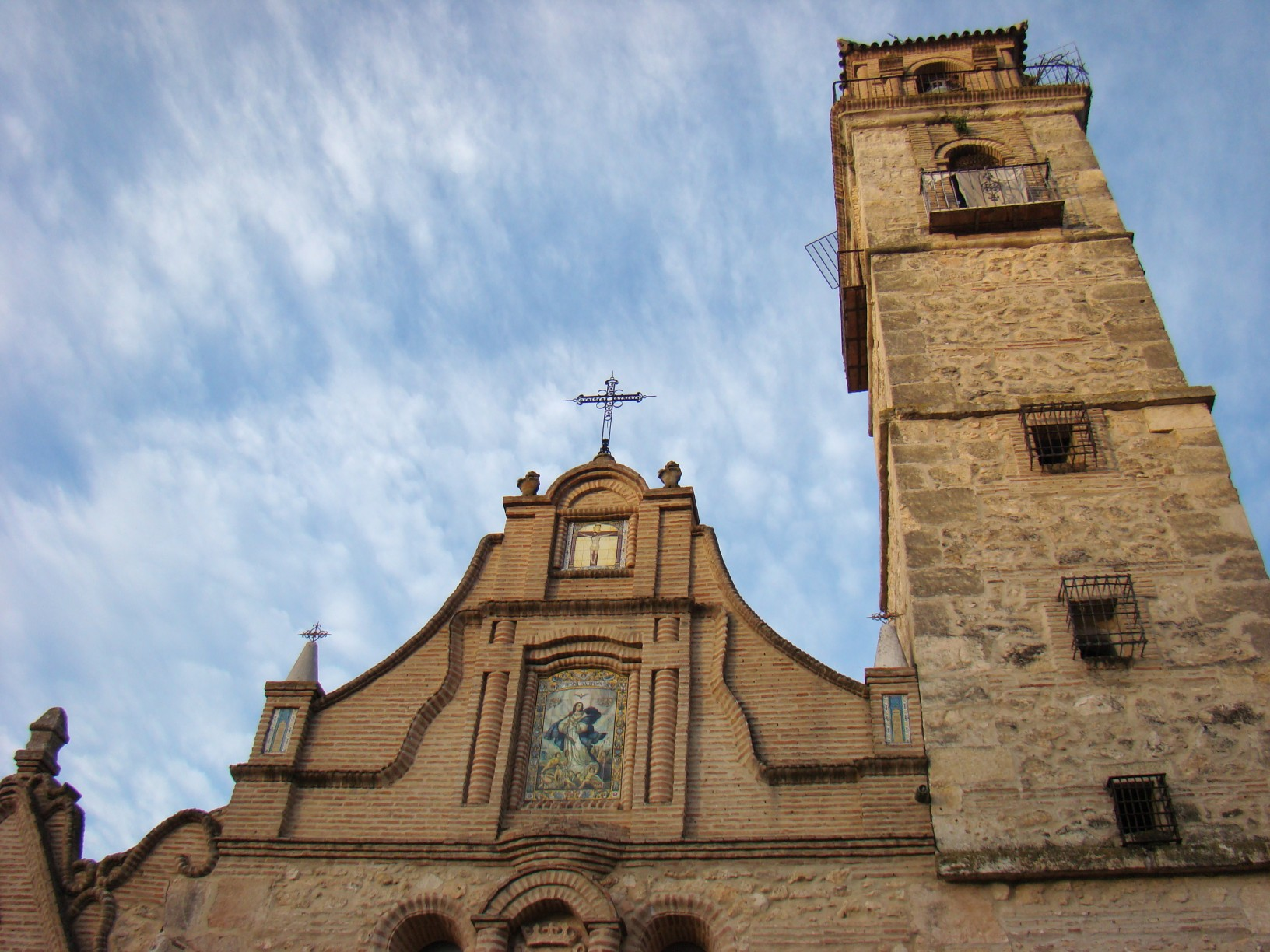

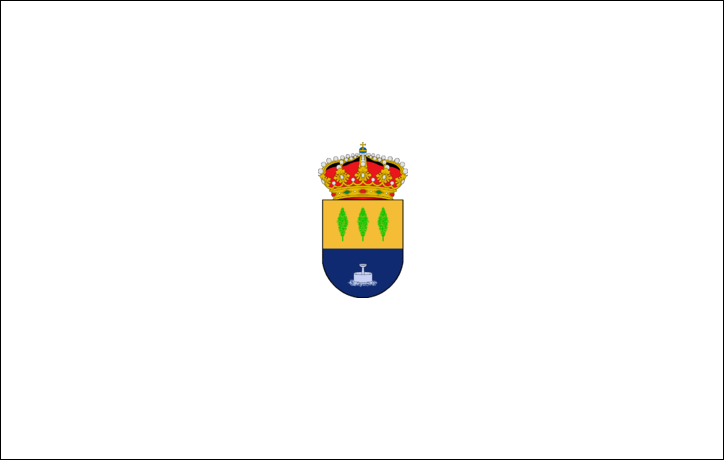
- Flag Coat of arms

- Municipal location in Málaga Province

- Location in Spain Alameda (Andalusia) Alameda (Spain)
- Coordinates: 37°12′N 4°39′W
- Sovereign state: Spain
- Autonomous community: Andalusia
- Province: Málaga
- Comarca: Antequera

Area
  - Total: 25 sq mi (65 km^{2})

Population (2025-01-01)
  - Total: 5,426
- Time zone: UTC+1 (CET)
  - Summer (DST): UTC+2 (CEST)
- Website: www.alameda.es

Alameda is a town and municipality in the province of Málaga, part of the autonomous community of Andalusia in southern Spain. The municipality is situated approximately 85 km from the city of Málaga. It has a population of approximately 5,000 and the natives are called Alamedanos or Lametanos. It takes its name from the stream Álamos, which crosses the municipality. The Bandito "El Tempranillo" is buried here.

It is located north of Antequera and 430 meters above sea level. The average annual precipitation is in the 610 L/m^{2} and the average temperature is 16 °C.

Almadea has an area of about 65 km^{2}.

== Geography ==
The municipality of Alameda, the northernmost province of Malaga, lies on a plain in which only a few small hills break the horizontal landscape which is abound with olives. This befits an area close to the countryside of Cordoba and Seville.

== History ==
The archaeological remains found in this area show that since the Neolithic period the area, now the municipality, has been the basis for many human settlements.

In 208 B.C., during the times of Carthage, Iberian inhabitants of the area, to be besieged by the Romans, set fire to the village and perished in said fire to remain loyal to the Carthaginians.

During the Roman Empire it is known that Alameda was an enclave of strategic importance because three of the major roads to Baetica passed through the municipality. One, la Real, continues to cross town from the Plaza of Spain to the Plaza de Andalucia.

Little is known about the history of Alameda from then until the sixteenth century. Only a small Visigoth treasure the sixth century indicates that there was a settlement at that time in this location. And once the sixteenth century began, it became part of the Marquess of Estepa. Give that within the area the roads that connected Granada, Málaga and Seville crossed, the Marquis de Estepa, in 1663, decided to build the parish Immaculate Conception, around which the population was established.

Apart from the first half of the nineteenth century, Alameda forms part of the province of Málaga.

In the Plaza de Andalucia, which can be considered today the center of town, is a tombstone of 1994 which reads "The first Republican council, established on June 27, 1931, ordered the bell of the clock with the names of their councilors in relief, being carved during the unfortunate events of 1936. Being unreadable today, in their remembrance this plate is placed. "

== Politics and administration ==
The political administration of the municipality is carried out through a democratically controlled town council whose members are elected every four years by universal suffrage.

== See also ==
- List of municipalities in Málaga
