= 2023 in rail transport =

This article lists events related to rail transport that occurred in 2023.

== Events ==
=== January ===
- Turkey January 2 – Line M7 of the Istanbul Metro extends from Mecidiyeköy to Yıldız.
- Turkey January 6 – Line M8 of the Istanbul Metro opens between Bostancı and Parseller.
- United States January 7 – Line T Third Street of the San Francisco Muni Metro rerouted via the Central Subway to Chinatown station.
- January 18
  - China – Beijing Subway introduces through service between Line 9 and the Fangshan Line.
  - China – Chongqing Rail Transit: Line 9 extends from Xingke Ave to Huashigou and Line 10 extends from Liyuchi to Houbao.
- India January 19 – Mumbai Metro: Line 2 extends from Dahanukarwadi to Andheri West and Line 7 extends from Aarey to Gundavali.
- Turkey January 22 – Line M11 of the Istanbul Metro opens between Kağıthane and Kargo Terminali.
- Mauritius January 23 – Metro Express: Service extends from Port Louis Victoria to Place d'Armes and Rèduit branch opens.
- United States January 25 – MTA Long Island Rail Road opens shuttle service between Jamaica and Grand Central Madison via the East Side Access.

=== February ===
- China February 4 – Changping Line of the Beijing Subway extends from Qinghe railway station to Xitucheng.
- Iran February 8 – Line 2 of the Shiraz Metro opens between Qahramanan and Imam Hossein.
- Taiwan February 10 – Ankeng light rail of the New Taipei Metro opens between Shuangcheng and Shisizhang.
- Algeria February 18 – Mostaganem tramway: Line 1 opens between La Salamandre and Karouba and Line 2 opens between Gare de Mostaganem SNTF and Nouvelle Gare Routière.
- February 27
  - China – Line 5 of Chongqing Rail Transit extends from The Expo Garden Center to Yuegangbeilu.
  - Iran – Line 2 of the Karaj Metro opens between Golshahr 45-metre and Ayatollah Taleghani.
  - United States – MTA Long Island Rail Road begins full service to Grand Central Madison via the East Side Access.

=== March ===
- Russia March 1 – Bolshaya Koltsevaya Line of the Moscow Metro extends from Kashirskaya to Nizhegorodskaya and from Elektrozavodskaya to Savyolovskaya.
- March 10
  - United Kingdom – Luton DART opens between Luton Airport and Luton Airport Parkway.
  - United States – R211A cars enter passenger service on the A line of the MTA New York City Subway.
- March 16
  - Malaysia – MRT Putrajaya Line extends from Kampung Batu to Putrajaya Sentral.
  - Panama – Line 2 of the Panama Metro extends via a branch from Corredor Sur to Aeropuerto.
- China March 17 – Line 5 of the Dalian Metro opens between Hutan Xinqu and Houguan.
- March 18
  - Azerbaijan – Baku-Gabala train route in Azerbaijan was launched.
  - Iran – Tehran Metro: Line 6 extends from Tarbiat Modares University to Imam Hossein and Line 7 extends from Meydan-e San'at to Shahid Dadman.
  - Japan – Eastern Kanagawa Rail Link: Tōkyū Shin-Yokohama Line opens between Shin-yokohama and Hiyoshi and Sōtetsu Shin-Yokohama Line extends from Hazawa Yokohama-Kokudai to Shin-yokohama.
  - Japan – Umeda Freight Line switches to a new underground alignment to serve an expanded Ōsaka Station.
- India March 26 – Purple Line of the Namma Metro extends via a disconnected branch from Krishnarajapura to Whitefield (Kadugodi).
- March 27
  - Japan – Nanakuma Line of the Fukuoka City Subway extends from Tenjin-Minami to Hakata.
  - (Spain) – Málaga Metro: Line 1 extends from El Perchel to Atarazanas and Line 2 extends from El Perchel to Guadalmedina.
- (Netherlands) March 31 – Line B of the Rotterdam Metro extends from Hoek van Holland Haven to Hoek van Holland Strand.

=== April ===
- Japan April 1 – Rumoi Main Line closes between Ishikari-Numata and Rumoi.
- China April 7 – Jinyidong Line of the Jinhua Rail Transit extends from Sports Center to Ming & Qing Dynasty Palaces.
- Turkey April 8 – Line M3 of the Istanbul Metro extends from Başakşehir MetroKent to Kayaşehir Merkez.
- (Spain) April 11 – Vitoria-Gasteiz tram network extends from Florida to Salburua.
- Turkey April 12 – Line M4 of the Ankara Metro extends from Atatürk Kültür Merkezi to Kızılay.
- China (Laos) April 13 – Cross-border passenger service begins between Kunming and Vientiane via the Kunming-Yuxi, Yuxi-Mohan, and Boten-Vientiane rail corridors.
- Canada (Mexico) (United States) April 14 – Canadian Pacific and Kansas City Southern merge to form CPKC.
- Turkey April 20 – Akçaray tram extends from Plajyolu to Kuruçeşme.
- (Uzbekistan) April 25 – Circle Line of the Tashkent Metro extends from Qoʻyliq to Kuruvchilar.
- Turkey April 26 – Ankara–Sivas high speed railway opens for commercial operation.
- (France) April 29 – Line A of the Bordeaux tram network extends via a branch from Quatre Chemins to Aéroport de Bordeaux-Mérignac.

=== May ===
- Iran May 1 – Line 4 of the Tehran Metro extends from Eram-e Sabz to Allameh Ja'fari.
- (Ecuador) May 2 – Line 1 of the Quito Metro opens for partial commercial operation between El Labrador and Quitumbe.
- China May 9 – Changsha Dawangshan SkyShuttle opens between Shantang and Guanyingang.
- (Ecuador) May 11 – Line 1 of the Quito Metro ends service a week after opening.
- United Kingdom May 28 – DfT Operator's TransPennine Express takes over the TransPennine contract from FirstGroup.

=== June ===
- June 1
  - China – TEDA Modern Guided Rail Tram ends service.
  - China – Zhangjiang Tram ends service.
- China June 6 – Line 4 of the Changchun Rail Transit extends from Tiangong Road to Tianxin Road.
- United Kingdom June 7 – Edinburgh Trams extends from St Andrew Square, Edinburgh to Newhaven.
- (Russia) June 8 – Lastochka train starts operating passenger services to Abkhazia, linking Sochi and Gagra
- (Switzerland) June 11 – Commercial service opens between Montreux and Interlaken Ost.
- United States June 16 – Los Angeles Metro Rail: A Line extends from 7th Street/Metro Center to APU/Citrus College via the Regional Connector, E Line extends from 7th Street/Metro Center to Atlantic via the Regional Connector, and L Line ends service.
- (Thailand) June 19 – MRT Yellow Line opens between Lat Phrao and Samrong.
- June 24
  - China – Line 11 of the Suzhou Metro opens between Weiting and Huaqiao.
  - – Line 10 of the Île-de-France tram network opens between La Croix de Berny and Jardin Parisien.
- China June 27 – Xi'an Metro: Line 2 extends from Xi'an Beizhan to Caotan and from Weiqunan to Changninggong and Line 16 opens between Qinchuangyuanzhongxin and Shijingli.
- June 28
  - China – Xihuan Line, a southern extension of Line 3 of the Changsha Metro, opens between Shantang and Xiangtan North railway station.
  - China – Line S4 of the Nanjing Metro opens between Chahe and Chuzhou Railway Station.
- China June 29 – Line 2 of the Lanzhou Metro opens between Yanbai Bridge and Dongfanghong Square.
- United States June 30 – Honolulu Skyline opens on the island of Oʻahu between Kualakaʻi and Hālawa.

=== July ===
- July 1
  - (South Korea) – Seohae Line of the Seoul Metropolitan Subway extends from Sosa to Daegok.
  - China – Line 1 of the Hefei Metro extends from Hefei Railway Station to Zhangwa.
- (Italy) July 4 – Line 4 of the Milan Metro extends from Dateo to San Babila.
- (France) July 8 – Angers tramway: Line B opens between Belle-Beille Campus and Monplaisir and Line C opens between Belle-Beille Campus and Angers Roseraie.
- (Philippines) July 20 – LRTA 13000 class cars enter passenger service on Line 1 of the Manila Light Rail Transit System.
- Canada July 24 – Line 3 Scarborough of the Toronto Subway ends service.
- China July 26 – Line 2 of the Shaoxing Metro opens from Jinghu Hospital to Tandu.
- July 31
  - Canada – First phase of the Réseau express métropolitain opens in Greater Montreal between Brossard and Central Station.
  - Taiwan – Airport MRT Line of the Taoyuan Metro extends from Huanbei to Laojie River.

=== August ===
- India August 1 – Pune Metro: Purple Line extends from Phugewadi to Civil Court and Aqua Line extends from Garware College to Ruby Hall Clinic.
- (Finland) August 7 – Line 3 of the Tampere light rail network extends from Pyynikintori to Santalahti.
- Russia August 17 – Line D3 of the Moscow Central Diameters opens from Zelenograd-Kryukovo to Ippodrom.
- (Israel) August 18 – Red Line of the Tel Aviv Light Rail opens between HaKomemiyut and Kiryat Arye and between HaKomemiyut and Petah Tikva.
- August 26
  - China – Line S2 of Wenzhou Rail Transit opens between Dongshan and Qingdong Road.
  - Japan – Utsunomiya Light Rail opens between Utsunomiya Station East and Haga Takanezawa Industrial Park.
- China August 27 – Fuzhou Metro: Line 4 opens between Fenghuangchi and Difengjiang and Line 5 extends from Ancient Luozhou Town and Fuzhou South Railway Station.
- (Indonesia) August 28 – Jabodebek LRT: Cibubur Line opens between Harjamukti and Dukuh Atas BNI and Bekasi Line opens between Jati Mulya and Dukuh Atas BNI.
- Turkey August 30 – Line T5 of the Istanbul Tram extends from Cibali to Eminönü.

=== September ===
- (Nigeria) September 4 – Blue Line of the Lagos Rail Mass Transit opens for limited commercial operation between Mile 2 and Marina.
- Russia September 6 – Solntsevskaya Line of the Moscow Metro extends from Rasskazovka to Aeroport Vnukovo.
- Russia September 7 – Lyublinsko-Dmitrovskaya Line of the Moscow Metro extends from Seligerskaya to Fiztekh.
- China September 8 – Line 3 of the Zhengzhou Metro extends between Yinggang and Binhe Xincheng Nan.
- Russia September 9 – Line D4 of the Moscow Central Diameters opens from Zheleznodorozhnaya to Aprelevka.
- (Mexico) September 15 – El Insurgente commuter rail opens from Zinacantepec to Lerma.
- United States September 16 – T Line of the Link light rail system extends from Theater District to St. Joseph.
- September 17
  - (India) – Airport Express Line of the Delhi Metro extends from Dwarka Sector 21 to Yashobhoomi Dwarka Sector 25.
  - United Kingdom – Line 1 of the West Midlands Metro extends from The Royal to Wolverhampton.
- (Mexico) September 18 – Line Z and Line K of the Tren Interoceánico resume freight service.
- China September 21 – Line 1 of the Xi'an Metro extends from Fenghesenlingongyuan to Xianyangxizhan.
- United States September 22 – Brightline extends from West Palm Beach to Orlando International Airport.
- (Chile) September 25 – Line 3 of the Santiago Metro extends from Los Libertadores to Plaza de Quilicura.
- September 26
  - China – Guangzhou–Shanwei high-speed railway opens.
  - China – Optics Valley Suspended Monorail opens between Jiufengshan and Longquanshan.
- September 28
  - China – Fuzhou–Xiamen high-speed railway opens.
  - China – Shanghai–Nanjing Riverside high-speed railway opens.
  - China – Line 10 of the Zhengzhou Metro opens between Zhengzhou railway station and Zhengzhou West railway station.
- September 29
  - China – Line 3 of the Harbin Metro extends from Taipingqiao to Chinese-baroque Block.
  - China – Shenyang Metro: Line 2 extends from Quanyunlu to Taoxianjichang and Line 4 opens between Zhengxinlu and Chuangxinlu.

=== October ===
- (Indonesia) October 2 – Jakarta–Bandung high-speed railway opens.
- United Kingdom October 4 – West Midlands to Manchester section of the High Speed 2 railway cancelled.
- United Kingdom October 5 – Northern Line of Merseyrail extends from Kirkby to Headbolt Lane.
- India October 9 – Purple Line of the Namma Metro extends from Kengeri to Challaghatta and connects Krishnarajapuram with Baiyappanahalli.
- Iran October 10 – Tehran Metro: Line 6 extends from Shahid Sattari to Koushar and Line 7 extends from Shahid Dadman to Meydan-e Katab.
- (Czech Republic) October 13 – Lines 4 and 5 of the Prague tram network extend from Holyně to Slivenec.
- (France) October 20 – Line B of the Lyon Metro extends from Gare d'Oullins to Saint-Genis-Laval Hôpital Lyon Sud.
- October 21
  - (Finland) – Jokeri light rail opens between Itäkeskus and Keilaniemi.
  - India – Delhi–Meerut Regional Rapid Transit System opens initial section between Sahibabad and Duhai.
- China October 26 – Line 13 of the Qingdao Metro extends from Jinggangshan Road to Jialingjiang West Road.
- Turkey October 28 – Line T4 of the Kayseray opens between Cumhuriyet Meydanı and İzzet Bayraktar Cami.
- October 29
  - (Algeria) – Boughezoul–Laghouat railway opens.
  - (United States) – L-Line of Milwaukee's The Hop opens for limited commercial operation between Wisconsin Ave and Lakefront.

=== November ===
- Canada November 4 – Valley Line of Edmonton LRT opens between 102 Street and Mill Woods.
- (Bangladesh) November 5 – Line 6 of the Dhaka Metro Rail extends from Agargaon to Motijheel.
- (Thailand) November 10 – Eastern Line of Thai Railways extends to Sattahip port with two new stations U Taphao and Chuk Samet.
- (Romania) November 15 – Line M2 of the Bucharest Metro extends from Berceni to Tudor Arghezi.
- India November 17 – Line 1 of the Navi Mumbai Metro opens from CBD Belapur to Pendhar.
- (Australia) November 20 – Transperth's Armadale and Thornlie lines close for the Victoria Park-Canning Level Crossing Removal Project.
- (Thailand) November 21 – MRT Pink Line opens for limited commercial operation between Nonthaburi Civic Center and Min Buri.
- (Chile) November 27 – Line 2 of the Santiago Metro extends from La Cisterna to Hospital El Pino.
- China November 28 – Line 19 of the Chengdu Metro extends from Jiujiang North to Tianfu Station.
- November 30
  - China – Chongqing Rail Transit: Line 5 connects Dashiba with Shiqiaopu and Line 10 extends from Houbao to Lanhualu.
  - Iran – Line 1 of the Tehran Metro extends via the Imam Khomeini Airport Branch from Forudgahi-e Imam Khomeini to Shahr-e Parand.

=== December ===
- December 1
  - China – Line 5 of the Wuhan Metro extends from Hubei University of Chinese Medicine to Hongxia.
  - (Ecuador) – Line 1 of the Quito Metro opens between El Labrador and Quitumbe.
- (France) December 4 – Line V of Transilien opens between Massy-Palaiseau and Versailles Chantiers to replace newly discontinued RER C service.
- December 8 – Taipa Line of the Macau Light Rapid Transit extends from Ocean to Barra.
- (France) December 9 – RER C ends service between Savigny-sur-Orge and Massy-Palaiseau.
- December 10
  - – Line T12 of the Île-de-France tramway network opens between Évry-Courcouronnes to Massy-Palaiseau.
  - (Germany) – Line 13 of the Hannover Stadtbahn opens between Wallensteinstraße and Hemmingen.
  - (Switzerland) – Line 15 of the Geneva tramway network extends from Palettes to ZIPLO.
- (Mexico) December 15 – Tren Maya opens between Cancún and San Francisco de Campeche.
- December 16
  - China – Line 3 of the Guiyang Metro opens between Luowan and Tongmuling.
  - (South Korea) – Line 1 of the Seoul Metropolitan Subway extends from Soyosan to Yeoncheon.
- (Germany) December 17 – Line 16 of the Mannheim/Ludwigshafen tramway network opens between Bensheimer and Sullivan.
- December 20
  - China – Line 12 of the Zhengzhou Metro opens between Longzihu Dong and Lianghu.
  - (Ukraine) – Dnipro City Express opens between Dnipro and Kamianske.
- (Peru) December 21 – Line 2 of the Lima Metro opens between Evitamiento and Mercado Santa Anita.
- December 22
  - (Mexico) – Line Z of the Tren Interoceánico opens for commercial operation between Salina Cruz and Coatzacoalcos.
  - (Poland) – Line 25 of the Silesian Interurbans extends from Dąb Huta Baildon to Katowice Dąbrowki.
- China December 23 – Suzhou Metro introduces through service between Line 3 and Line 11.
- December 26
  - (Brazil) – Line 1 of the Salvador Metro extends from Campinas to Águas Claras.
  - China – Line 3 of the Harbin Metro extends from Chinese-baroque Block to Beima Road.
  - China – Hefei Metro: Line 2 extends from Sanshibu to Cuozhen and Line 3 extends from Xingfuba to Sheng Ertong Yiyuan Xinqu.
- December 27
  - China – Line 2 of Nantong Rail Transit opens between Xingfu and Xianfeng.
  - China – Line 8 of the Shenzhen Metro extends from Yantian Road to Xiaomeisha.
  - (Philippines) – PNR South Main Line reopens between Naga and Legazpi.
- December 28
  - China – Line 18 of Chongqing Rail Transit opens between Fuhualu and Tiaodengnan.
  - China – Guangzhou Metro: Line 5 extends from Wenchong to Huangpu New Port and Line 7 extends from Higher Education Mega Center South to Yanshan.
  - China – Line 7 of the Nanjing Metro extends via a disconnected branch from Yingtiandajie to Xishanqiao.
  - China – Line 11 of the Tianjin Metro opens between Dongjiangdao and Dongliliujinglu.
  - China – Zhengxu Line of the Zhengzhou Metro opens between Chang'anlubei and Xuchangdong Railway Station.
- December 30
  - China – Beijing Subway: Line 11 extends from Jin'anqiao to Moshikou, Line 16 extends from Yushuzhuang to Wanpingcheng, and Line 17 extends via a disconnected branch from Future Science City North to Workers' Stadium.
  - China – Line 19 of the Wuhan Metro opens between West Square of Wuhan Railway Station and Xinyuexi Park.
  - (Poland) – Line 4 of the Olsztyn tramway network opens between Dworzec Głowny and Pieczewo.
- (Mexico) December 31 – Tren Maya extends from San Francisco de Campeche to Palenque.
