= La Alameda metro station (Quito) =

Quito metro station

Estación La Alameda
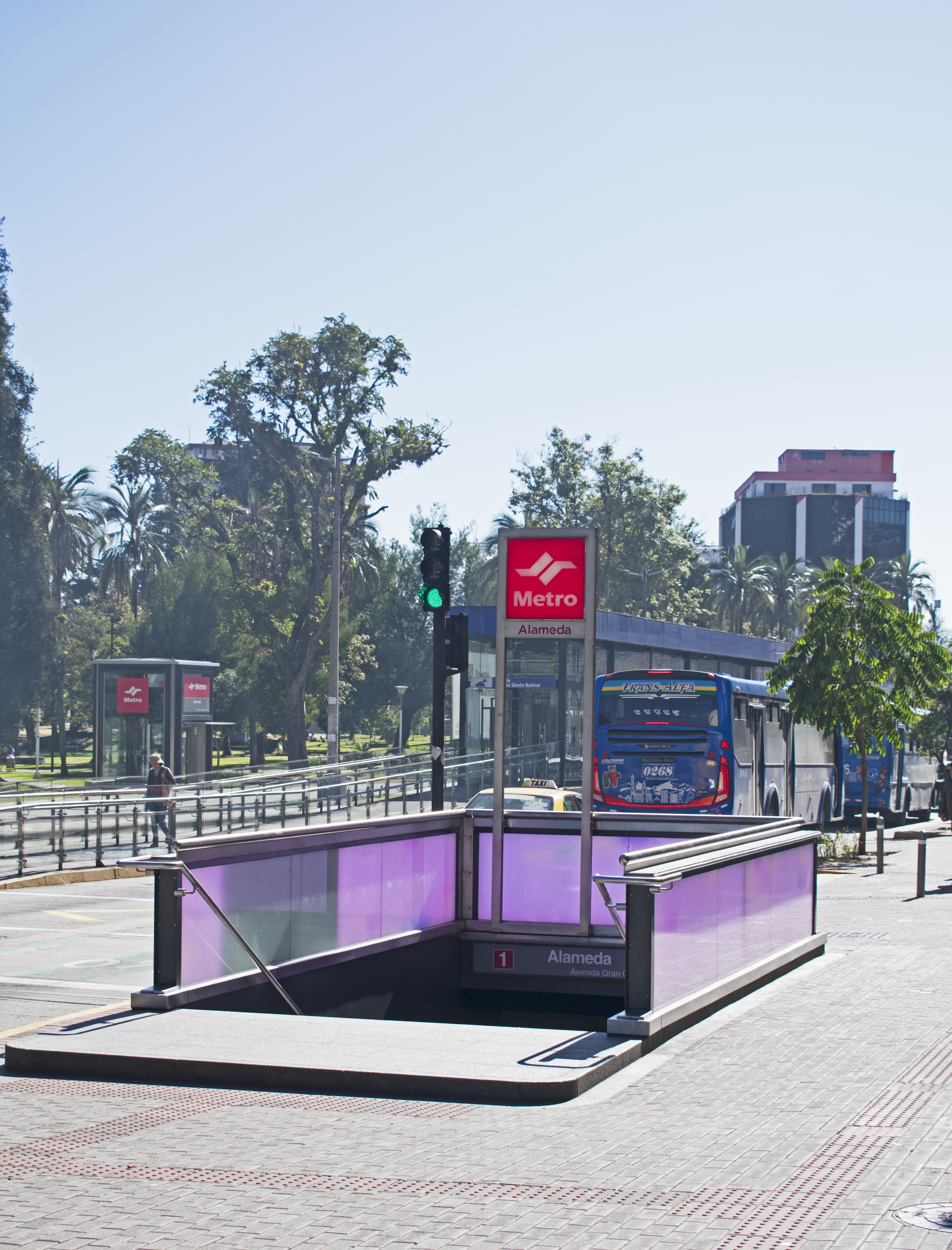
- Southern entrance

General information
- Location: Ecuador
- Coordinates: 0°12′54.7″S 78°30′4.3″W
- System: Quito Metro station
- Line: Line 1

History
- Opened: 21 December 2022

Services
Preceding station	Quito Metro	Following station
San Francisco toward Quitumbe	Line 1	El Ejido toward El Labrador
Location

La Alameda is a Quito Metro station. It was officially opened on 21 December 2022 as part of the inaugural section of the system between Quitumbe and El Labrador. The revenue service started on 2 May 2023 and discontinued on 11 May 2023. It resumed on 1 December 2023. The station is located between El Ejido and San Francisco.

This is an underground station. The station is located below Avenida 12 de Octubre, next to La Alameda Park.

The tunnel was extended to the station on 27 August 2018. On 23 January 2023, the first train with 600 passengers to whom invitations were extended arrived at the station.
