= El Ejido metro station =

Quito metro station

Estación El Ejido
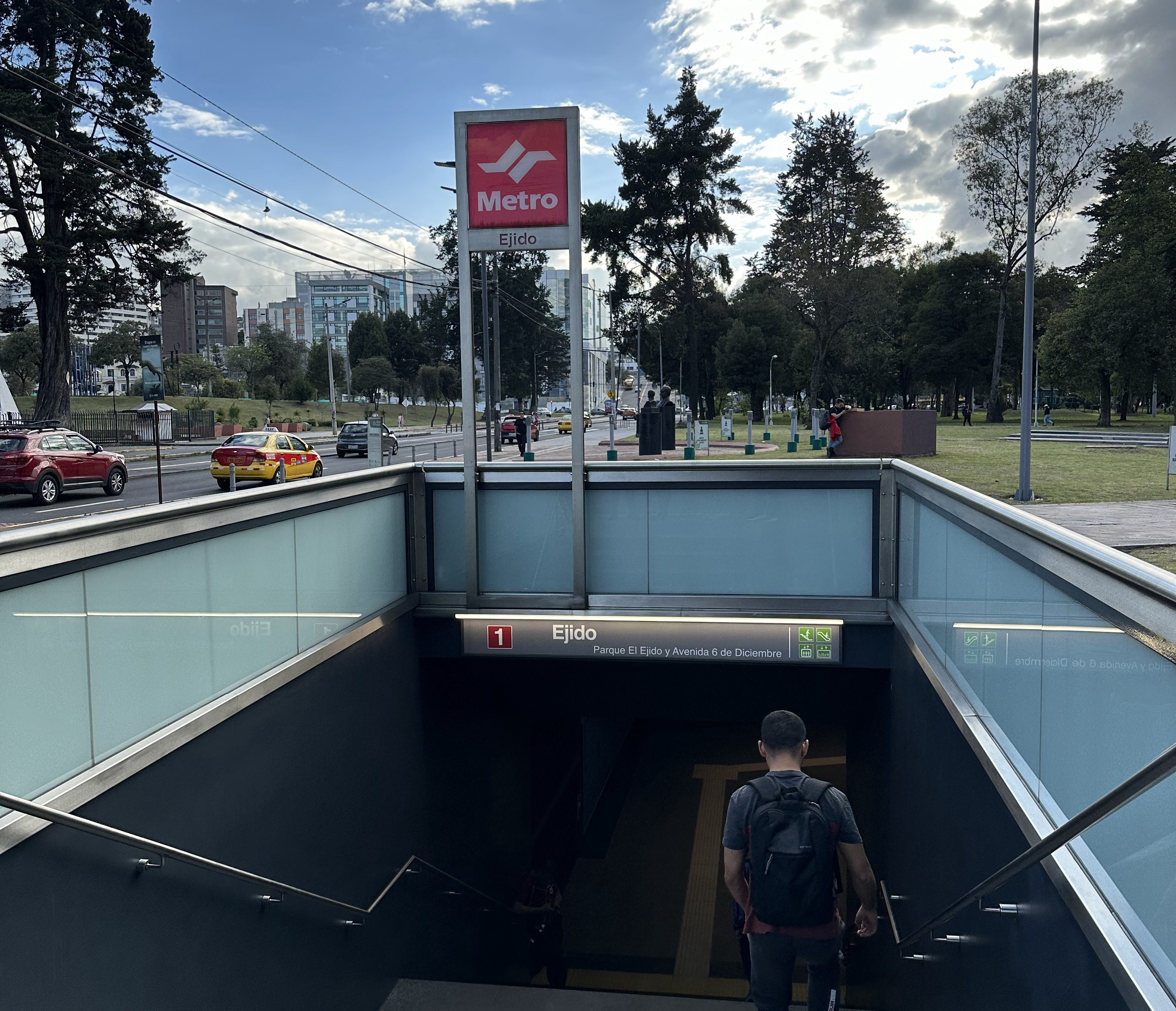

General information
- Location: Ecuador
- Coordinates: 0°12′36.0″S 78°29′49.2″W
- System: Quito Metro station
- Line: Line 1

History
- Opened: 21 December 2022

Services
Preceding station	Quito Metro	Following station
La Alameda toward Quitumbe	Line 1	Universidad Central toward El Labrador
Location

El Ejido is a Quito Metro station. It was officially opened on 21 December 2022 as part of the inaugural section of the system between Quitumbe and El Labrador. The revenue service started on 2 May 2023 and stopped on 11 May 2023. It resumed on 1 December 2023. The station is located between Universidad Central and La Alameda.

This is an underground station. It is 28 metres (92 ft) deep.

The station is located below Avenida 6 de Diciembre, between two parks, El Ejido and Parque del Arbolito.

The tunnel reached the station on 28 July 2018. On 23 January 2023, the first train with 600 passengers to whom invitations were extended arrived at the station.
