= Iñaquito metro station =

Quito metro station

Estación Iñaquito
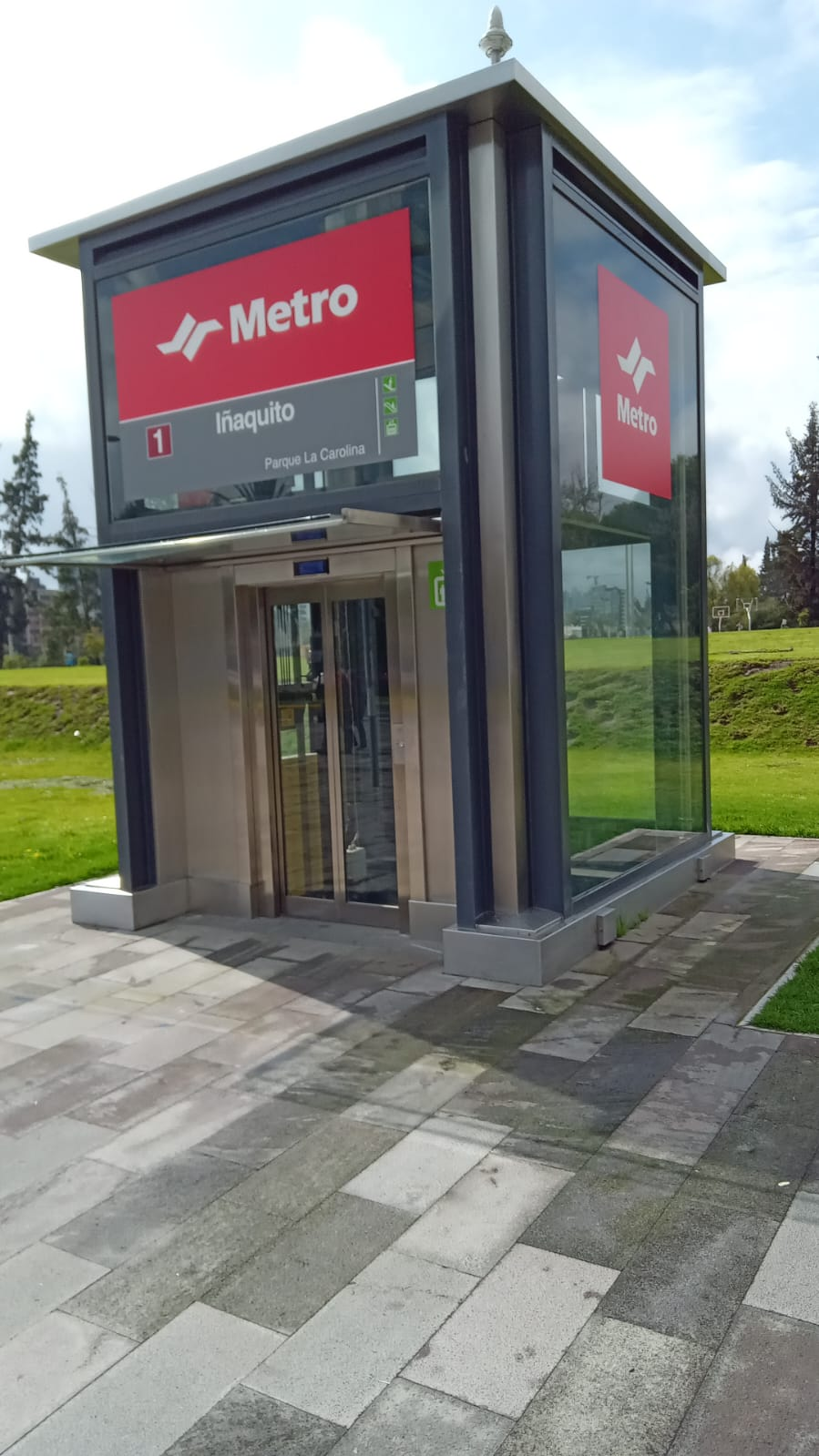

General information
- Location: Ecuador
- Coordinates: 0°10′36.1″S 78°29′1.7″W
- System: Quito Metro station
- Line: Line 1

Construction
- Accessible: yes

History
- Opened: 21 December 2022

Services
Preceding station	Quito Metro	Following station
La Carolina toward Quitumbe	Line 1	Jipijapa toward El Labrador
Location

Iñaquito is a Quito Metro station. It was officially opened on 21 December 2022 as part of the inaugural section of the system between Quitumbe and El Labrador. The revenue service started on 2 May 2023 and stopped on 11 May 2023. It resumed on 1 December 2023. The station is located between Jipijapa and La Carolina.

This is an underground station. The estimated daily number of passengers was 39,000. The station has access for disabled passengers, and has escalators.

The station is located at the intersection of Avenida Naciones Unidas and Calle Japón, in the northern part of La Carolina Park.

The construction was completed on 31 March 2021, after which the process of transfer of the station to the city was started, and the process was completed on 2 May 2021. On 23 January 2023, the first train with 600 passengers to whom invitations were extended arrived at the station.
