= Pradera metro station =

Quito metro station

Estación Pradera
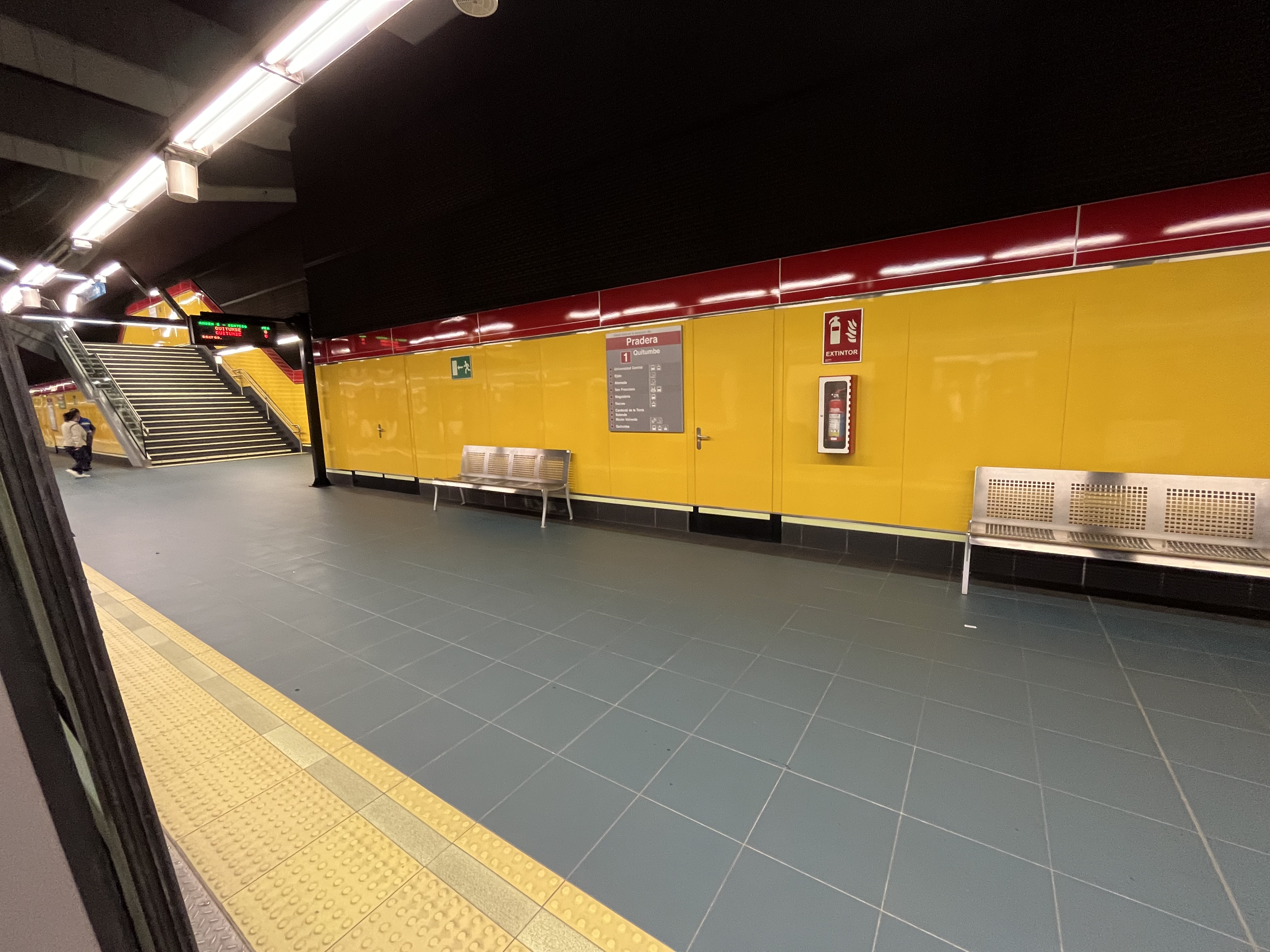

General information
- Location: Ecuador
- Coordinates: 0°11′38.9″S 78°29′32.3″W
- System: Quito Metro station
- Line: Line 1

History
- Opened: 21 December 2022

Services
| Preceding station | Quito Metro | Following station |
|---|---|---|
| Universidad Central toward Quitumbe | Line 1 | La Carolina toward El Labrador |
Location

Pradera is a Quito Metro station. It was officially opened on 21 December 2022 as part of the inaugural section of the system between Quitumbe and El Labrador. The revenue service started on 2 May 2023 and stopped on 11 May 2023. It resumed on 1 December 2023. The station is located between La Carolina and Universidad Central.

This is an underground station. The station is located at the intersection of Avenida Eloy Alfaro, Calle Inglaterra, and Calle 9 de Octubre.

On 23 January 2023, the first train with 600 passengers to whom invitations were extended arrived at the station.
