= Universidad Central metro station =

Quito metro station

Estación Universidad Central
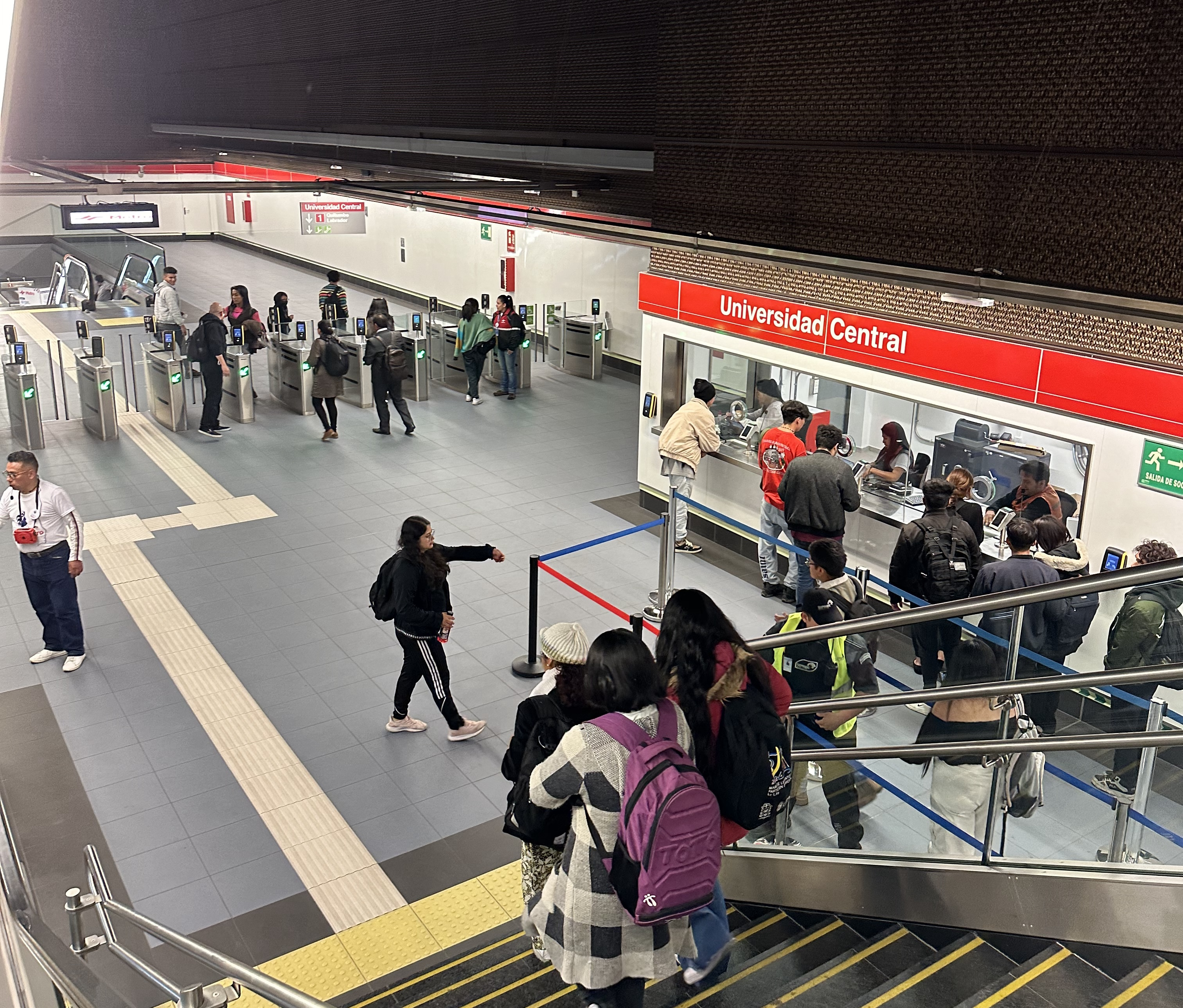

General information
- Location: Ecuador
- Coordinates: 0°11′55.6″S 78°30′1.5″W
- System: Quito Metro station
- Line: Line 1

History
- Opened: 21 December 2022

Services
Preceding station	Quito Metro	Following station
El Ejido toward Quitumbe	Line 1	Pradera toward El Labrador
Location

Universidad Central is a Quito Metro station. It was officially opened on 21 December 2022 as part of the inaugural section of the system between Quitumbe and El Labrador. The revenue service started on 2 May 2023 and stopped on 11 May 2023. It resumed on 1 December 2023. The station is located between Pradera and El Ejido.

This is an underground station and has five exits.

The station is located at the intersection of Avenida América and Calle Fray Antonio de Marchena. It is close to the campus of Central University of Ecuador, from which it takes its name.

On 23 January 2023, the first train with 600 passengers to whom invitations were extended arrived at the station.
