= La Magdalena metro station =

Quito metro station

Estación La Magdalena

General information
- Location: Ecuador
- Coordinates: 0°14′16.5″S 78°31′31.3″W
- System: Quito Metro station
- Line: Line 1

History
- Opened: 21 December 2022

Services
Preceding station	Quito Metro	Following station
El Recreo toward Quitumbe	Line 1	San Francisco toward El Labrador
Location

La Magdalena is a Quito Metro station. It was officially opened on 21 December 2022 as part of the inaugural section of the system between Quitumbe and El Labrador. The revenue service started on 2 May 2023 and stopped on 11 May 2023. It resumed on 1 December 2023. The station is located between San Francisco and El Recreo.

This is an underground station. It is located at the intersection of Avenida Rodrigo de Chávez and Avenida Jacinto Collahuazo.

On 23 January 2023, the first train with 600 passengers to whom invitations were extended arrived at the station.
