= La Carolina metro station =

Quito metro station

Estación La Carolina
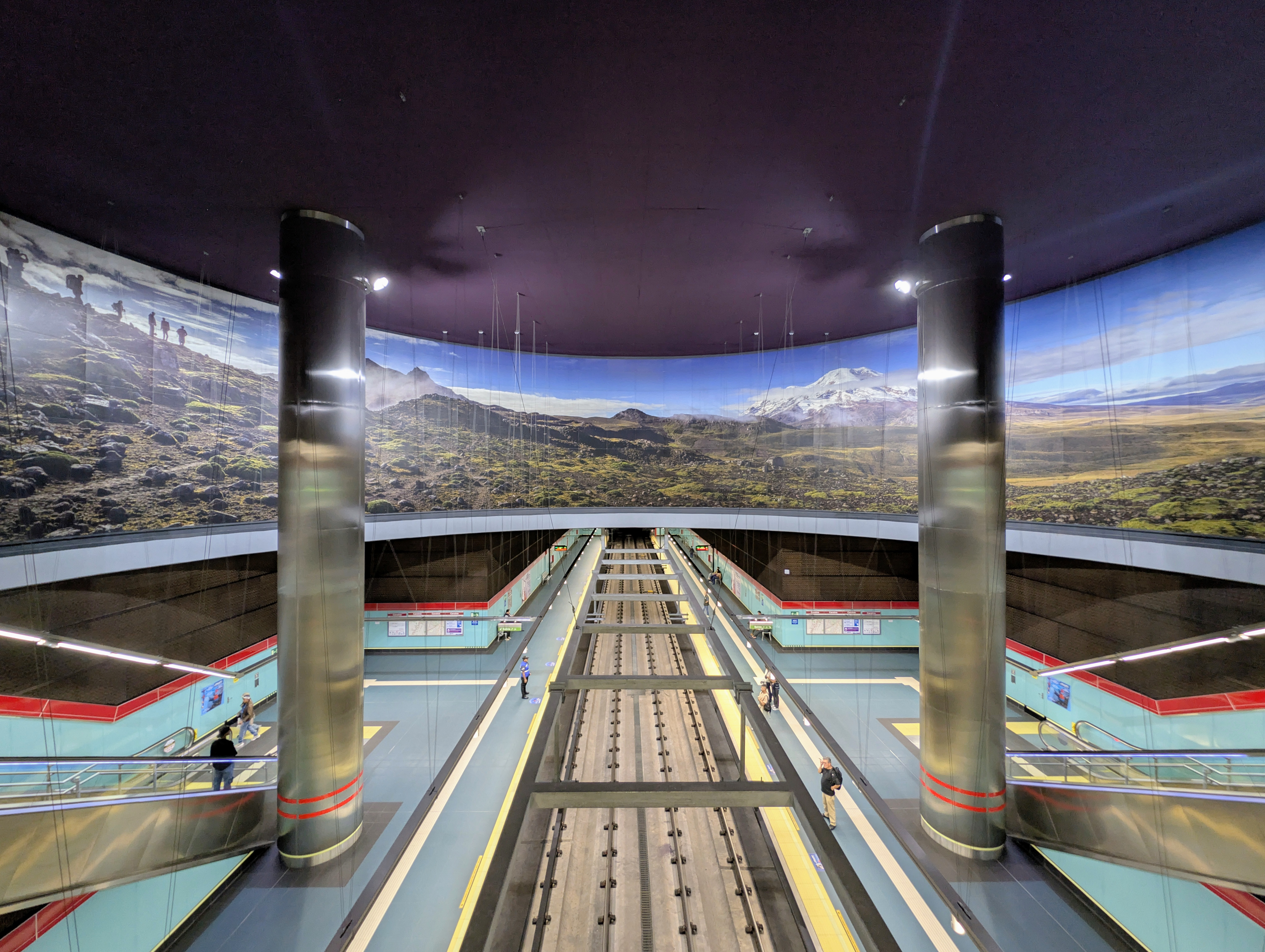

General information
- Location: Ecuador
- Coordinates: 0°11′25.4″S 78°29′7.7″W
- System: Quito Metro
- Line: Line 1

History
- Opened: 21 December 2022

Services
Preceding station	Quito Metro	Following station
Pradera toward Quitumbe	Line 1	Iñaquito toward El Labrador
Location

La Carolina is a Quito Metro station. It was officially opened on 21 December 2022 as part of the inaugural section of the system between Quitumbe and El Labrador. The revenue service started on 2 May 2023 and stopped on 11 May 2023. It resumed on 1 December 2023. The station is located between Iñaquito and Pradera.

This is an underground station. The station is located at the intersection of Avenida Eloy Alfaro and Avenida de La República, in the southern part of La Carolina Park and next to the financial center of Quito. It has four exits.

The tunnel construction reached La Carolina on 21 August 2017. On 23 January 2023, the first train with 600 passengers to whom invitations were extended arrived at the station.
