= San Francisco metro station (Quito) =

Quito metro station

Estación San Francisco
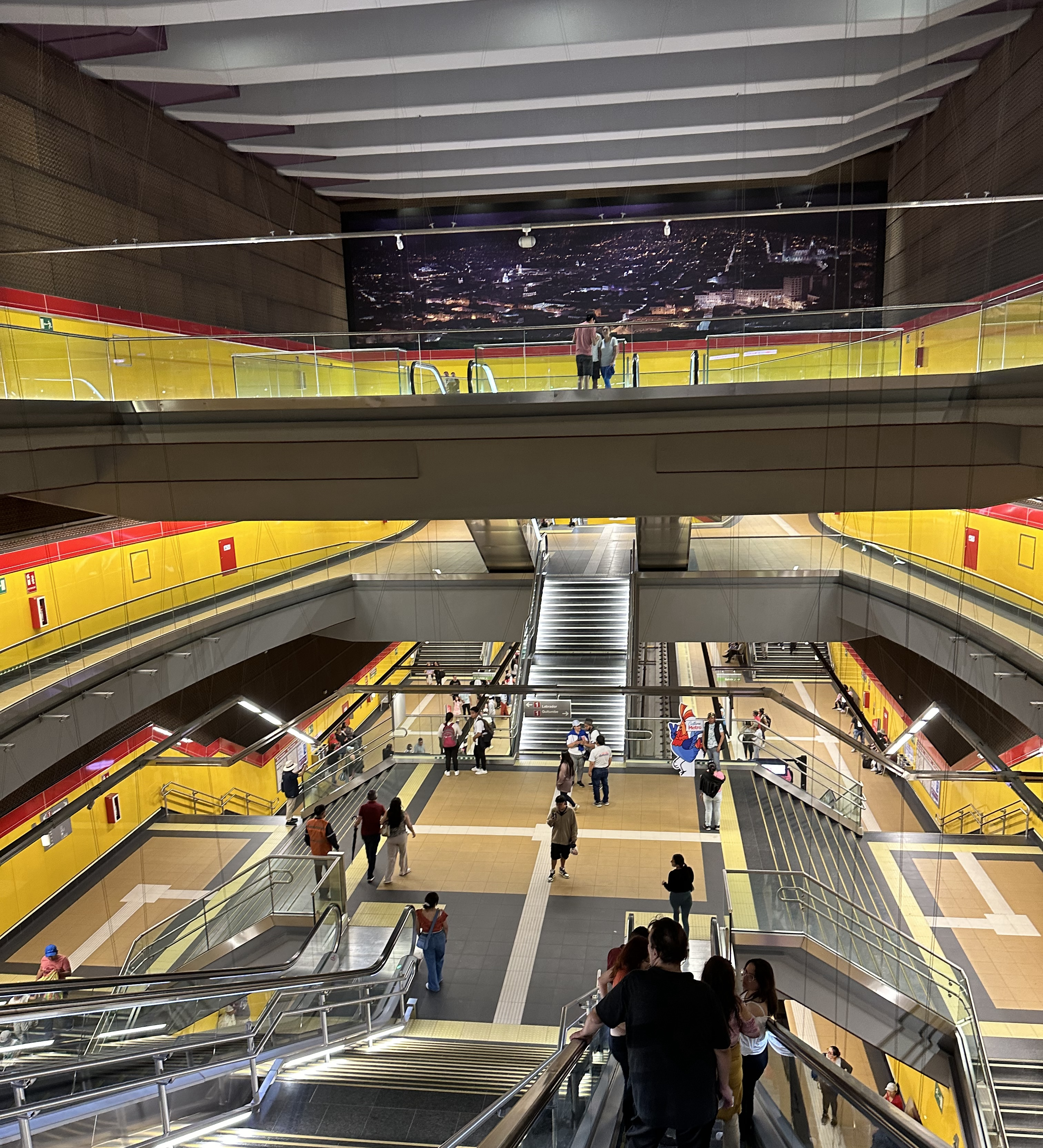

General information
- Location: Ecuador
- Coordinates: 0°13′14.2″S 78°30′51.6″W
- System: Quito Metro station
- Line: Line 1

History
- Opened: 21 December 2022

Services
Preceding station	Quito Metro	Following station
La Magdalena toward Quitumbe	Line 1	La Alameda toward El Labrador
Location

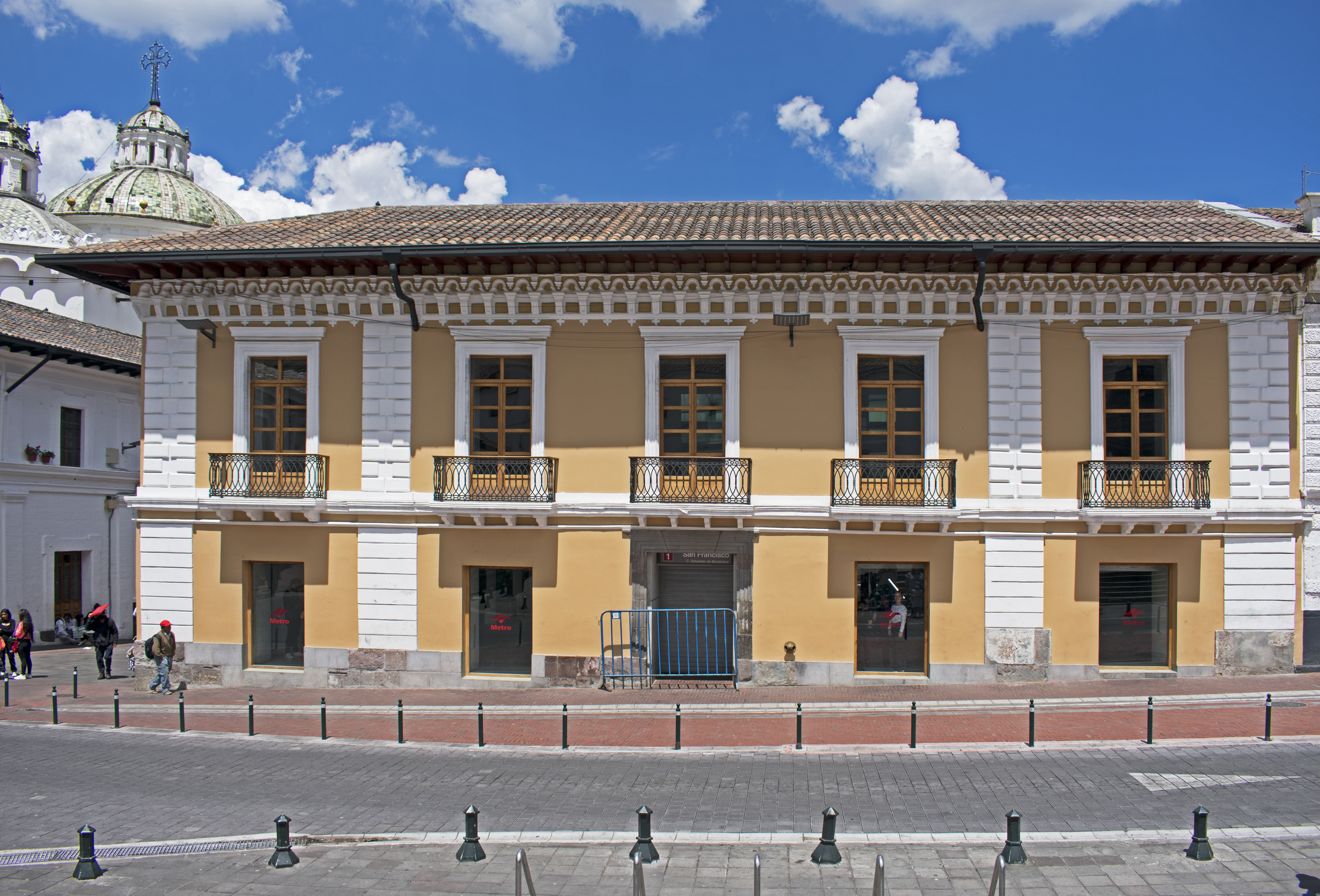
Entrance to the station from Plaza de San Francisco

San Francisco is a Quito Metro station. It was officially opened on 21 December 2022 as part of the inaugural section of the system between Quitumbe and El Labrador. The revenue service started on 2 May 2023 and stopped on 11 May 2023. It resumed on 1 December 2023. The station is located between La Alameda and La Magdalena.

This is an underground station. It has five lifts, ten escalators, and the projected ridership is 69,000 passengers per day.

The station is located in the historic center of Quito, in the eastern corner of Plaza de San Francisco, at the intersection of Calle Sebastián de Benalcázar and Calle Sucre. One of the entrances has been built within a historic building.

On 23 January 2023, the first train with 600 passengers to whom invitations were extended arrived at the station.
