= El Recreo metro station =

Quito metro station

Estación El Recreo
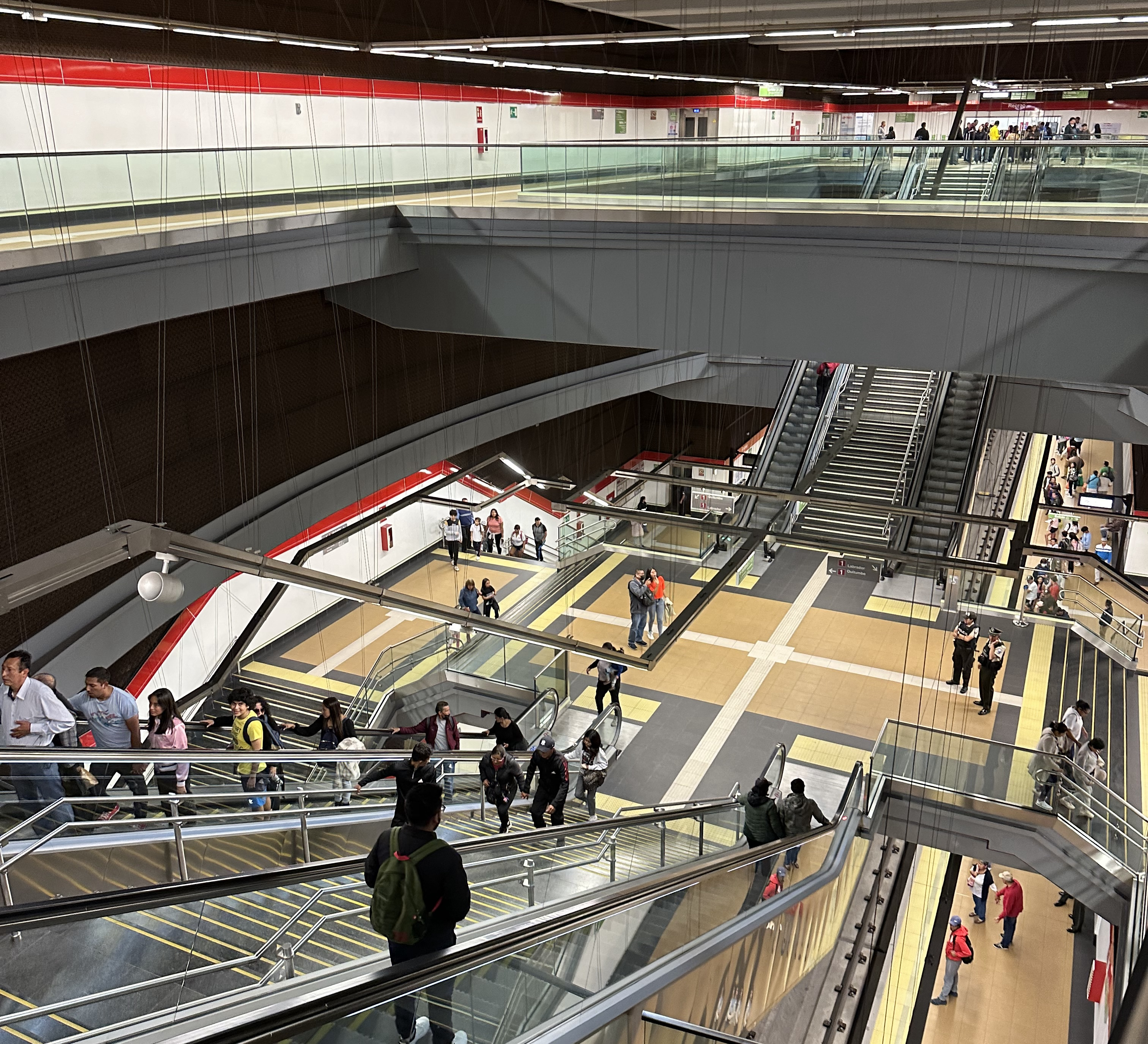

General information
- Location: Ecuador
- Coordinates: 0°15′15.9″S 78°31′20.4″W
- System: Quito Metro station
- Line: Line 1

History
- Opened: 21 December 2022

Services
Preceding station	Quito Metro	Following station
Cardenal de la Torre toward Quitumbe	Line 1	La Magdalena toward El Labrador
Location

El Recreo is a Quito Metro station. It was officially opened on 21 December 2022 as part of the inaugural section of the system between Quitumbe and El Labrador. The revenue service started on 2 May 2023 and stopped on 11 May 2023. It resumed on 1 December 2023. The station is located between La Magdalena and Cardenal de la Torre.

This is an underground station. It is located at the intersection of Avenida Pedro Vicente Maldonado and Avenida Moraspungo. The station is part of a large transfer complex which also includes the trolleybus station.

On 23 January 2023, the first train with 600 passengers to whom invitations were extended arrived at the station.
