= Cardenal de la Torre metro station =

Quito metro station

Estación Cardenal de la Torre

General information
- Location: Ecuador
- Coordinates: 0°15′25.6″S 78°31′59.6″W
- System: Quito Metro station
- Line: Line 1

History
- Opened: 21 December 2022

Services
Preceding station	Quito Metro	Following station
Solanda toward Quitumbe	Line 1	El Recreo toward El Labrador
Location

Cardenal de la Torre is a Quito Metro station. It was officially opened on 21 December 2022 as part of the inaugural section of the system between Quitumbe and El Labrador. The revenue service started on 2 May 2023 and stopped on 11 May 2023. It resumed on 1 December 2023. The station is located between El Recreo and Solanda.

This is an underground station. It is located at the intersection of Avenida Cardenal Carlos de la Torre and Calle Vicente Reyes.

The tunnel was extended to the station on 21 September 2017. On 23 January 2023, the first train with 600 passengers to whom invitations were extended arrived at the station.
