= Morán Valverde metro station =

Quito metro station

Estación Morán Valverde
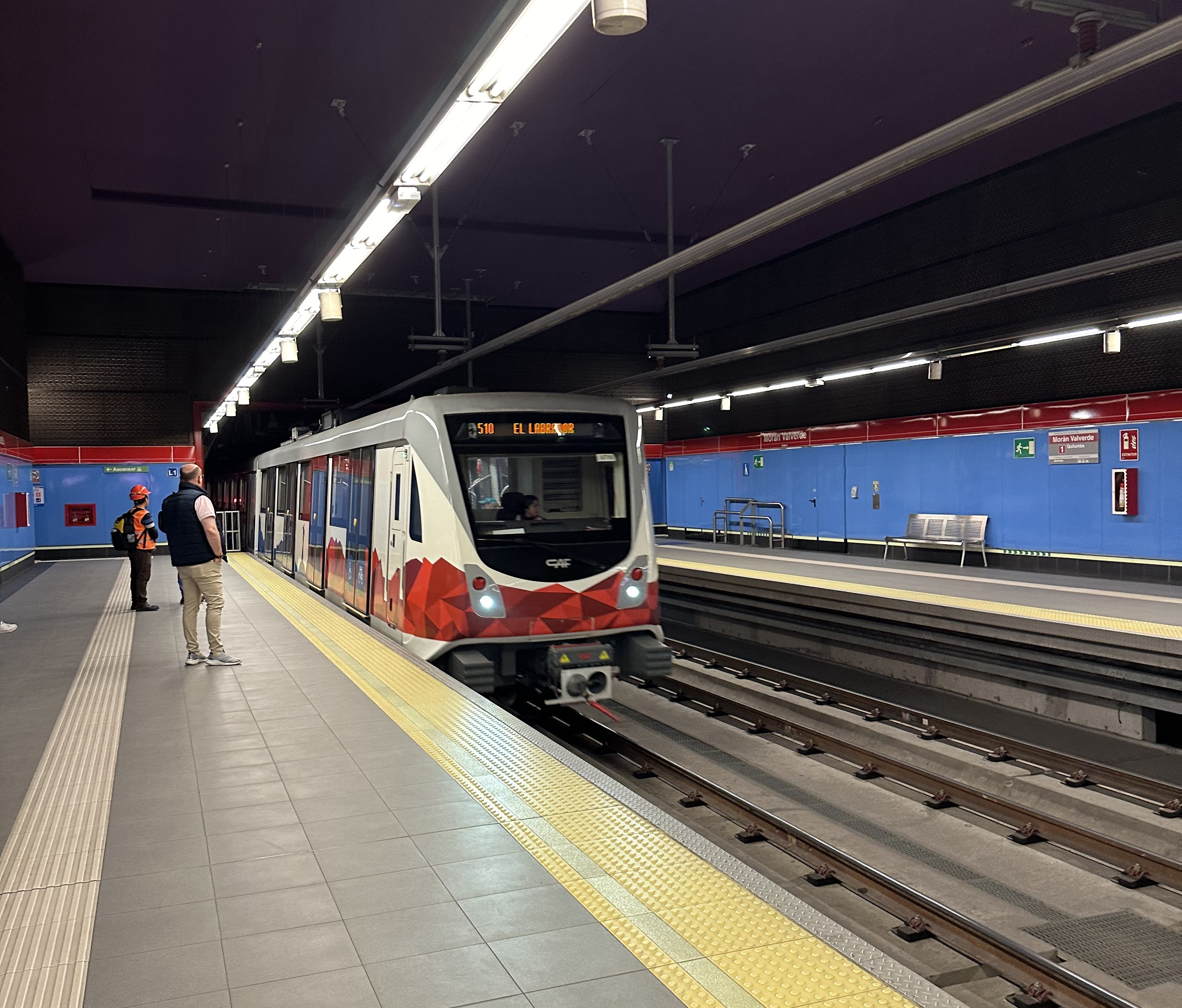

General information
- Location: Ecuador
- Coordinates: 0°16′51.3″S 78°32′55.5″W
- System: Quito Metro station
- Line: Line 1

History
- Opened: 21 December 2022

Services
Preceding station	Quito Metro	Following station
Quitumbe Terminus	Line 1	Solanda toward El Labrador
Location

Morán Valverde is a Quito Metro station. It was officially opened on 21 December 2022 as part of the inaugural section of the system between Quitumbe and El Labrador. The revenue service started on 2 May 2023 and stopped on 11 May 2023. It resumed on 1 December 2023. The station is located between Solanda and Quitumbe.

This is an underground station. It is located at the intersection of Avenida Morán Valverde and Avenida Rumichaca Ñan.

On 23 January 2023, the first train with 600 passengers to whom invitations were extended arrived at the station.
