= Fengdongchengshiguangchang station =

Metro station in Xi'an, China

Fengdongchengshiguangchang 沣东城市广场
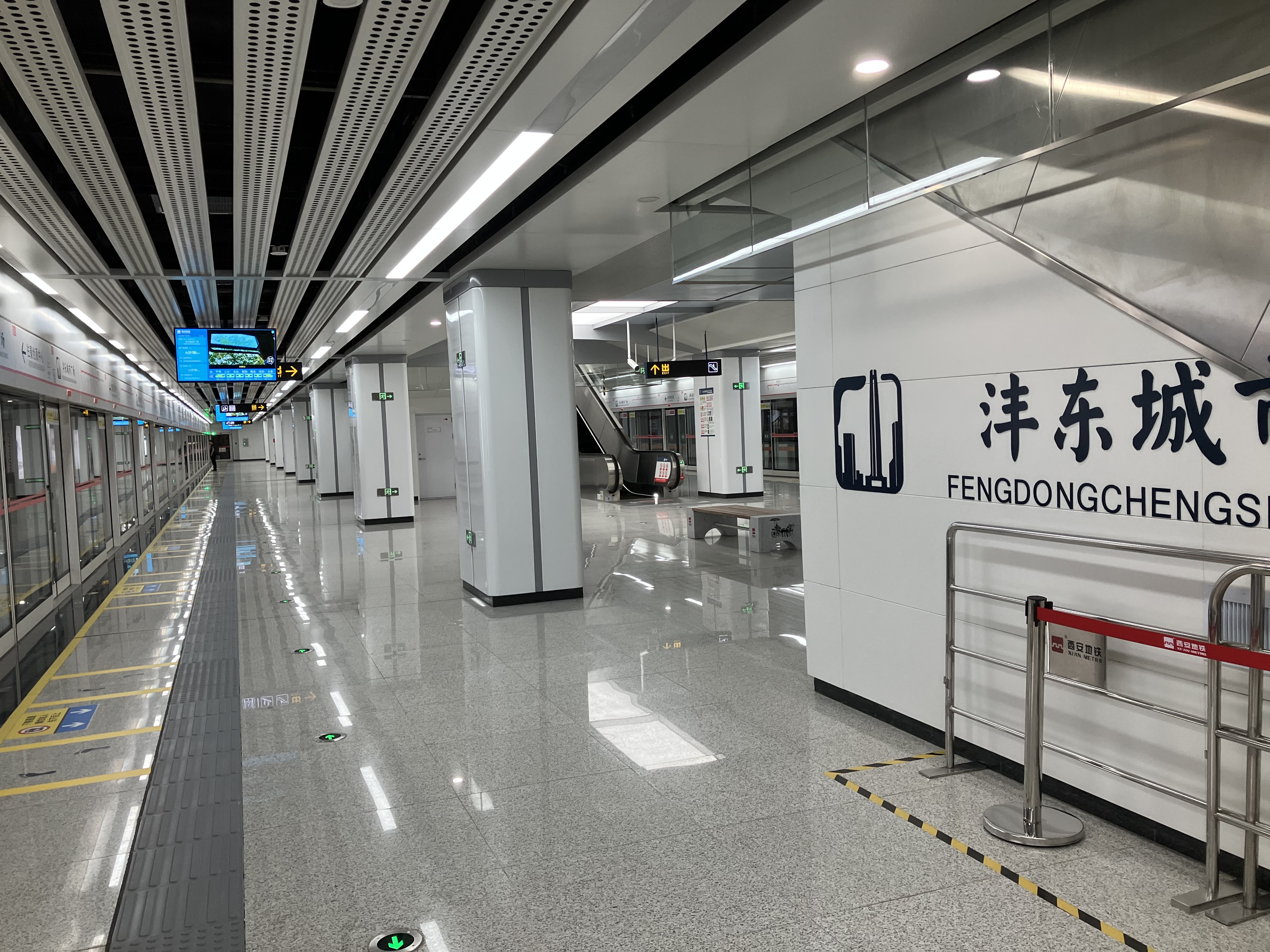
- Station platform

Chinese name
- Traditional Chinese: 沣东城市广场
- Simplified Chinese: 灃東城市廣場
- Literal meaning: Fengdong City Square
Transcriptions
Standard Mandarin
- Hanyu Pinyin: Fēngdōng chéngshì guǎngchǎng
- Wade–Giles: Fêng^{1}-tung^{1} ch‘êng^{2}-shih^{4} kuang^{3}-ch‘ang^{3}
- IPA: [fə́ŋ.tʊ́ŋ ʈʂʰə̌ŋ.ʂɨ̂ kwǎŋ.ʈʂʰàŋ]

General information
- Location: Chang'an District, Xi'an, Shaanxi; China
- Coordinates: 34.2610°N 108.7656°E
- Operator: Xi'an Metro Co. Ltd.
- Line: Line 16
- Platforms: 2 (1 island platform)

Construction
- Structure type: Underground

History
- Opened: 27 June 2023

Services
Preceding station	Xi'an Metro	Following station
Xiliuying towards Qinchuangyuanzhongxin	Line 16	Huanlegu towards Shijingli
Location

Fengdongchengshiguangchang station (Chinese: 沣东城市广场站) is a station of Line 16 of the Xi'an Metro located in Xi'an's Chang'an District. It started operations on 27 June 2023.
