= Xi'anguojizuqiuzhongxin station =

Metro station in Xi'an, China

Xi'anguojizuqiuzhongxin 西安国际足球中心
- Station platform

Chinese name
- Traditional Chinese: 西安國際足球中心
- Simplified Chinese: 西安国际足球中心
- Literal meaning: Xi'an International Football Center
Transcriptions
Standard Mandarin
- Hanyu Pinyin: Xī'ān guójì zúqiú zhōngxīn
- Wade–Giles: Hsi^{1}-an^{1} kuo^{2}-chi^{2} tsu^{2}-ch‘iu^{2} chung^{1}-hsin^{1}
- IPA: [ɕí.án kwǒ.tɕǐ tsǔ.tɕʰjǒʊ ʈʂʊ́ŋ.ɕín]

General information
- Location: Chang'an District, Xi'an, Shaanxi; China
- Operator: Xi'an Metro Co. Ltd.
- Line: Line 16
- Platforms: 2 (1 island platform)

Construction
- Structure type: Underground

History
- Opened: 27 June 2023
- Former names: Ketong Third Road (科统三路)

Services
Preceding station	Xi'an Metro	Following station
Fuxingdadaobei towards Qinchuangyuanzhongxin	Line 16	Xiliuying towards Shijingli
Location

Xi'anguojizuqiuzhongxin station (Chinese: 西安国际足球中心站) is a station of Line 16 of the Xi'an Metro located in Xi'an's Chang'an District. It started operations on 27 June 2023.
