= Jipijapa =

Jipijapa may refer to:

- The Jipijapa palm, a palm tree
- Jipijapa, another name for the Panama hat, traditionally woven from the leaves of that tree

Jipijapa as a place name:

- Jipijapa, Ecuador, a town in Ecuador
  - Jipijapa Canton, in which the town is located
  - Jipijapa metro station, a Quito Metro station
