= Xiliuying station =

Metro station in Xi'an, China

Xiliuying 细柳营
- Station platform

Chinese name
- Traditional Chinese: 细柳营
- Simplified Chinese: 細柳營
Transcriptions
Standard Mandarin
- Hanyu Pinyin: Xìliǔyíng
- Wade–Giles: Hsi^{4}-liu^{3}-ing^{2}
- IPA: [ɕî.ljòʊ.ǐŋ]

General information
- Location: Chang'an District, Xi'an, Shaanxi; China
- Operator: Xi'an Metro Co. Ltd.
- Line: Line 16
- Platforms: 2 (1 island platform)

Construction
- Structure type: Underground

History
- Opened: 27 June 2023

Services
Preceding station	Xi'an Metro	Following station
Xi'anguojizuqiuzhongxin towards Qinchuangyuanzhongxin	Line 16	Fengdongchengshiguangchang towards Shijingli
Location

Xiliuying station (Chinese: 细柳营站) is a station of Line 16 of the Xi'an Metro located in Xi'an's Chang'an District. It started operations on 27 June 2023.
