= El Perchel (Málaga Metro) =

Underground railway station in Spain

El Perchel

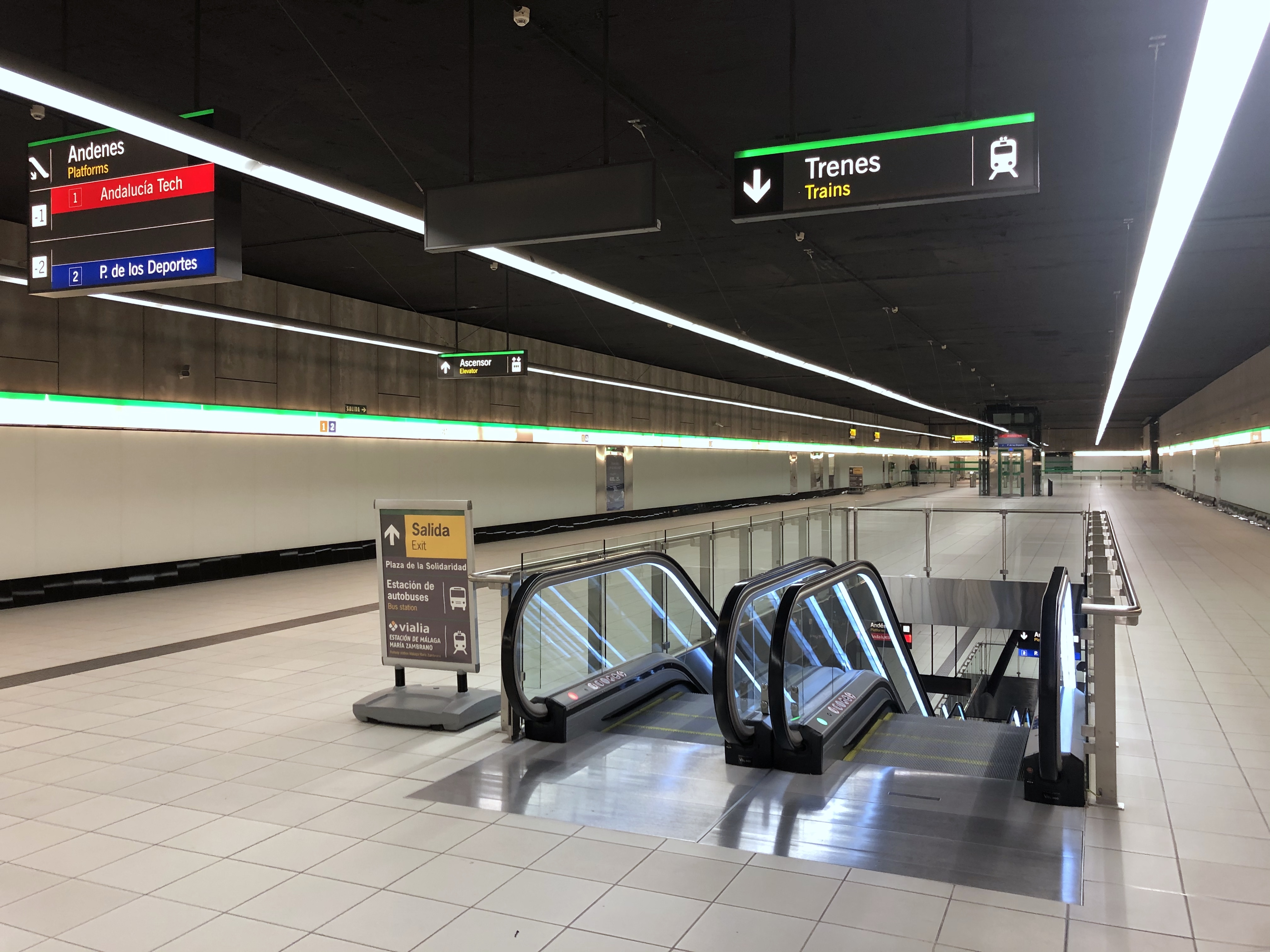
- Mezzanine of El Perchel station, with escalator leading down to the platforms

General information
- Location: Calle Explanada de la Estación, Málaga
- Coordinates: 36.7128°N 4.4324°W
- Owner: Málaga Metropolitan Transport Consortium
- Lines: Lines 1 & 2
- Tracks: 2
- Connections: Urban and suburban buses, Cercanías, Renfe

Construction
- Structure type: Underground station
- Parking: No
- Accessible: Yes

History
- Opened: 30 July 2014
Location

El Perchel is an underground station serving Lines 1 and 2 of the Málaga Metro. The station opened on 30 July 2014, and until 2023 was the city centre terminus for both lines.

== Services ==
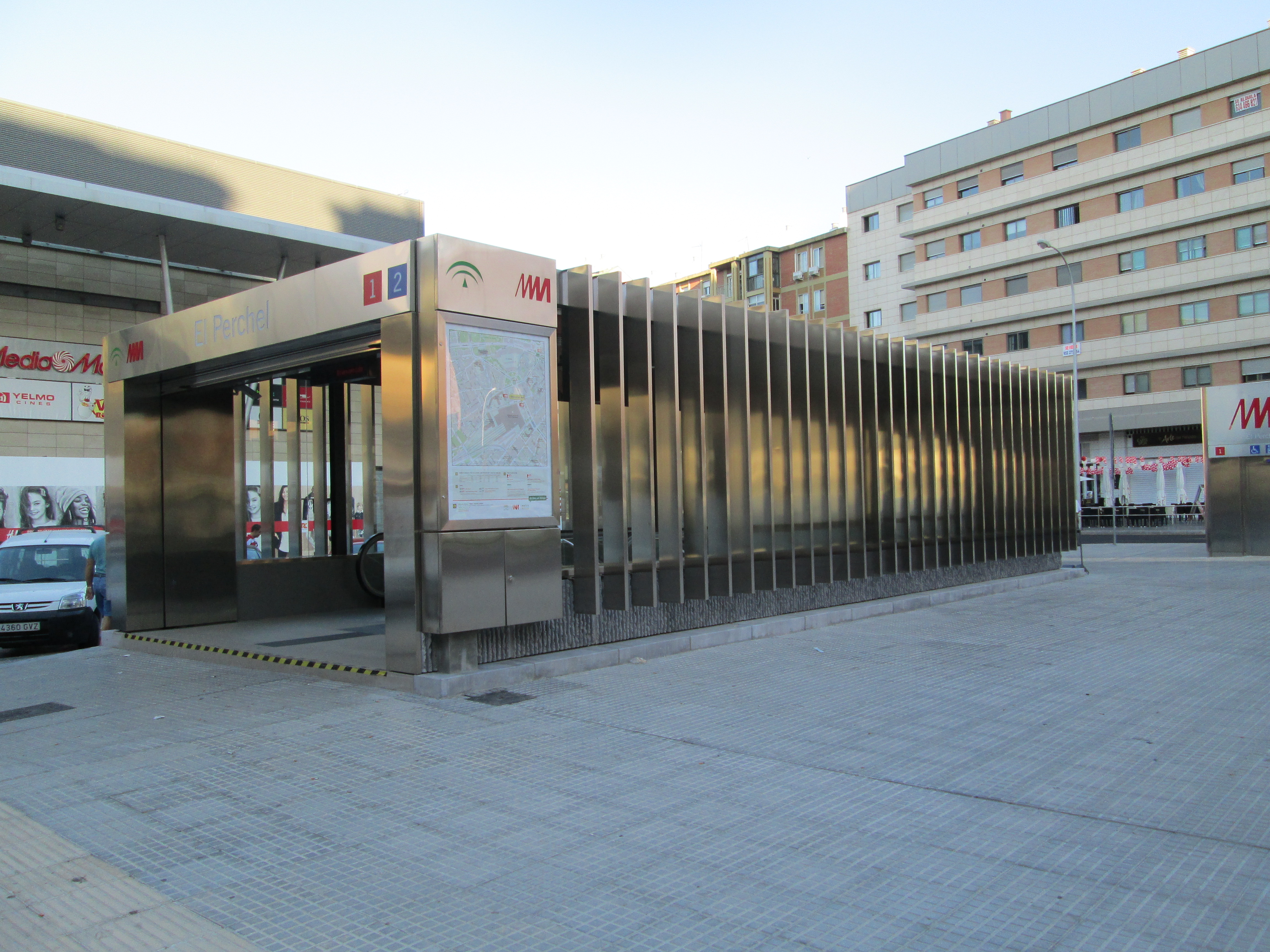
One of the ground level entrances to El Perchel station

At the metro's 2014 opening, El Perchel was a terminus station, and the only station serving both lines of the metro. Line 1 reaches Andalucia Tech, while Line 2 ends at Palacio de Deportes José María Martín Carpena. Entrances to El Perchel are located outside Málaga María Zambrano railway station, where AVE high-speed rail services, regional trains and local Cercanías trains to Fuengirola and Álora can be accessed.

In 2023, El Perchel became a through-station when the extension further into the city centre opened, serving two underground stops at Guadalmedina and Atarazanas.
