= La Carolina Park =

Public park in Quito, Ecuador

Coordinates: 0.1811°S 78.4842°W

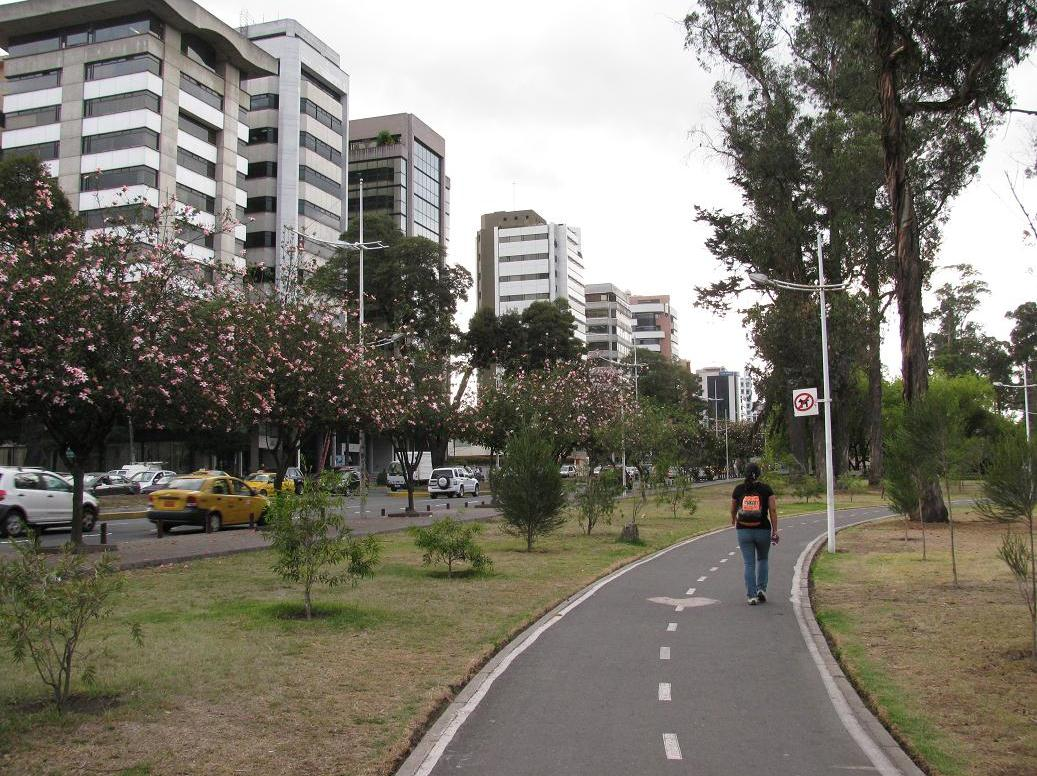
La Carolina Park next to Amazonas Avenue

Parque La Carolina is a 165.5-acre (670,000 m^{2}) park in the centre of the Quito central business district, bordered by the avenues Río Amazonas, de los Shyris, Naciones Unidas, Eloy Alfaro, and de la República. Iñaquito metro station is in the northern part of the park, whereas La Carolina metro station is in the southern part.

== History ==
This park started from the expropriation of the farm La Carolina in 1939. The design of the park was made by the Dirección Metropolitana de Planificación Territorial (DMPT). Pope John Paul II headed a great Catholic mass in the park during his visit to Ecuador in 1985, and a giant Christian cross has been built in this place.

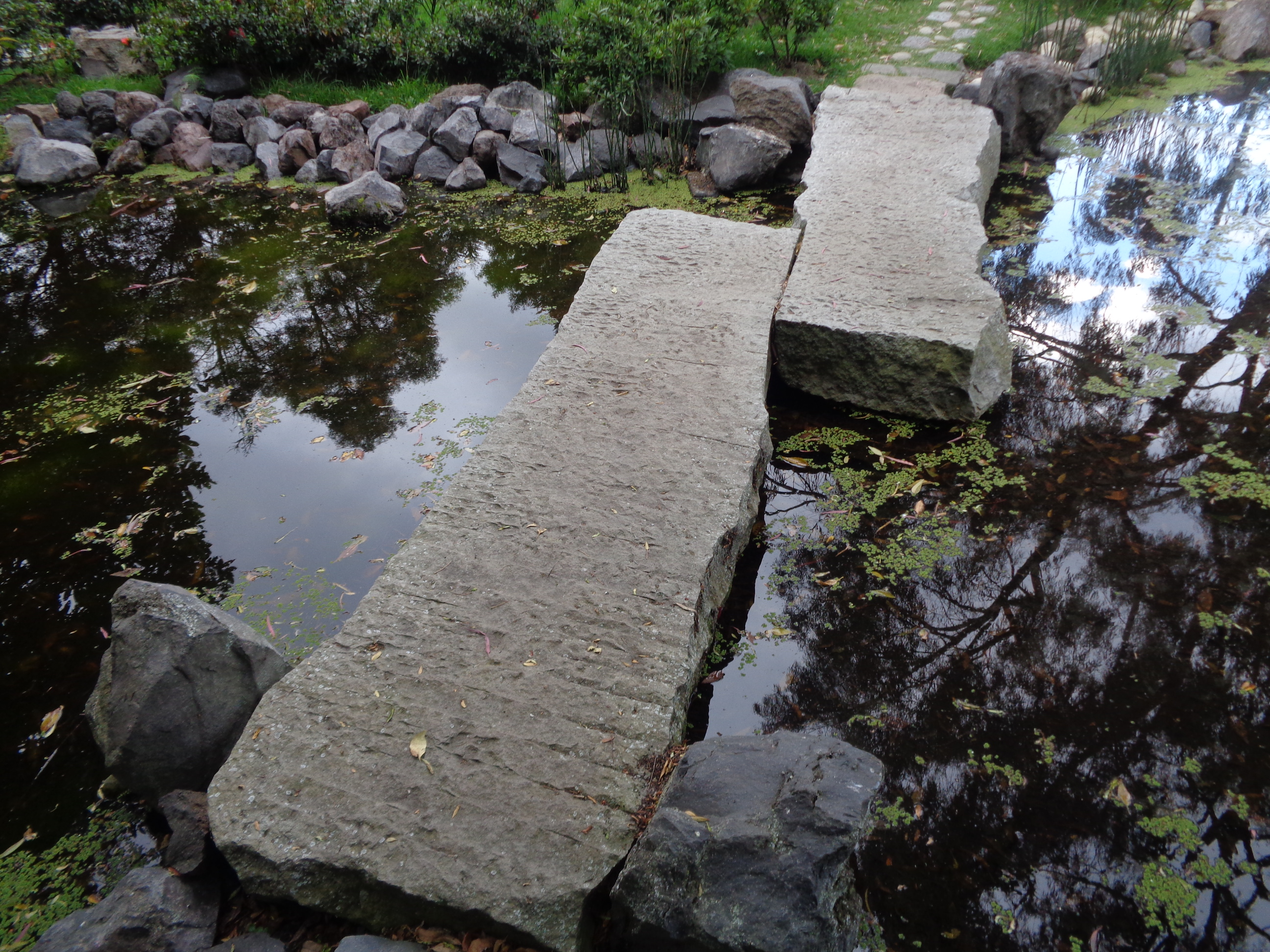
A zig-zag bridge across a small pond in Quito at the Quito Botanical Garden which is situated inside Parque La Carolina.

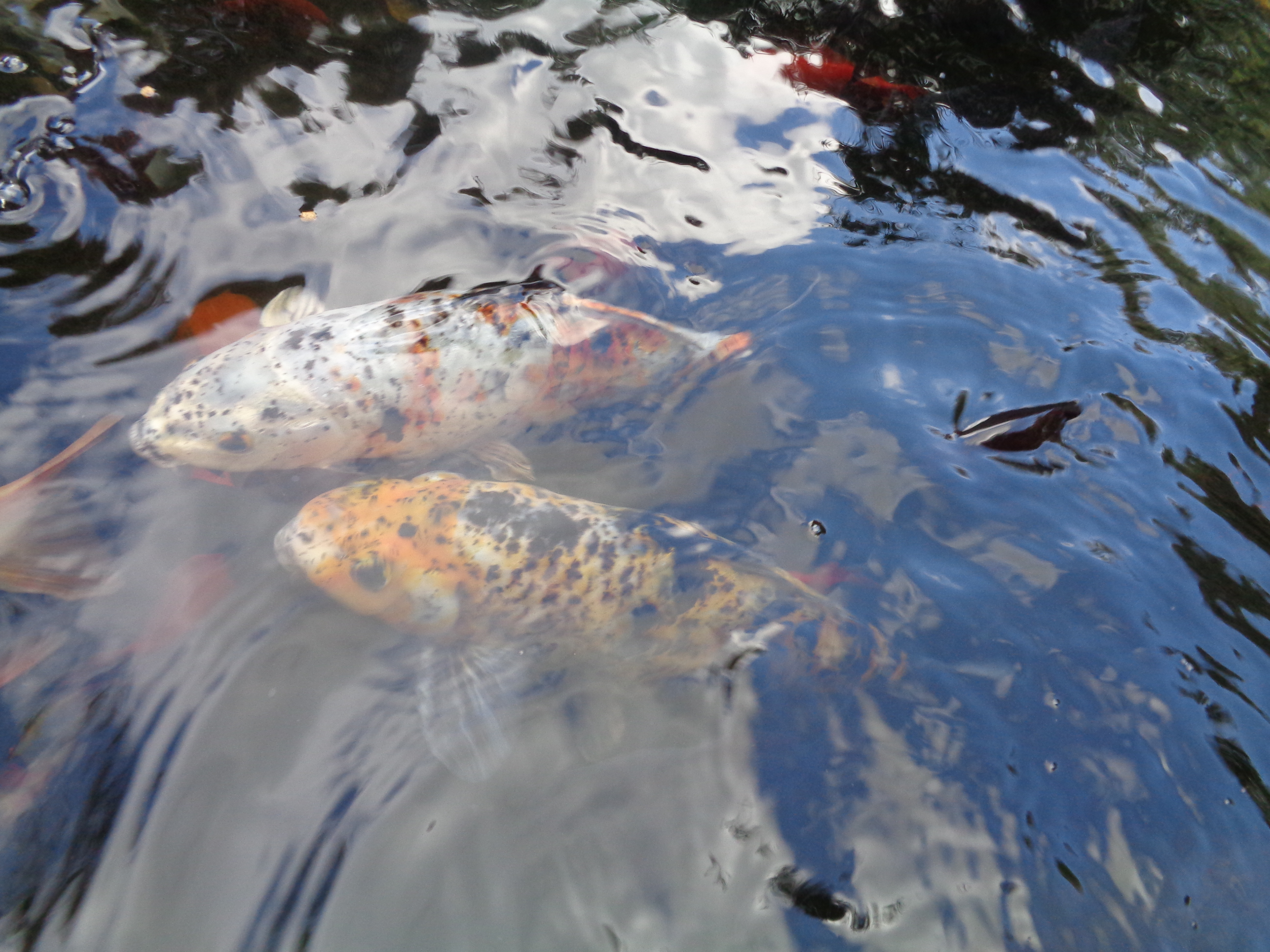
A Koi pond inside the Jardín Botánico de Quito.

== Usage ==
Quiteños gather at La Carolina mostly on weekends to play soccer, basketball, and ecua-volley, which is an Ecuadorian variation of volleyball with less emphasis on spiking, allowing more of a throw. Some of the other activities are aerobics, kite flying, running, snacking, and people watching. The southern part of the park has a small pond where paddle boats can be rented and a skatepark for bicyclists and skateboarders. Artists are known to perform on weekends at the park. In the western part of the park are the Quito Exhibition Center, the Quito botanical gardens, and a Vivarium.

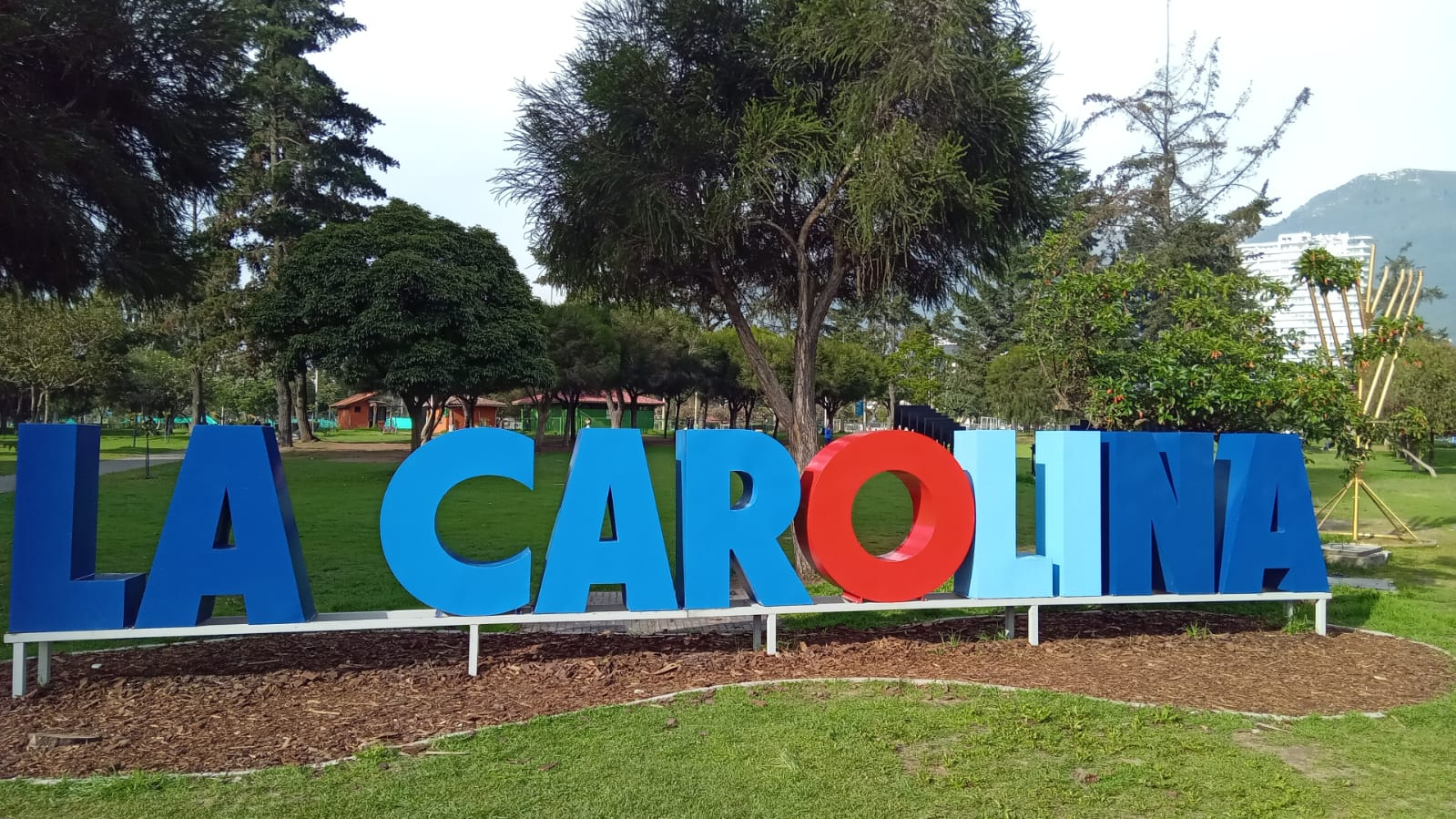
Parque La Carolina in 2025.

== See also ==
- Plaza de La Independencia
- Quito Botanical Garden
