= Jipijapa metro station =

Metro station in Quito, Ecuador

Estación Jipijapa
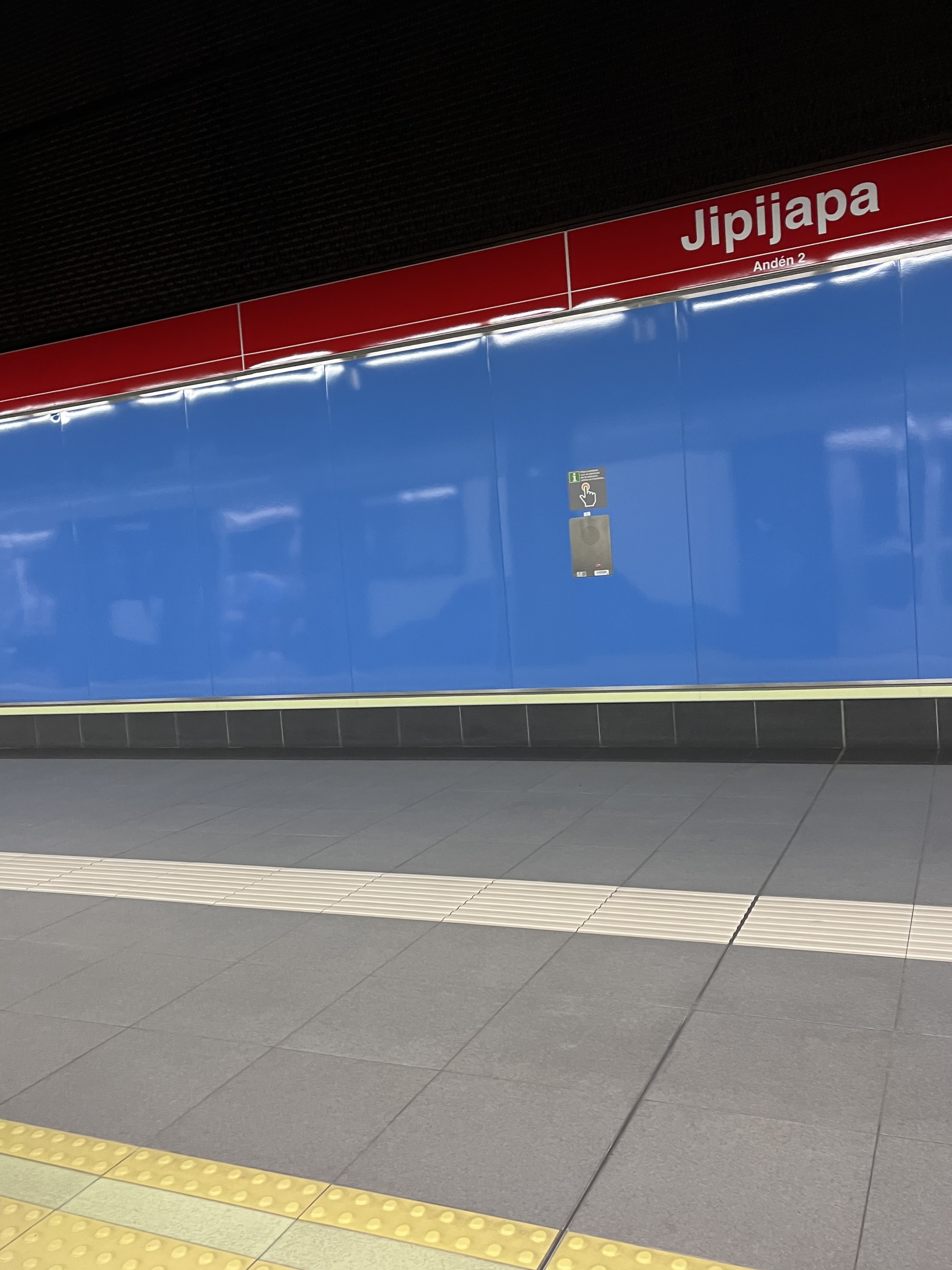

General information
- Location: Ecuador
- Coordinates: 0°09′51.4″S 78°29′0.6″W
- System: Quito Metro station
- Line: Line 1

Construction
- Accessible: yes

History
- Opened: 21 December 2022

Services
Preceding station	Quito Metro	Following station
Iñaquito toward Quitumbe	Line 1	El Labrador Terminus
Location

Jipijapa is a Quito Metro station. It was officially opened on 21 December 2022 as part of the inaugural section of the system between Quitumbe and El Labrador. The revenue service started on 2 May 2023 and stopped on 11 May 2023. It resumed on 1 December 2023. The station is located between El Labrador and Iñaquito.

This is an underground station. The number of daily passengers is an estimated 53,000. The station is handicap accessible and offers escalators. The station is painted in blue.

The station is located at the intersection of Avenida Amazonas, Avenida Juan de Ascaray, and Avenida Tomas de Berlanga, next to Plaza de Toros.

The construction was completed on March 31, 2021, after which the process of transfer of the station to the city was started, and the process was completed on 2 May 2021. On 23 January 2023, the first train with 600 passengers to whom invitations were extended arrived at the station.
