= Plaza de toros de Quito =

Bullring in Quito, Ecuador

Coordinates: 0°09′48″S 78°29′03″W

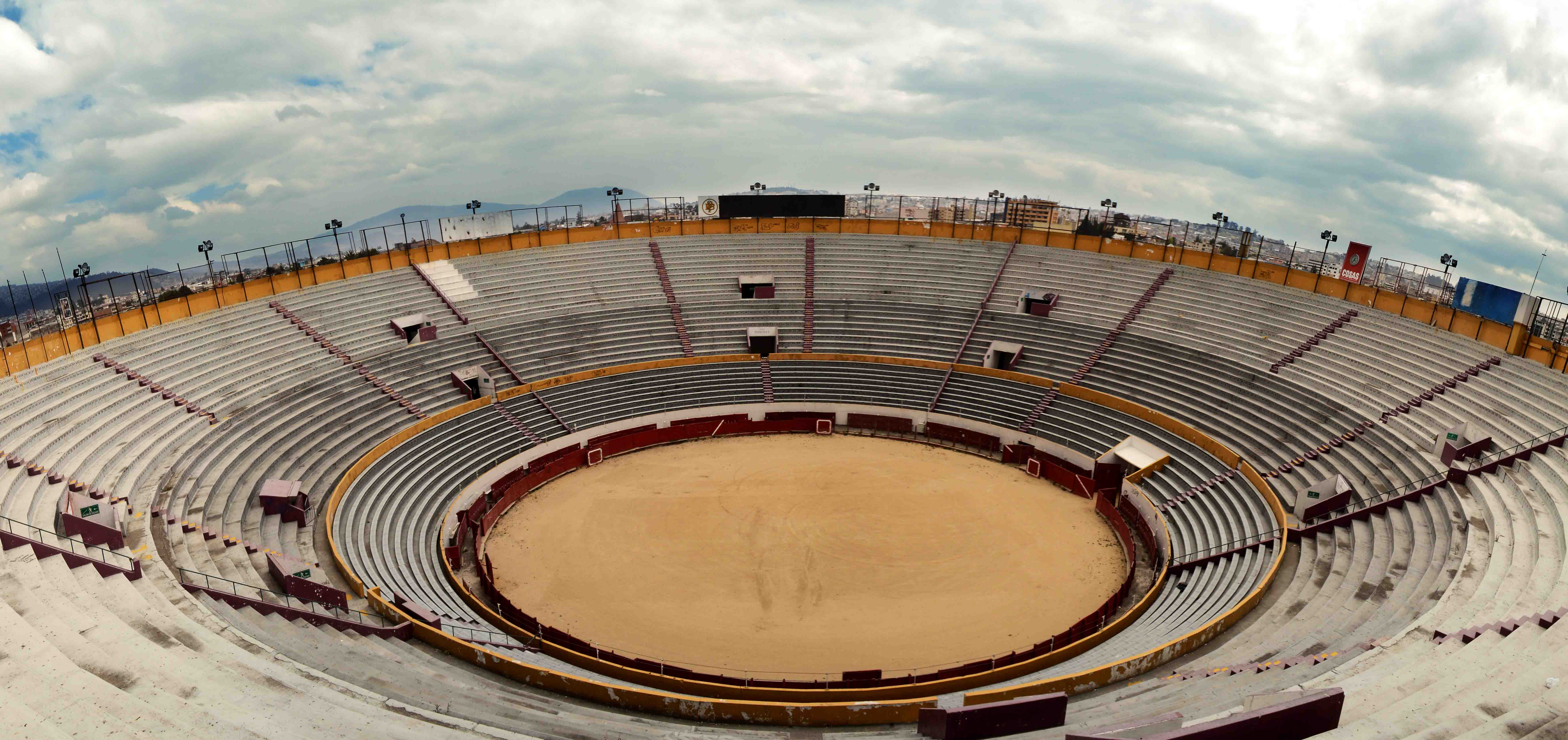
Plaza de toros de Quito pictured in 2014.

Plaza de toros de Quito is a bullring in Quito, Ecuador. It ceased to be used for bullfighting after a referendum in which the citizens of Quito voted against the legality of bullfighting. The stadium holds 15,000 people and it opened on 5 March 1960.

Jipijapa metro station is nearby.
