= Málaga Metro =

Transport network in Málaga, Spain

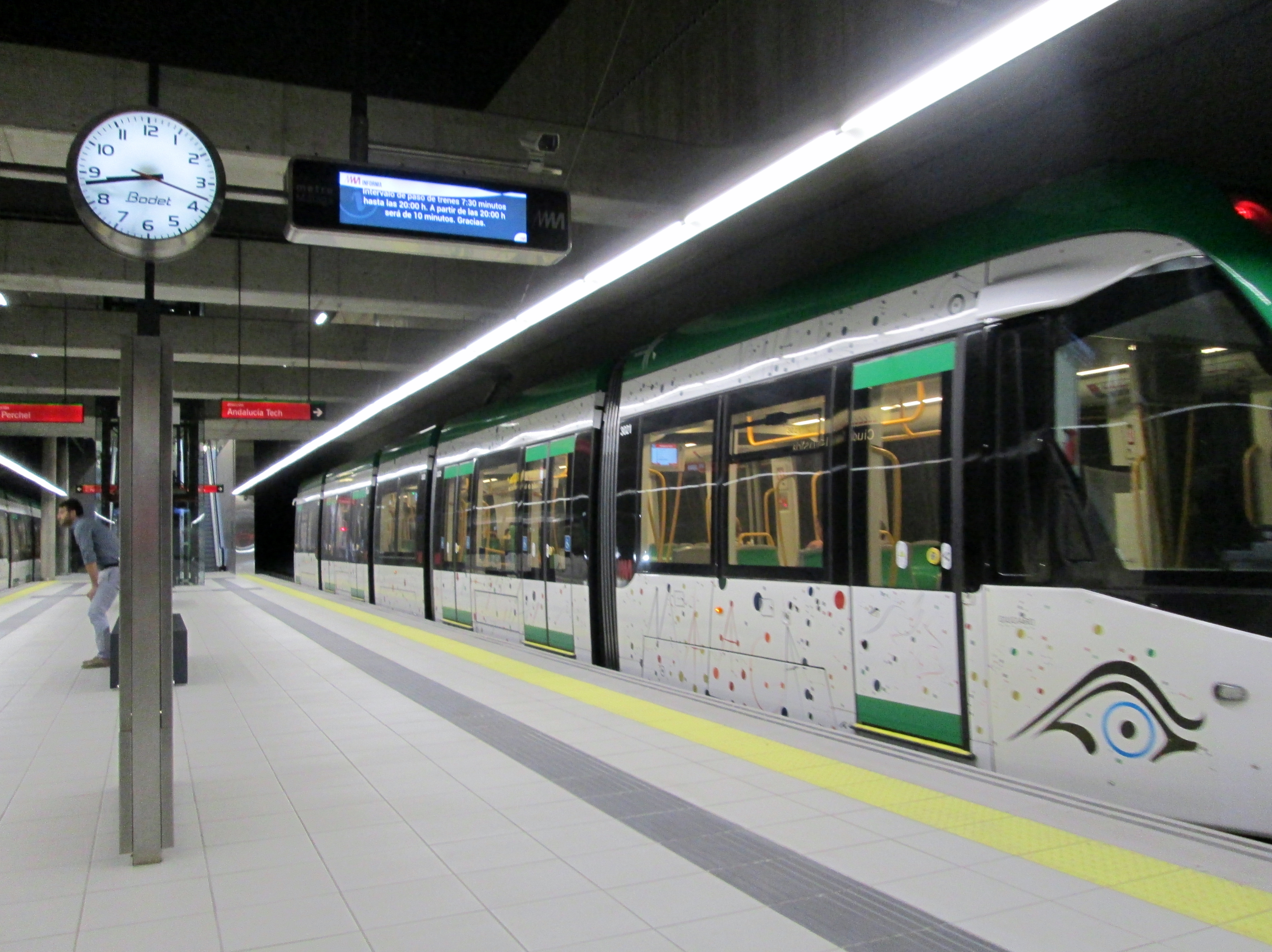
- Ciudad de la Justicia station

Overview
- Native name: Metro de Málaga
- Owner: Junta de Andalucía
- Locale: Málaga, Andalusia, Spain
- Transit type: Light rail
- Number of lines: 2 (operating); 4 (planned)
- Number of stations: 19
- Daily ridership: 52,665 daily (2025)
- Annual ridership: 19.2 million (2025)

Operation
- Began operation: 30 July 2014
- Operator: Agencia de Obra Pública de la Junta de Andalucía
- Number of vehicles: 18 CAF Urbos 3

Technical
- System length: 13.2 km (8.2 mi)
- Track gauge: 1,435 mm (4 ft 8 1/2 in) standard gauge
- Top speed: 70 km/h (43 mph)
System map

The Málaga Metro (Spanish: Metro de Málaga) is a light rail network in Málaga, Spain. Its two lines were inaugurated on 30 June 2014 and connect the city centre with the western suburbs. As of 2026, the network operates 13.2 km (8.2 mi) of route. There are 19 stations, 14 of which are underground while 5 are surface-level light rail stops.

The network's rolling stock consists of 18 Urbos 3 light rail vehicles (LRVs) manufactured by the Spanish company CAF. All vehicles are fully covered by CCTV and have air conditioning. Each one has a capacity of 226 people: 56 seated passengers and 170 standing. Both vehicles and stations are fully accessible for passengers with disabilities.

If Málaga Metro is considered a metro system, then it would be the second metro system to be built in Andalusia, after Seville Metro. Consequently, it would rank as the sixth-busiest metro system in Spain: it carried over 19 million passengers in 2025.

== History ==
The network was first proposed during the 1990s, as the city was suffering from severe traffic congestion. In 2001, the Ministry of Public Works and Transport commissioned a study about the feasibility of constructing an urban rail system in the area. The plan had four lines, radiating from the city centre, with stations roughly 500 m (1,640 ft) apart to allow a high level of accessibility. Funding for the project would come from both the local and the Spanish governments. The project was finally approved in April 2005, with construction starting in June 2006. Both lines were inaugurated on 30 July 2014.

On 27 March 2023, the system's first expansion was inaugurated, connecting El Perchel station to the historic centre of the city. This expansion is 1.7 km (1.1 mi) long and has two stations: Guadalmedina (which services both lines) and Atarazanas (servicing Line 1). These stations were supposed to be built and inaugurated in 2014 along the rest of the system, but were delayed due to the 2008 financial crisis that severely struck the region. This first expansion resulted in the increase of the metro's daily ridership from 28,000 to 41,000 on its first operating day, and helped the system reach its goal of 18 million users that year.

Another expansion for Line 2 is currently under construction, connecting Guadalmedina Station to Malaga's Hospital Civil. Originally this extension was planned to be at surface level, similar to the West end of line 1. This new underground section will be 1.8 km (1.1 mi) long, with 3 more stations to be built: Hilera, La Trinidad and Hospital. Construction began in May 2024, and is expected to be finished by 2027.

There have been several plans to expand the system to the east, to the El Palo district, and to the north, to the Ciudad Jardín district, (as Line 3 and 4 respectively). However, these projects have been ruled out due to cost and the risk of damaging archaeological remains.

== Network ==
=== Lines ===
Line	Termini		Length	Stations	Avg. distance between stations (m)
Málaga Metro	Atarazanas	Andalucía Tech	7.5 km (4.7 mi)	13	639
Málaga Metro	Guadalmedina	Palacio de los Deportes	5.7 km (3.5 mi)	8	696
Total:			13.2 km (8.2 mi)	21	

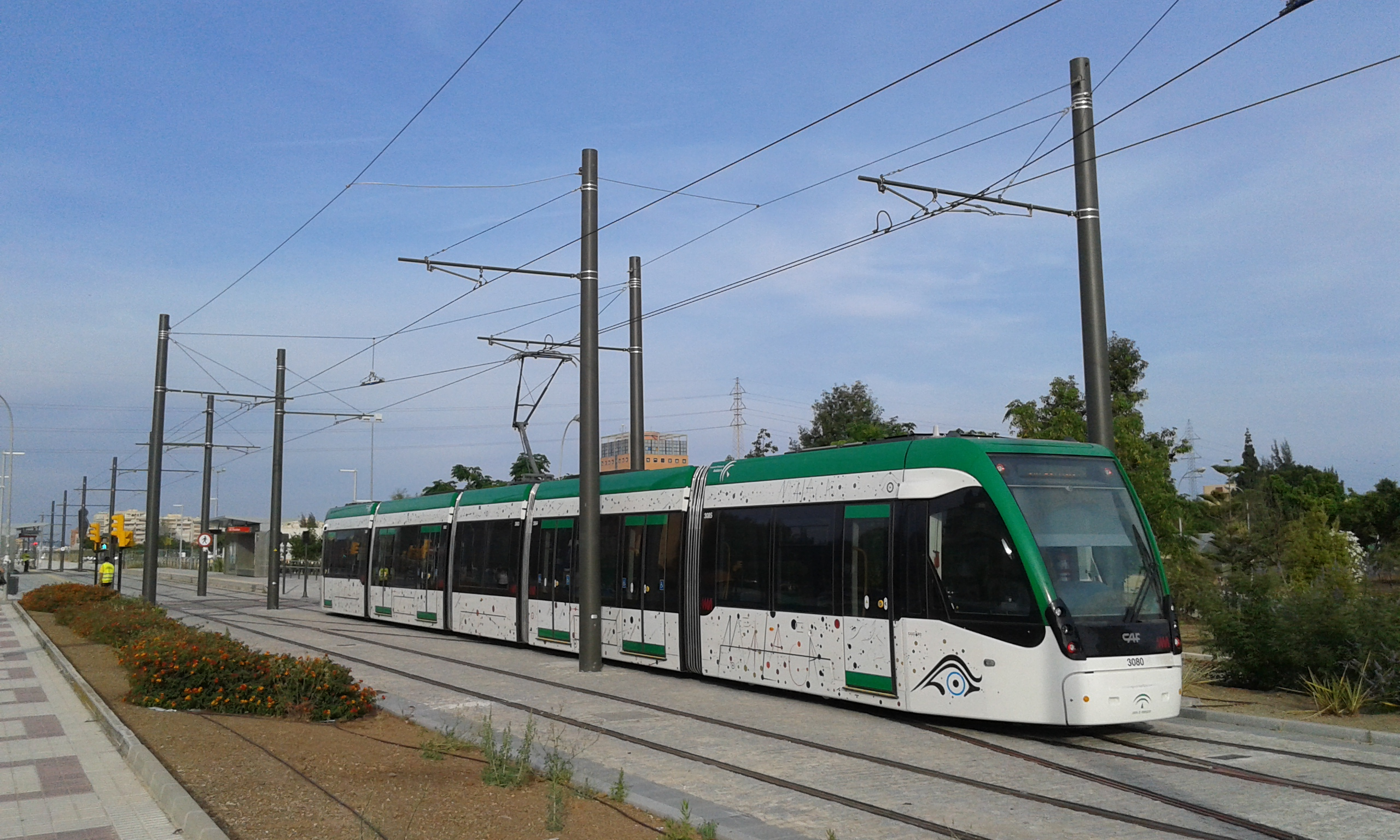
Tram near the University tram stop.

=== Route ===
Both lines run underground in the city centre. Line 1 goes from there to the University of Málaga. Between Universidad station and the Andalucía Tech terminus, it runs on the surface, which includes some at-grade intersections.

An extension of Line 1 from El Perchel further into the city centre with two underground stops, Guadalmedina and Atarazanas, opened on 27 March 2023.
