= Guadalmedina (Málaga Metro) =

Underground railway station in Spain

Guadalmedina

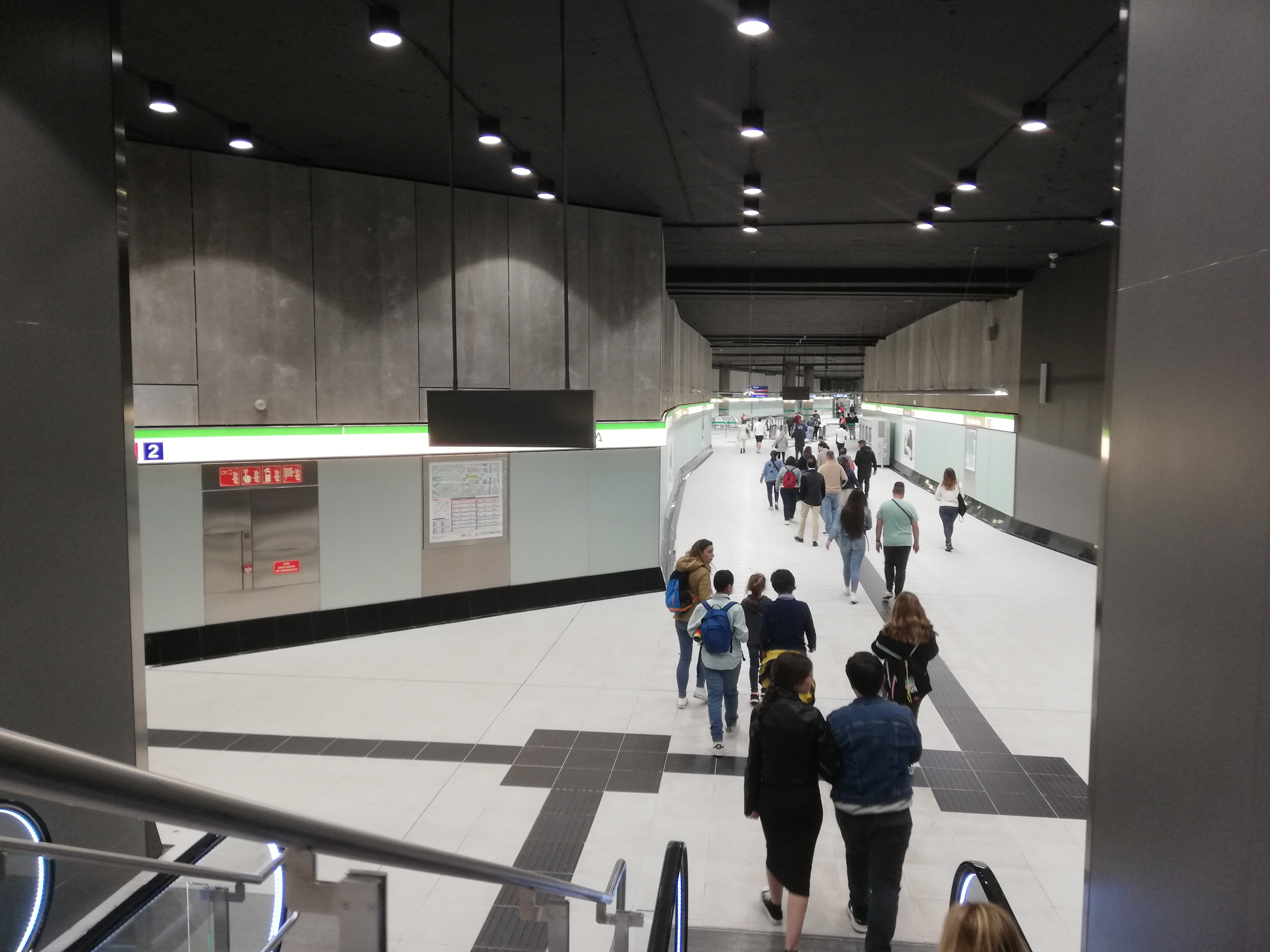

General information
- Coordinates: 36.7160°N 4.4297°W
- Owner: Málaga Metropolitan Transport Consortium
- Lines: Lines 1 & 2
- Connections: Urban and suburban buses

Construction
- Structure type: Underground station
- Parking: No
- Accessible: Yes

History
- Opened: 27 March 2023
Location

Guadalmedina is an underground station serving Lines 1 and 2 of the Málaga Metro in Andalusia, Spain. It opened on 27 March 2023, serving Málaga city centre, and is the largest metro station in Andalusia, at 2,800 square metres in size.

== Services ==
Guadalmedina station is served by Line 1 of the metro, from Andalucia Tech to Atarazanas; and Line 2 as the terminus of the line from Palacio de los Deportes. In the future, Guadalmedina will be linked to Hospital Civil.
