= Quito Metro =

Rapid transit system in Quito, Ecuador

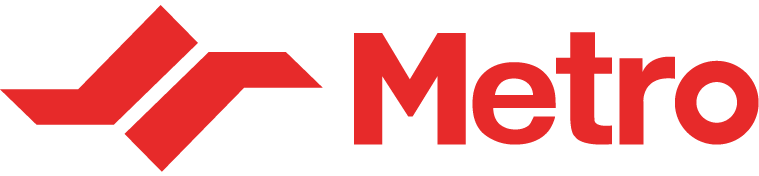

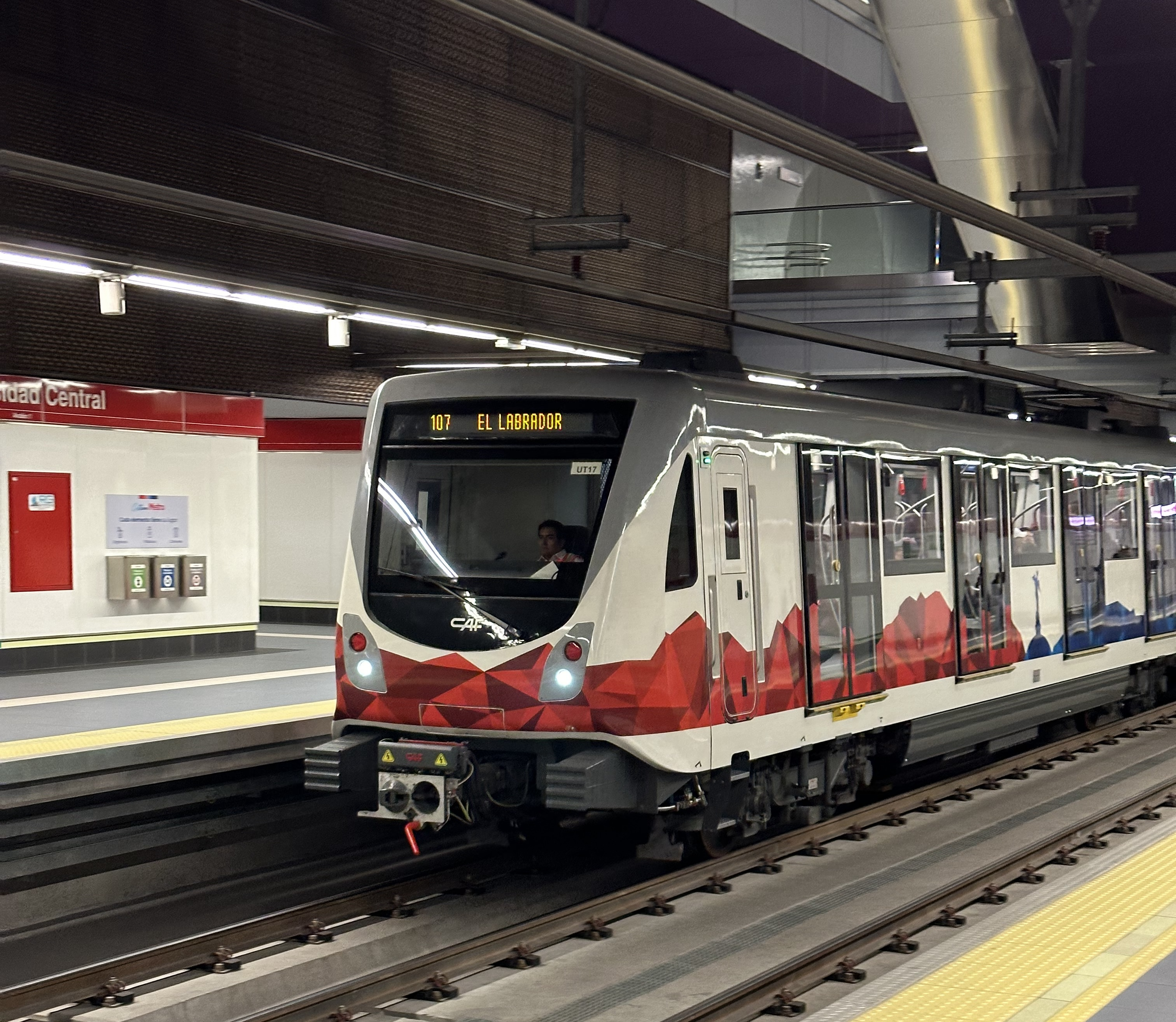
- Train arriving at Universidad Central station

Overview
- Native name: Metro de Quito
- Locale: Quito, Pichincha, Ecuador
- Transit type: Rapid transit
- Number of lines: 1
- Number of stations: 15
- Daily ridership: 350,000 (projected)
- Website: Metro de Quito (in Spanish)

Operation
- Began operation: 1 December 2023; 2 years ago
- Operator: Empresa Pública Metropolitana Metro de Quito
- Character: underground
- Number of vehicles: 18

Technical
- System length: 22.6 km (14.0 mi)
- No. of tracks: 2
- Track gauge: 1,435 mm (4 ft 8 1/2 in) standard gauge
- Electrification: 1,500 V DC overhead wire
- Average speed: 37 kilometres per hour (23 mph)
System map

The Quito Metro (Spanish: Metro de Quito), abbreviated as MDQ, is a rapid transit system consisting of a single line in Quito, the capital of Ecuador.

The Metro is part of Quito's long-term effort to improve public transportation and reduce traffic congestion. It integrates with other systems such as the Ecovía and Trolebús, and is operated by the municipal company Empresa Pública Metropolitana Metro de Quito.

== History ==
Planning began in the late 2000s as part of a mobility master plan for the city. Construction started in 2013 and included tunnel boring and excavation through the historic center. The tunnels were completed by 2019. Construction of the metro line itself began in January 2016. The metro was projected to be operational by August 2020, but the opening was delayed numerous times.

The total cost of the project was estimated at US$2 billion. Funding was provided by multiple international institutions, including the Inter-American Development Bank (IDB), the World Bank, the European Investment Bank, and CAF.

The official inauguration was held on 21 December 2022, and commercial service started with some tests with passengers on 2 May 2023. After technical problems plagued the launch, service was shut down on 11 May. Later that year, the Quito metro initiated its commercial operations on 1 December 2023.

== Operations ==
Service runs approximately every 5 to 10 minutes. The full journey from Quitumbe to El Labrador takes about 34 minutes. The system uses a contactless fare card integrated with the city’s bus networks.

== Network and stations ==
=== Lines ===
Line 1 connects the southern terminal at Quitumbe with the northern station at El Labrador, spanning 22.6 km entirely underground. It has 15 stations and is the backbone of the city's rapid transit system.

=== Stations ===
The system's first line, which includes 15 stations, extends from Quitumbe in the south of the city to El Labrador in the north of the city. The 15 stations on this line are, from south to north:

Image	Station	Neighborhood	Connections	Serves
	Quitumbe	Quitumbe	Southern intercity bus terminal	
	Morán Valverde	Chillogallo	Urban buses	
	Solanda	Solanda	Feeder bus lines	
	Cardenal de la Torre	Chimbacalle	Trolleybus	
	El Recreo	La Magdalena	Ecovía	
	La Magdalena	La Magdalena	Local buses	
	San Francisco	Historic Center		Tourist zone
	La Alameda	Itchimbía	Trolleybus	
	El Ejido	Mariscal	Trolleybus	Universities
	Universidad Central	Universidad		Central University of Ecuador
	Pradera	Iñaquito		Business and hotel district
	La Carolina	Iñaquito		Carolina Park, shopping centers
	Iñaquito	Iñaquito		Public offices
	Jipijapa	Jipijapa		Local buses
	El Labrador	El Labrador	Planned intermodal terminal	

The station at Plaza de San Francisco (by the San Francisco monastery), is the only station placed in the historic center of Quito (declared a World Heritage Site by UNESCO in 1978). Due to archaeological remains found at the proposed site of the San Francisco station in late 2016, the station was moved two blocks further south to the Plaza 24th of May, and the remains will not be disturbed further.

Every station is painted in a distinct color to help with passenger orientation.

The design of Line 1 allows for five infill stations to be built if demand warrants, and for a potential 5 km extension northwards to the Ofelia bus terminal.

== Rolling stock ==
Line 1 operates 18 trains manufactured by CAF. Each train has six cars and can carry up to 1,500 passengers. The trains are equipped with air conditioning, CCTV, and accessibility features.
