= Aeropuerto metro station =

Panama metro station

Estación Aeropuerto
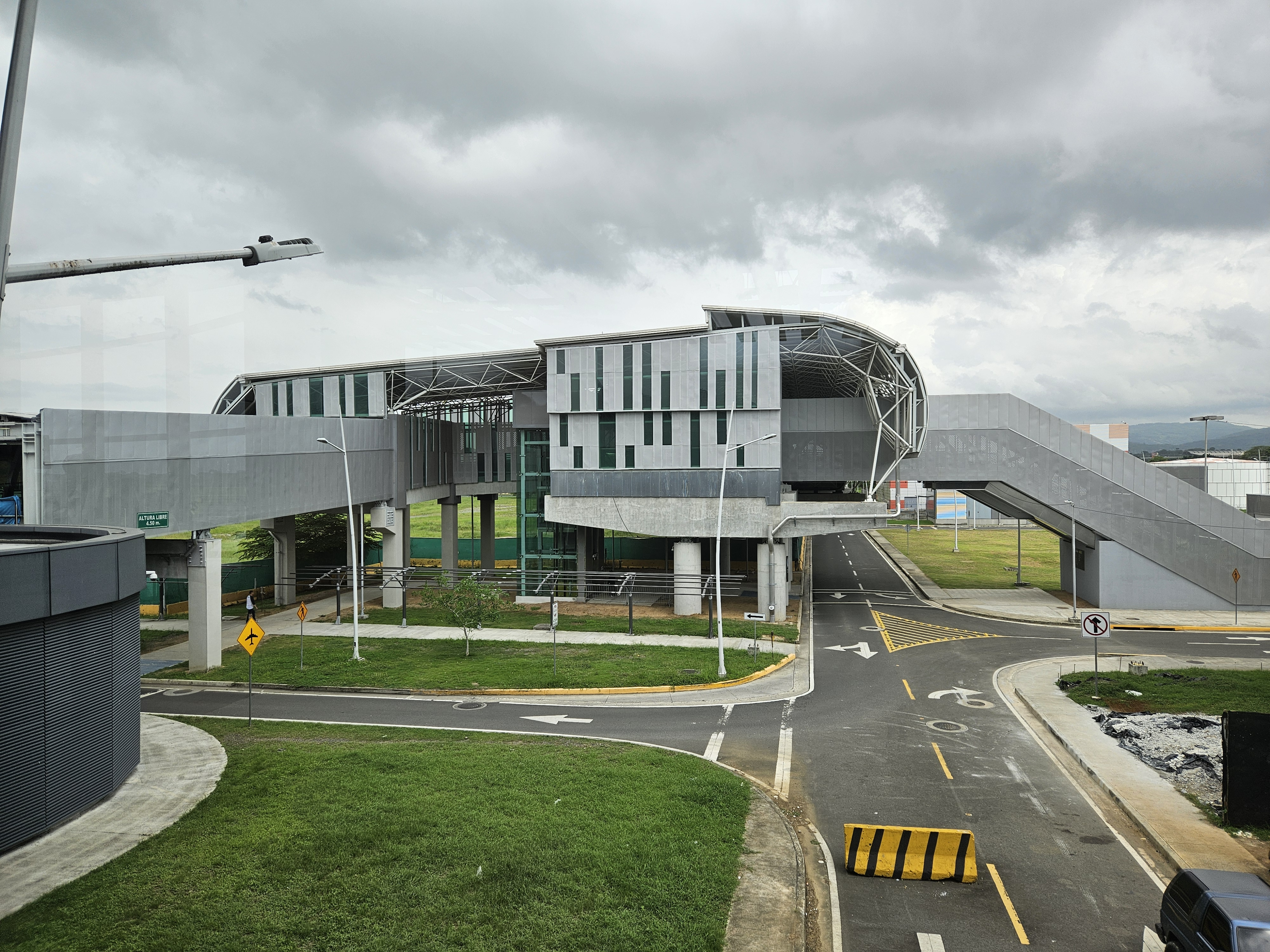
- Aeropuerto station, as seen from Tocumen International Airport, May 2025

General information
- Location: Tocumen International Airport; Panama City; Panama
- Coordinates: 9°03′57″N 79°23′22″W
- Platforms: 1 side platform
- Tracks: 1
- Connections: MiBus: E489; Interterminal Shuttle

Construction
- Structure type: Elevated
- Parking: Paid parking nearby

History
- Opened: 16 March 2023

Services
Preceding station	Panama Metro	Following station
ITSE toward Corredor Sur	Line 2 Branch	Terminus
Location

Aeropuerto station is a Panama Metro station serving Tocumen International Airport. It is the eastern terminus of El Ramal Line 2 (lit. 'Line 2 Branch') and opened on 16 March 2023 as part of a two-station extension of Line 2 from Corredor Sur. El Ramal Line 2 operates as a shuttle service, with trains terminating at Corredor Sur and no through service to the main Line 2 route.
