= Line 16 (Xi'an Metro) =

Metro line in Xi'an, China

- 16
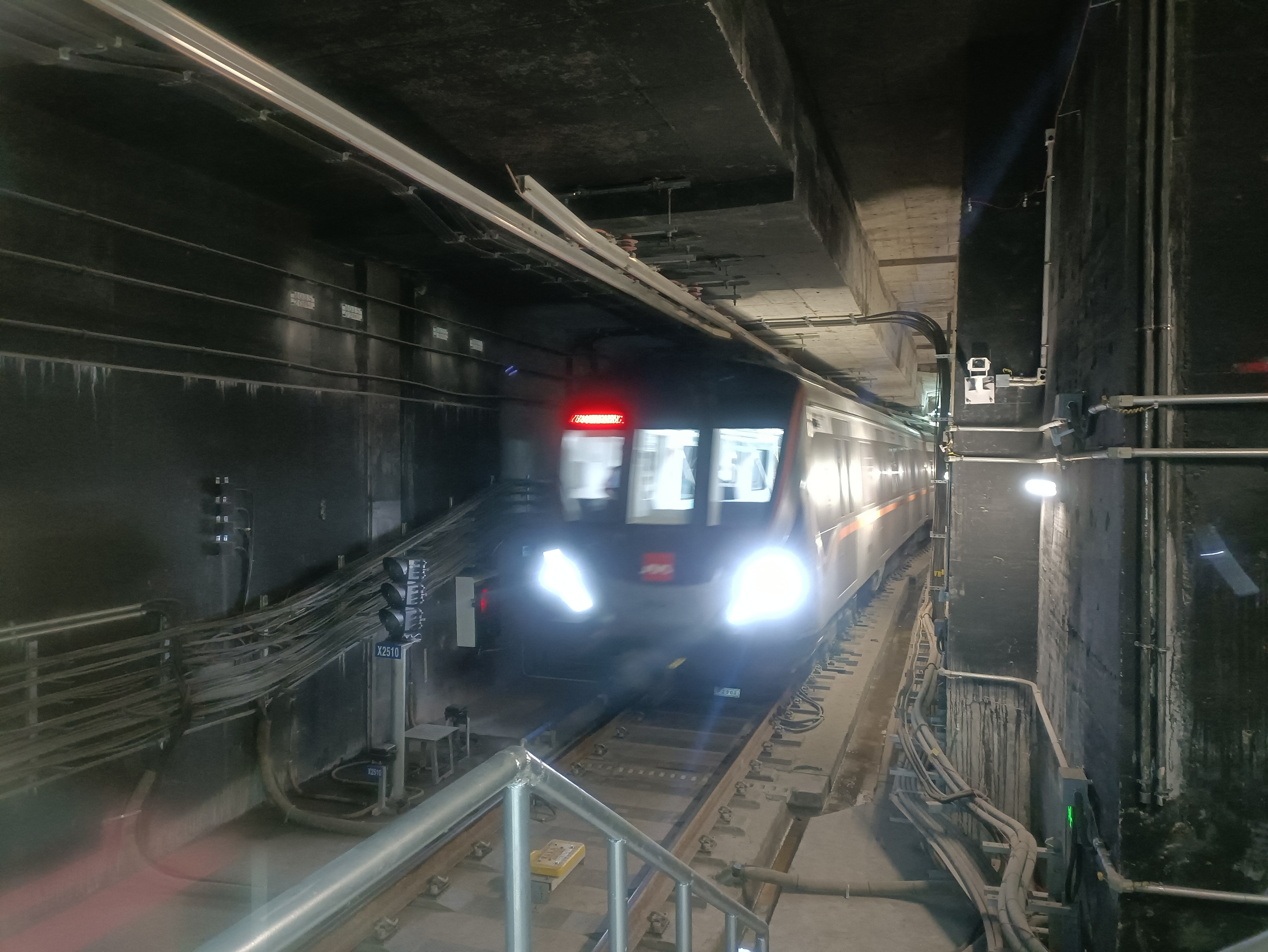
- A train of Xi'an Metro Line 16

Overview
- Status: Operational
- Owner: Xi'an Rail Transit Group
- Termini: Qinchuangyuanzhongxin; Shijingli
- Stations: 9 (Phase 1)

Service
- Type: Rapid transit
- System: Xi'an Metro
- Operator(s): Xi'an Metro Corporation
- Rolling stock: CRRC Changchun CCD5066 (Type B)

History
- Opened: 27 June 2023; 2 years ago

Technical
- Line length: 15.03 km (9.34 mi) (Phase 1)
- Number of tracks: 2
- Character: Underground
- Track gauge: 1,435 mm (4 ft 8 1/2 in)

Line 16 of the Xi'an Metro (Chinese: 西安地铁16号线; pinyin: Xī'ān Dìtiě Shíliù Hàoxiàn) is a rapid transit line in Xi'an, Shaanxi Province, China. The line is 15.03 km (9.34 mi) long with 9 stations. Phase 1 of Line 16 opened on 27 June 2023.

== History ==
On 12 June 2019, Line 16 (Phase 1) was approved by National Development and Reform Commission.

On 13 December 2019, construction of Line 16 (Phase 1) officially started.

On 16 March 2022, the station names for Line 16 (Phase 1) were officially announced.

Phase 1 of Line 16 opened on 27 June 2023.

== Stations (north to south) ==
Station name		Connections
English	Chinese	Connections
Qinchuangyuanzhongxin	秦创原中心	
Xixiandasha	西咸大厦	
Shanglinlu	上林路	1
Fuxingdadaobei	复兴大道北	
Xi'anguojizuqiuzhongxin	西安国际足球中心	
Xiliuying	细柳营	
Fengdongchengshiguangchang	沣东城市广场	
Huanlegu	欢乐谷	5
Shijingli	诗经里	
