= Qinchuangyuanzhongxin station =

Metro station in Xi'an, China

Qinchuangyuanzhongxin 秦创原中心
- Station platform

Chinese name
- Traditional Chinese: 秦創原中心
- Simplified Chinese: 秦创原中心
- Literal meaning: Qinchuangyuan Center
Transcriptions
Standard Mandarin
- Hanyu Pinyin: Qínchuàngyuán zhōngxīn
- Wade–Giles: Ch‘in^{2}-ch‘uang^{4}-yüan^{2} chung^{1}-hsin^{1}
- IPA: [tɕʰǐn.ʈʂʰwàŋ.ɥɛ̌n ʈʂʊ́ŋ.ɕín]

General information
- Location: Qindu District, Xi'an, Shaanxi; China
- Coordinates: 34.3389°N 108.7819°E
- Operator: Xi'an Metro Co. Ltd.
- Line: Line 16
- Platforms: 2 (1 island platform)

Construction
- Structure type: Underground

History
- Opened: 27 June 2023

Services
Preceding station	Xi'an Metro	Following station
Terminus	Line 16	Xixiandasha towards Shijingli
Location

Qinchuangyuanzhongxin station (Chinese: 秦创原中心站) is a station of Line 16 of the Xi'an Metro located in Xi'an's Qindu District. It started operations on 27 June 2023.
