= El Labrador metro station =

Quito metro station

Estación El Labrador
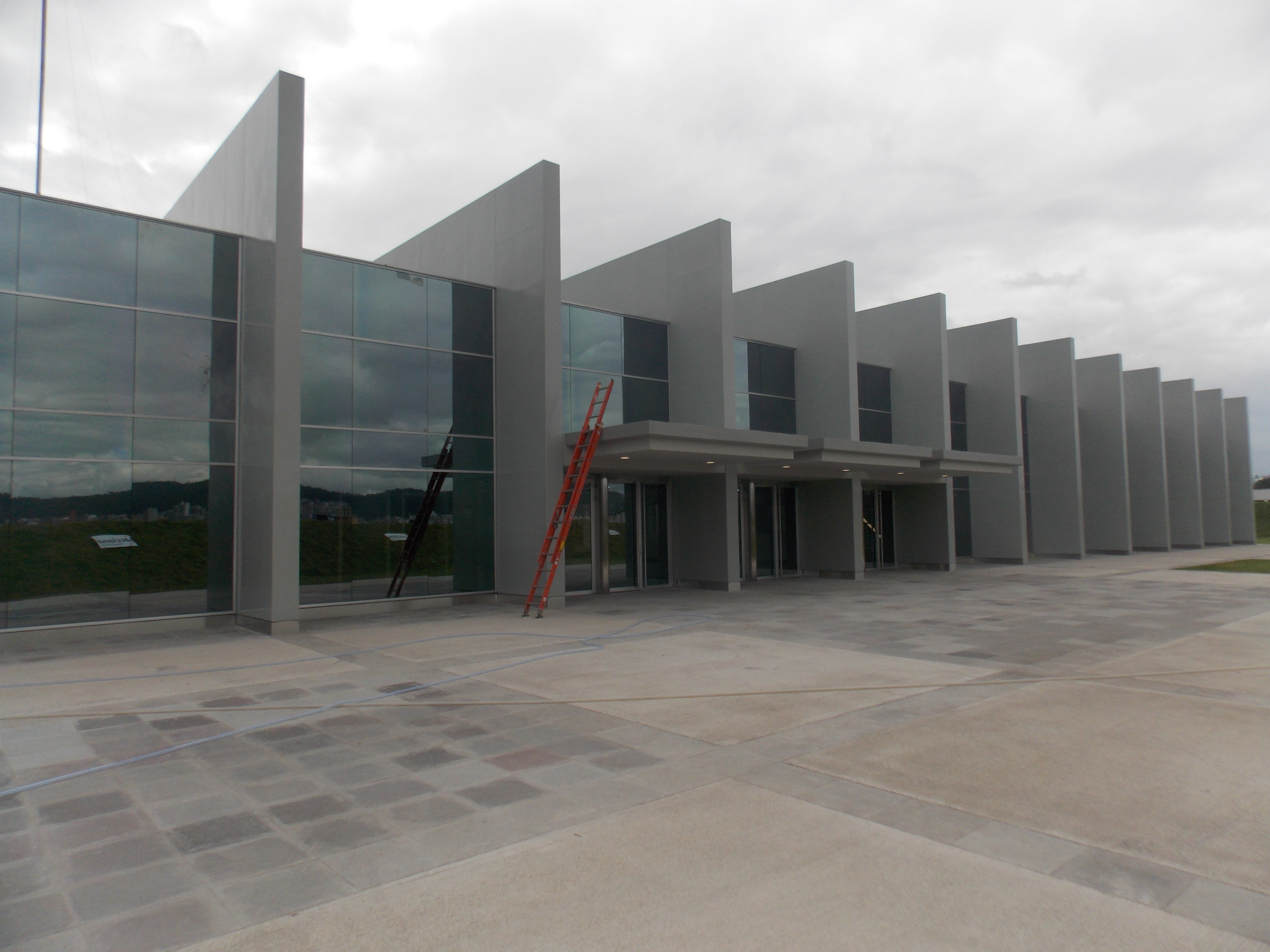
- Exterior of the station

General information
- Location: Ecuador
- Coordinates: 0°09′13.0″S 78°29′10.4″W
- System: Quito Metro station
- Line: Line 1

Construction
- Accessible: yes

History
- Opened: 21 December 2022

Services
Preceding station	Quito Metro	Following station
Jipijapa toward Quitumbe	Line 1	Terminus
Location

El Labrador is a Quito Metro station. It was officially opened on 21 December 2022 as the northern terminus of the inaugural section of the system between Quitumbe and El Labrador. The revenue service started on 2 May 2023 and stopped on 11 May 2023. It resumed on 1 December 2023. The adjacent station is Jipijapa.

It is an underground station, located 9 m below the surface.

The station is located on Calle Isaac Albéniz, next to the eponymous transport terminal. The entrance to the metro station is integrated with the entrances to the bus and trolleybus stations of the terminal. This is one of five such integrated stations of the first stretch of Quito Metro. It has access for disabled passengers.

The first train arrived at the station on 30 October 2020, during the trial phase. On 23 January 2023, the first train with 600 passengers to whom invitations were extended arrived.
