= Quitumbe metro station =

Quito metro station

Estación Quitumbe

General information
- Location: Ecuador
- Coordinates: 0°17′43.7″S 78°33′18.2″W
- System: Quito Metro station
- Line: Line 1

History
- Opened: 21 December 2022

Services
Preceding station	Quito Metro	Following station
Terminus	Line 1	Morán Valverde toward El Labrador
Location

Quitumbe is a Quito Metro station. It was officially opened on 21 December 2022 as the southern terminal of the inaugural section of the system, between Quitumbe and El Labrador. The revenue service started on 2 May 2023 and stopped on 11 May 2023. It resumed on 1 December 2023. The adjacent station is Morán Valverde.

This is an underground station. It is located below Avenida Condor Ñan, next to a large ground transportation terminal.

On 23 January 2023, the first train with 600 passengers to whom invitations were extended arrived at the station.
