= Cercanías Málaga =

Cercanías network in Malaga

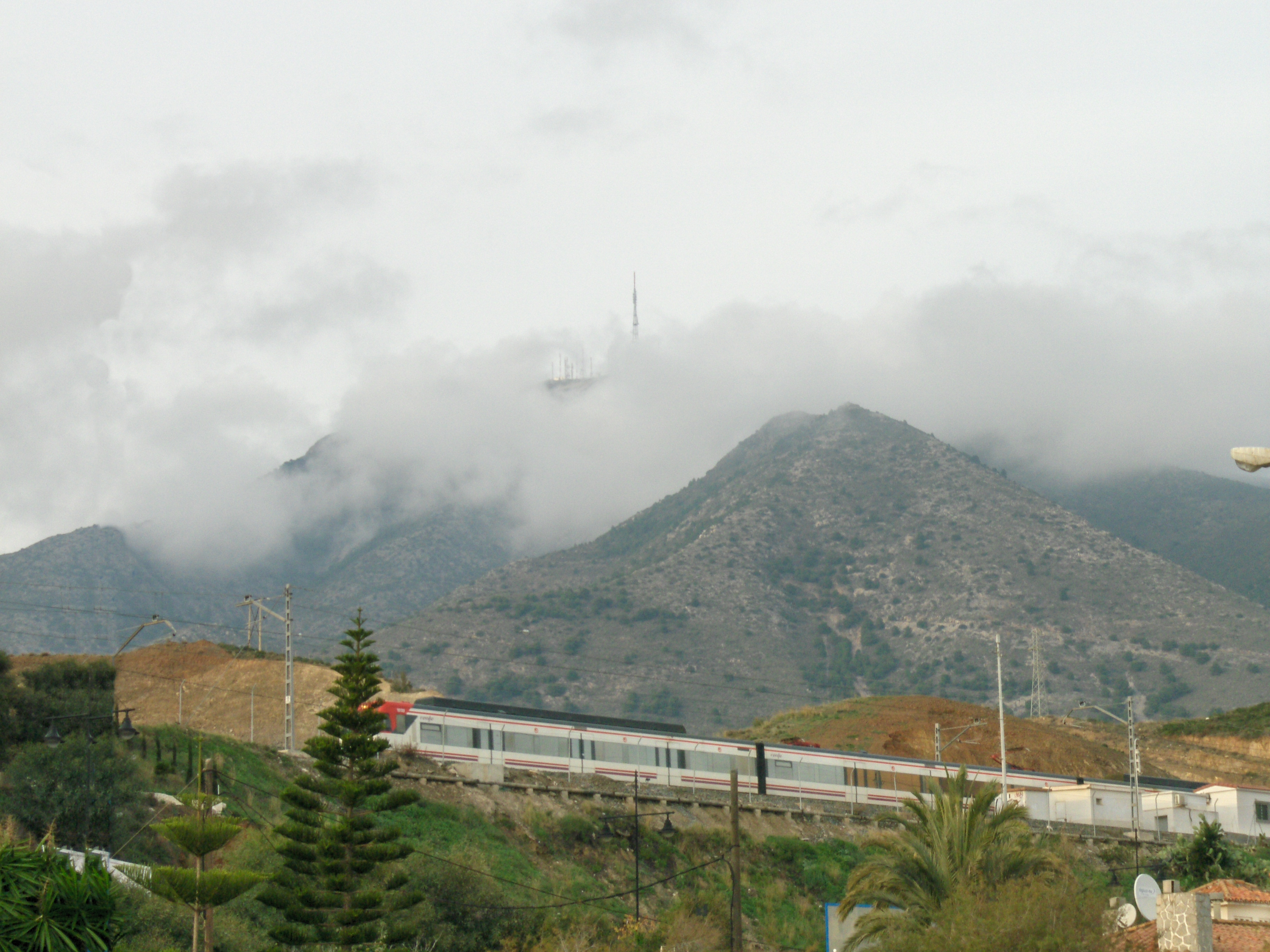

Overview
- Locale: Málaga, Spain
- Transit type: Commuter rail
- Number of lines: 2
- Number of stations: 23
- Annual ridership: 11.469 million (2018)

Operation
- Began operation: 1975
- Operator: Renfe

Technical
- System length: 70 km (43.50 mi)
- Track gauge: 1,668 mm (5 ft 5 21/32 in) (Iberian gauge)
- Electrification: Overhead lines
System map
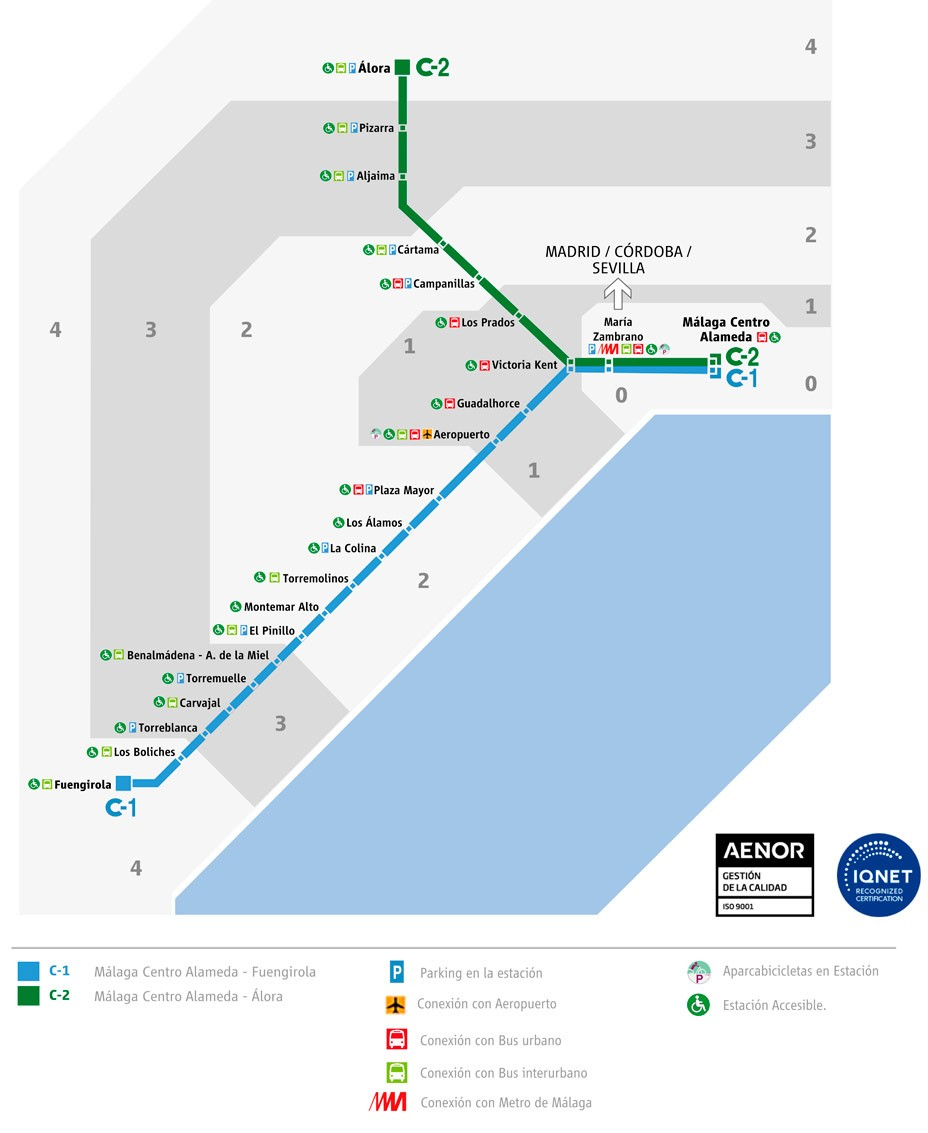

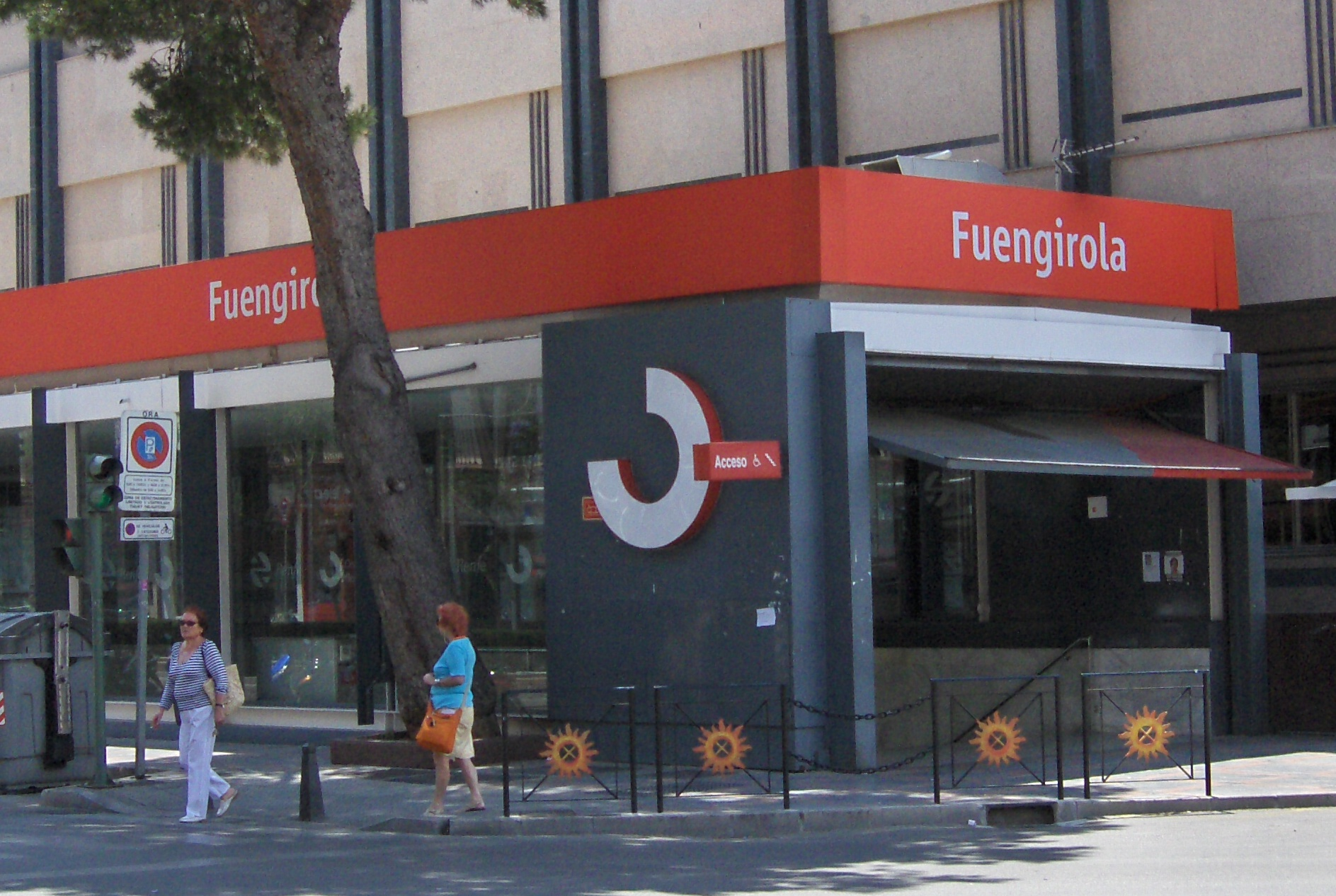
Estación de Fuengirola.

Cercanías Málaga is a commuter rail service between central Málaga, Spain, and towns in the province. The network consists of 70 kilometres (43 mi) of track, with two lines and 23 stations in operation. The trains are powered by overhead lines and run on broad Iberian gauge track.

== History ==
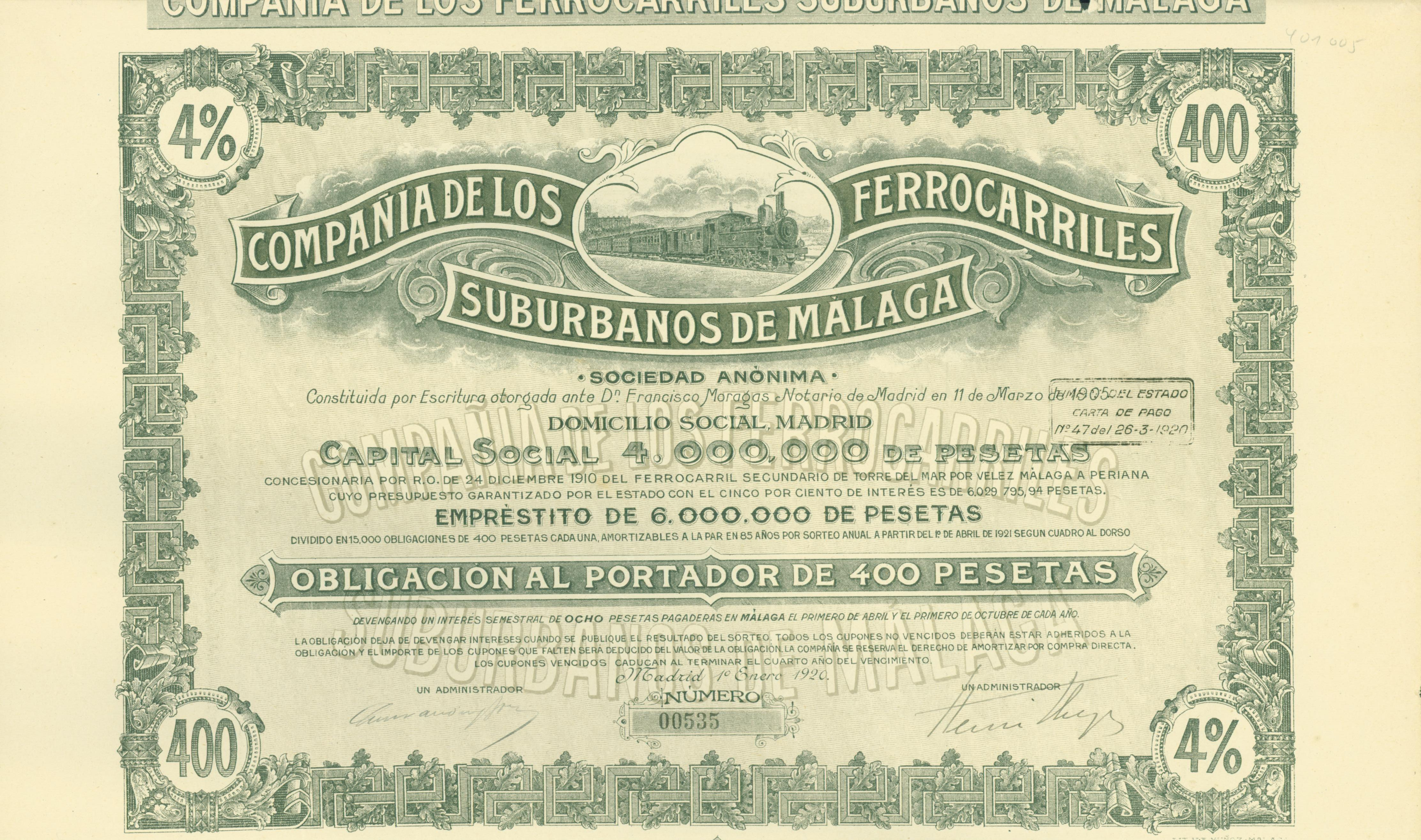
Bond of the Comp. de los Ferrocarriles Suburbanos de Malaga, issued 1 January 1920

In 1908, the first line of the Ferrocarriles Suburbanos de Málaga opened; a metre-gauge rail network connecting Málaga to Vélez-Málaga. This line was later extended to Ventas de Zafarraya, along with lines to Coín and Fuengirola. The lines closed in stages between 1960 and 1968. Part of the corridor to Fuengirola was rebuilt to 1668 mm Iberian gauge, with some sections placed underground including a re-routing of the line through Málaga Airport, branded as Cercanías Málaga, and opened in 1975.

== Lines and stations ==
The busiest stations on the network in 2018 were Málaga-Centro Alameda with 1,525,000 passengers, Fuengirola (1,408,000), Málaga María Zambrano (1,375,000), Arroyo de la Miel (1,293,000) and Torremolinos (1,109,000).

=== Line C-1 Malaga - Airport - Fuengirola ===
Line C-1 runs along the Costa del Sol. Services were half-hourly, but since 22 September 2011 the frequency has been increased to every 20 minutes.

There are long-standing plans to extend this line to Estepona to the west, and to Nerja in the east, but current stations are:

- Centro-Alameda
- María Zambrano connecting to Madrid–Málaga high-speed rail line/Metro de Málaga
- Victoria Kent (see Victoria Kent)
- Guadalhorce
- Aeropuerto with eventual connection to Metro de Málaga
- Plaza Mayor
- Los Álamos
- La Colina
- Torremolinos
- Montemar-Alto
- El Pinillo
- Benalmádena-Arroyo de la Miel
- Torremuelle
- Carvajal
- Torreblanca
- Los Boliches
- Fuengirola

=== Line C-2 Málaga - Álora ===
Line C-2 runs inland from Málaga to Álora. The stations are:

- Centro-Alameda
- María Zambrano
- Victoria Kent
- Los Prados
- Campanillas
- Cártama
- Aljaima
- Pizarra
- Álora

== Future expansion ==
The Costa del Sol railway extension of the C-1 service from its current Fuengirola terminus to Marbella and Estepona is planned. In January 2018 three possible route alignments were determined, costing between €2 billion and €3.8 billion.

== See also ==
- Cercanías
