= Alvania cathyae =

Scientific classification
- Kingdom: Animalia
- Phylum: Mollusca
- Class: Gastropoda
- Subclass: Caenogastropoda
- Order: Littorinimorpha
- Superfamily: Rissooidea
- Family: Rissoidae
- Genus: Alvania
- Species: †A. cathyae

Binomial name
- †Alvania cathyae Landau, Marquet & Grigis, 2004

Species of gastropod

Alvania cathyae is an extinct species of minute sea snail, a marine gastropod mollusc or micromollusk in the family Rissoidae.

== Distribution ==
Fossils of this species were in the Early Pliocene strata near Estepona, Spain.
