= Málaga María Zambrano railway station =

Railway station in Málaga, Spain

Málaga María Zambrano
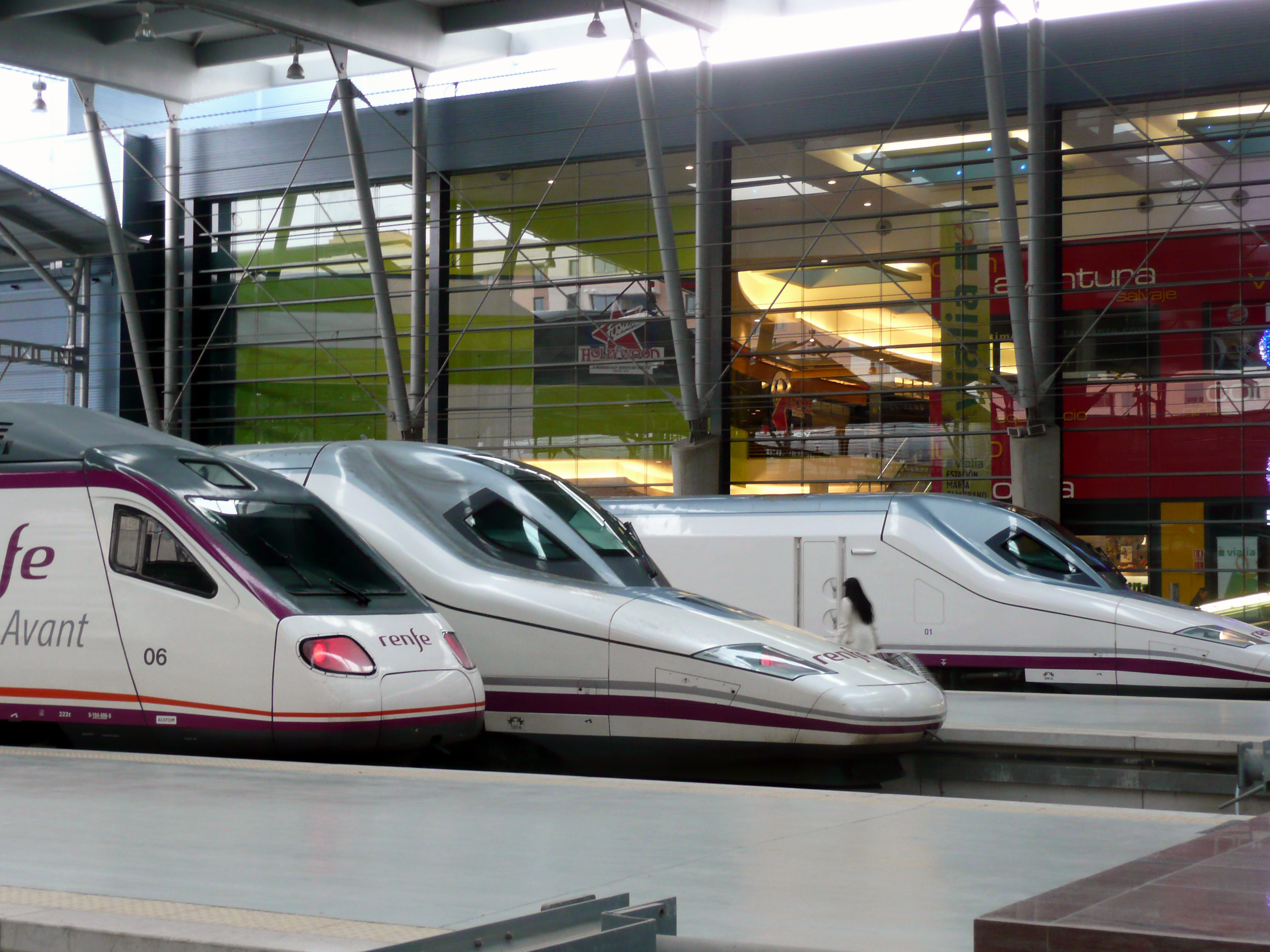
- AVE trains in the station

General information
- Location: Explanada de la Estación, 29002 Málaga, Andalusia, Spain
- Coordinates: 36.7118°N 4.4321°W
- Owner: ADIF
- Lines: Córdoba-Málaga high-speed rail line; Córdoba–Málaga railway

Passengers
- 2024: 8,910,735
Location

Málaga María Zambrano railway station (Spanish: Málaga María Zambrano) is the principal railway station in the city Málaga in Andalusia, Spain on the Córdoba-Málaga high-speed rail line. It is served by high-speed trains to Madrid, Barcelona as well as the Cercanías Málaga and Málaga Metro systems.

In 2024 the station served 8.9 million passengers. It is named after María Zambrano, a Spanish philosopher.

== Layout ==
Track layout of Málaga María Zambrano

Málaga María Zambrano contains twelve platforms, of which two are underground and exclusively used by Cercanías Málaga, which continue into the city centre to Málaga Centro-Alameda railway station. There are eleven tracks available in the station of which five are of standard gauge and used by AVE services. The Málaga Metro's El Perchel station is located outside María Zambrano station.

== Facilities ==
Designed as a public private partnership, Málaga María Zambrano operates as a Vialia shopping mall containing various retail outlets including Mercadona, MediaMarkt and H&M. It is estimated that up to 50% of the customers of these outlets are not rail passengers.

== Services ==
Preceding station	Renfe Operadora	Following station
Antequera-Santa Ana towards Seville-Santa Justa	Avant	Terminus
Antequera-Santa Ana towards Madrid Puerta de Atocha	AVE	Terminus
Antequera-Santa Ana towards Barcelona Sants	AVE	Terminus
Bobadilla towards Bilbao-Abando	Estrella "Picasso" closed	Terminus
Bobadilla towards Seville-Santa Justa	Media Distancia 67	Terminus
Álora towards Ronda	Media Distancia 70	Terminus
Preceding station	Cercanías Málaga	Following station
Victoria Kent towards Fuengirola	C-1	Málaga Centro-Alameda Terminus
Victoria Kent towards Álora	C-2	Málaga Centro-Alameda Terminus
