= Málaga Centro-Alameda railway station =

Railway station in Spain

Centro-Alameda
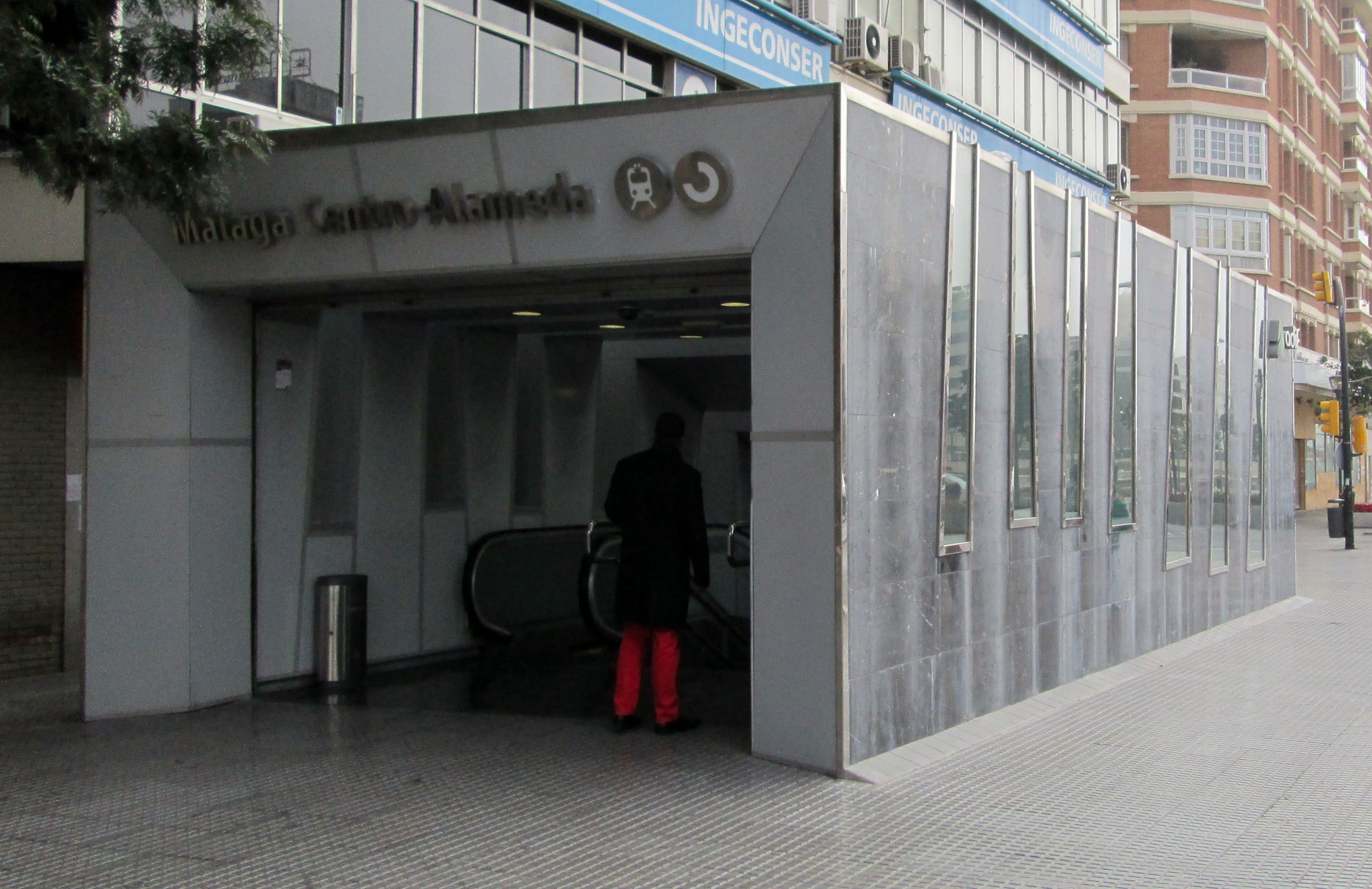
- Station's entrance

General information
- Location: Spain
- Coordinates: 36.7154°N 4.4266°W
- Lines: Renfe; Cercanías Málaga:
- Tracks: 1

Construction
- Structure type: Underground
- Platform levels: 1
- Accessible: Yes

History
- Opened: 1976
- Rebuilt: 2010

Passengers
- 2018: 1,525,000
Location

Málaga Centro-Alameda is an underground railway station opened in 1976 in the Spanish city of Málaga, Andalucia. It serves as the city centre terminus for Cercanías Málaga lines C-1 to Fuengirola and C-2 to Álora. In 2023 the Málaga Metro's Guadalmedina station opened, a short walk from Centro-Alameda.

== History ==
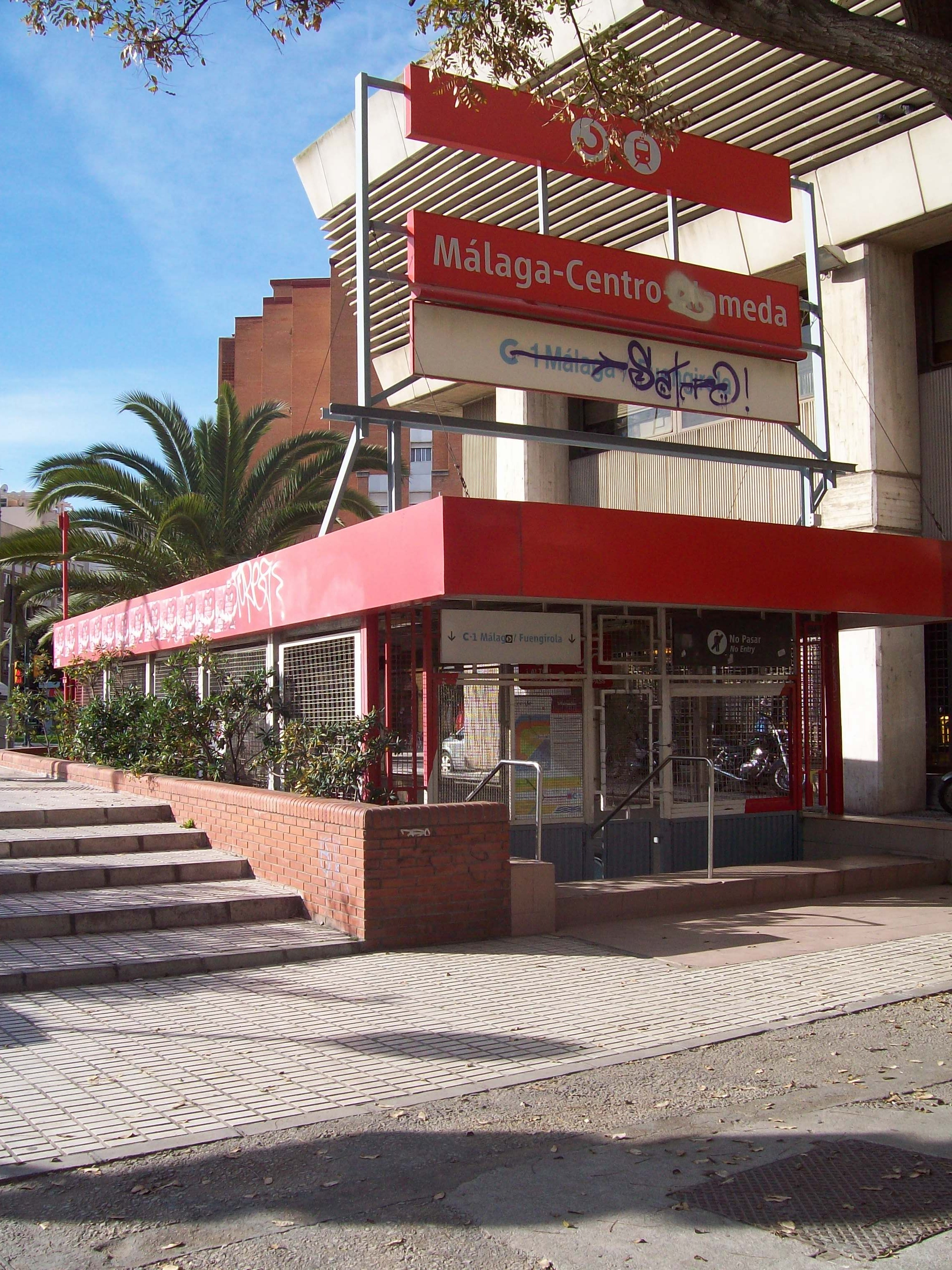
Entrance to Centro-Alameda station prior to renovation

The station opened in 1976 along with the C-1 Cercanías line to Fuengirola. From 2007 to 2010, the station closed for a €4.4 million renovation which included new entrances at street level, and to enable C-2 services from Álora to access the station via a tunnel leading to underground platforms at Málaga María Zambrano station.

== Services ==
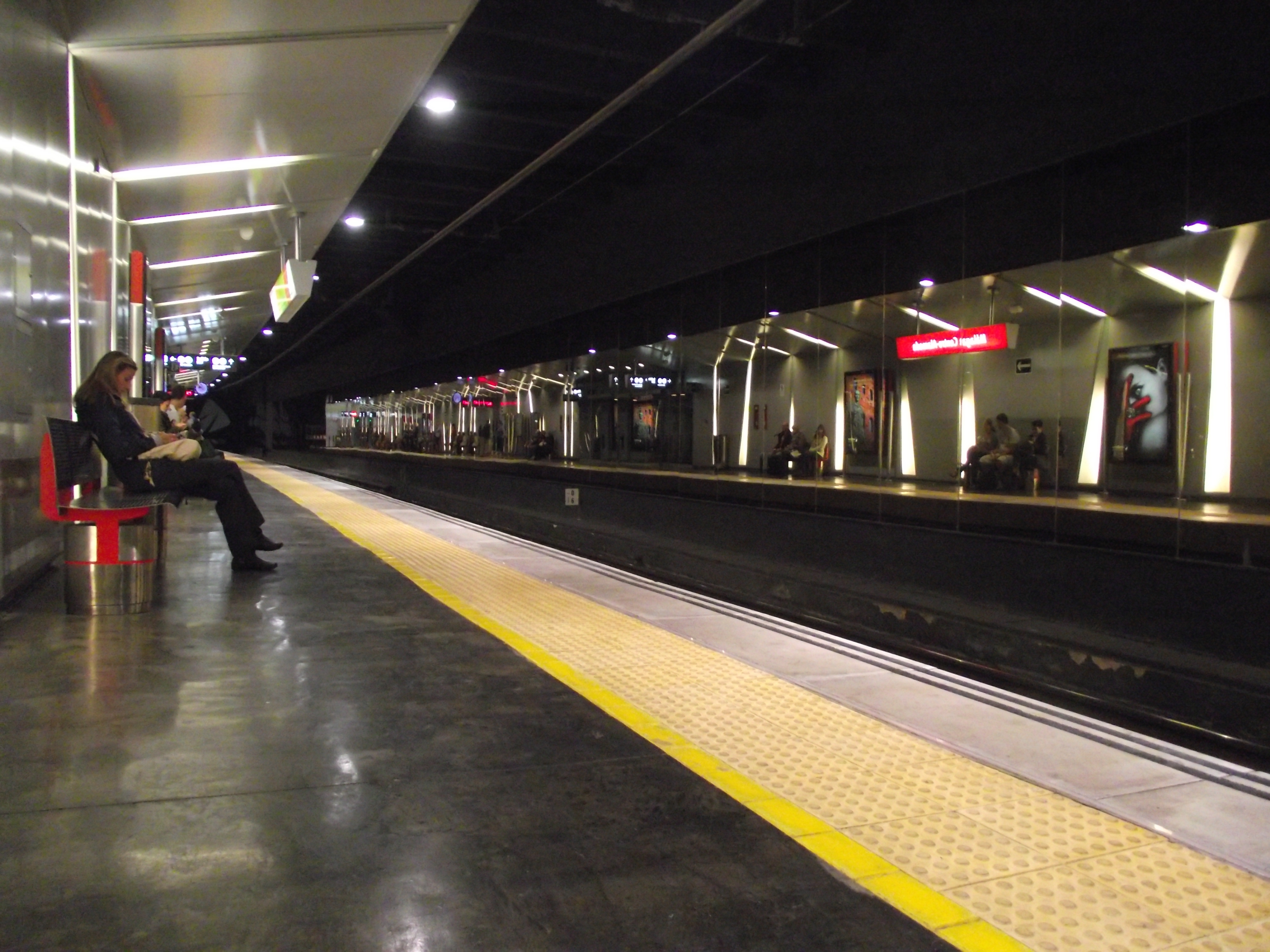
Station platform

Centro-Alameda is served by both Cercanías Málaga commuter rail lines, with a frequency of every 10–20 minutes.

Preceding station	Cercanías Málaga	Following station
Málaga María Zambrano towards Fuengirola	C-1	Terminus
Málaga María Zambrano towards Álora	C-2	Terminus
