= Costa del Sol railway =

Proposed railway line in Andalucia, Spain

Overview
- Status: Proposed
- Locale: Spain (Andalucia)
- Termini: Málaga/Fuengirola; Marbella/Estepona/Algeciras

Technical
- Line length: 53 km (33 mi)–55 km (34 mi) (Málaga–Marbella)

The Costa del Sol railway is a proposed railway line in Andalucia, Spain, to link Málaga with Marbella and Estepona on the Costa del Sol.

== History ==
Marbella is the most populous municipality in the Iberian Peninsula without a railway station in its territory, and is the only Spanish city of over 100,000 inhabitants not served by rail.

In 1975, the Cercanías Málaga commuter rail line opened, linking Málaga to Fuengirola. After its opening, an extension to Marbella was proposed. Planned since the 1990s, plans to build the line had never materialised, despite the extension has been described as "urgent".

In 2004, a study into building the rail line was produced, with a proposed completion date of 2012, which was cancelled following the 2008–2014 Spanish financial crisis.

In January 2018 a new study was produced, estimating the cost of the project to be between €2 and €3.8 billion. The Málaga branch of the Spanish Socialist Workers' Party announced support in February 2018 for the Costa del Sol railway to extend westward from Estepona to the existing Algeciras railway station and eastwards from Málaga to Nerja.

Andalucia announced in 2023 that it is seeking €2 billion of European funds from the Next Generation EU fund to help extend the existing Fuengirola track to connect Marbella, Estepona and Algeciras.

== Route ==
In the 2018 study, three possible route alignments were determined. Due to passing through many built-up areas, a significant portion of the line would be built underground.

The route of the line would roughly follow either the Autovía A-7 or the Autopista AP-7. Originally conceived as an extension of the Cercanías line from Fuengirola, in 2020 Málaga mayor Francisco de la Torre stated that an entirely new line linking Málaga to Marbella was required for capacity reasons.

Members of Parliament in the comarca of Axarquía requested in 2018 that the Junta de Andalucia not "forget" the region, and provide a rail connection between Nerja and Málaga via Torrox and Vélez-Málaga.

Political pressure has continued, particularly in Marbella, including a suggestion to set up a Municipal Commission.

The regional government of Andalucia continues to request funding for an extension to the existing line, or a high speed alternative

== See also ==
- Cercanías Málaga
- Rail transport in Spain
