= Carratraca =

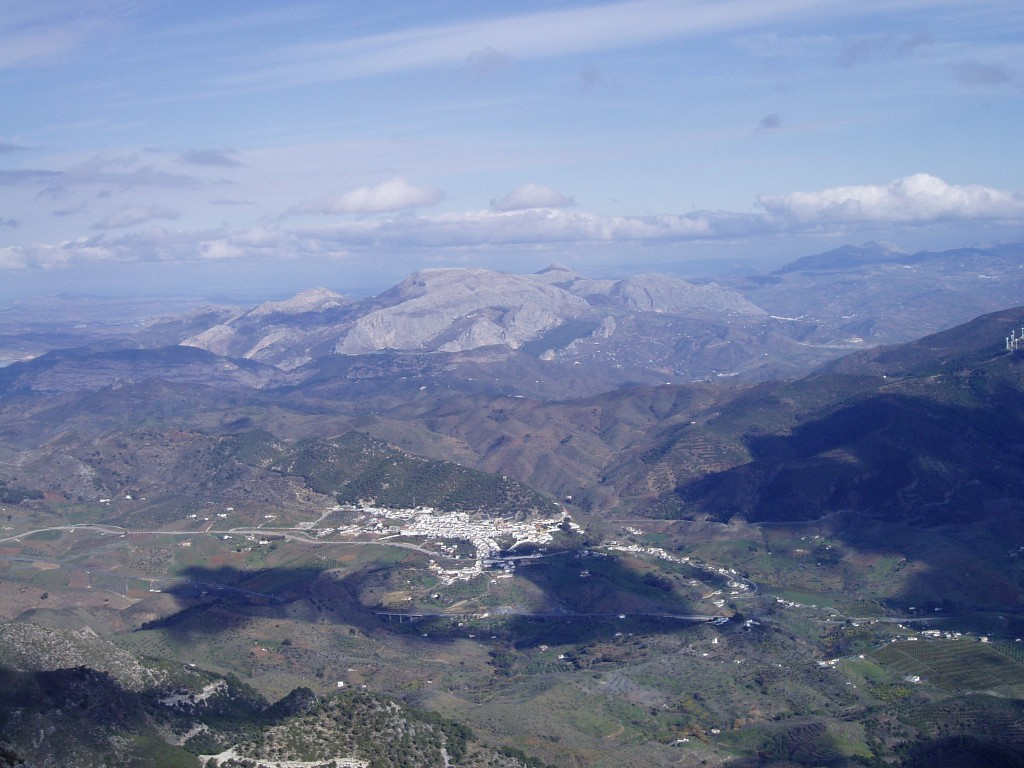

- Coat of arms

- Location in Andalusia Carratraca (Spain)
- Coordinates: 36°51′N 4°49′W
- Sovereign state: Spain
- Autonomous community: Andalusia
- Province: Málaga
- Comarca: Guadalteba

Government
  - Mayor: Marian Fernandez

Area
  - Total: 23 km^{2} (8.9 sq mi)
- Elevation: 550 m (1,800 ft)

Population (2025-01-01)
  - Total: 801
  - Density: 35/km^{2} (90/sq mi)
- Demonym: Carratraqueños
- Time zone: UTC+1 (CET)
  - Summer (DST): UTC+2 (CEST)
- Postal code: 29551
- Website: http://www.carratraca.es

Carratraca is a town and municipality in the province of Málaga, part of the autonomous community of Andalusia in southern Spain. The municipality is situated approximately 56 km from Ronda and from the provincial capital of Málaga. It is located between the northeastern foothills of the Serrania de Ronda. It has a population of approximately 850 residents.

It is one of the northern gates to the Guadalhorce Valley and border territory between these two comarcas and that of Antequera, which connects with Ardales. The landscape has very steep slopes in the Sierras of Alcaparín and is milder in the Sierras of Baños and Aguas, covered with pine trees and scrub pine and the occasional olive grove where the terrain permits. In the valley that runs through the town from north to south, and through which flows the stream of las Cañas, the field contains orchards on the banks of the streams and cereal crops and olive groves between them and the beginning of the mountains. Within the town of Carratraca, the architectural ensemble is shaped by the house of Doña Trinidad Grund, turned into the City Hall, and the tower next to said house. The terraces of these buildings offer views of the surroundings.

Near the stream of Pinos in the Sierra de Alcaparaín and a chasm 40 metres deep, a Neolithic burial, like a paint schematic of cruciform type and pottery with incised decoration has located. The strategic location of this land, between two towns with rich history, such as Álora and Ardales, favored the presence of man in it since ancient times.

The healing properties of sulfur springs that flow into Carratraca caught the attention of the Romans, who left copper and silver coins and statues of Tiberius, Claudius and Caesar at the site known as "La Glorieta", and a late Roman necropolis in Los Maderos near the stream of las Cañas.

The natives are called Carratraqueños.

== History ==
The origin of the municipality of Carratraca begins in the nineteenth century. Don Jose Salgado wrote a monograph in 1725, which stated that in this area there was only one house, known as the Cortijo de Aguas Hediondas. However, the baths found in the slope of the spring, the graves and remains of pottery discovered at different points of the town and above all, the traces of a fort, suggest that these places were inhabited during the Roman rule and, later abandoned for reasons unknown, are now covered by thick oak.

Carratraca was formed with the help its sulphurous waters. According to tradition, the discovery of the therapeutic properties of the waters was made by a beggar, Juan Camisón, so called because his only clothing consisted of a long and wide gown so as not to bother the sores covering his body. This man came to a farmhouse next to the spring to implore the charity of its inhabitants and noted that a goatherd threw water to the animals that had sores on their skin, and after some time healed. He then bathed himself and decided that after several dives, he also was healed.

With a more documented foundation, we know that in 1817 there was already a doctor in charge of the study and analysis of water and the sick.

== See also ==
- List of municipalities in Málaga
