= Estepona =

- Municipality
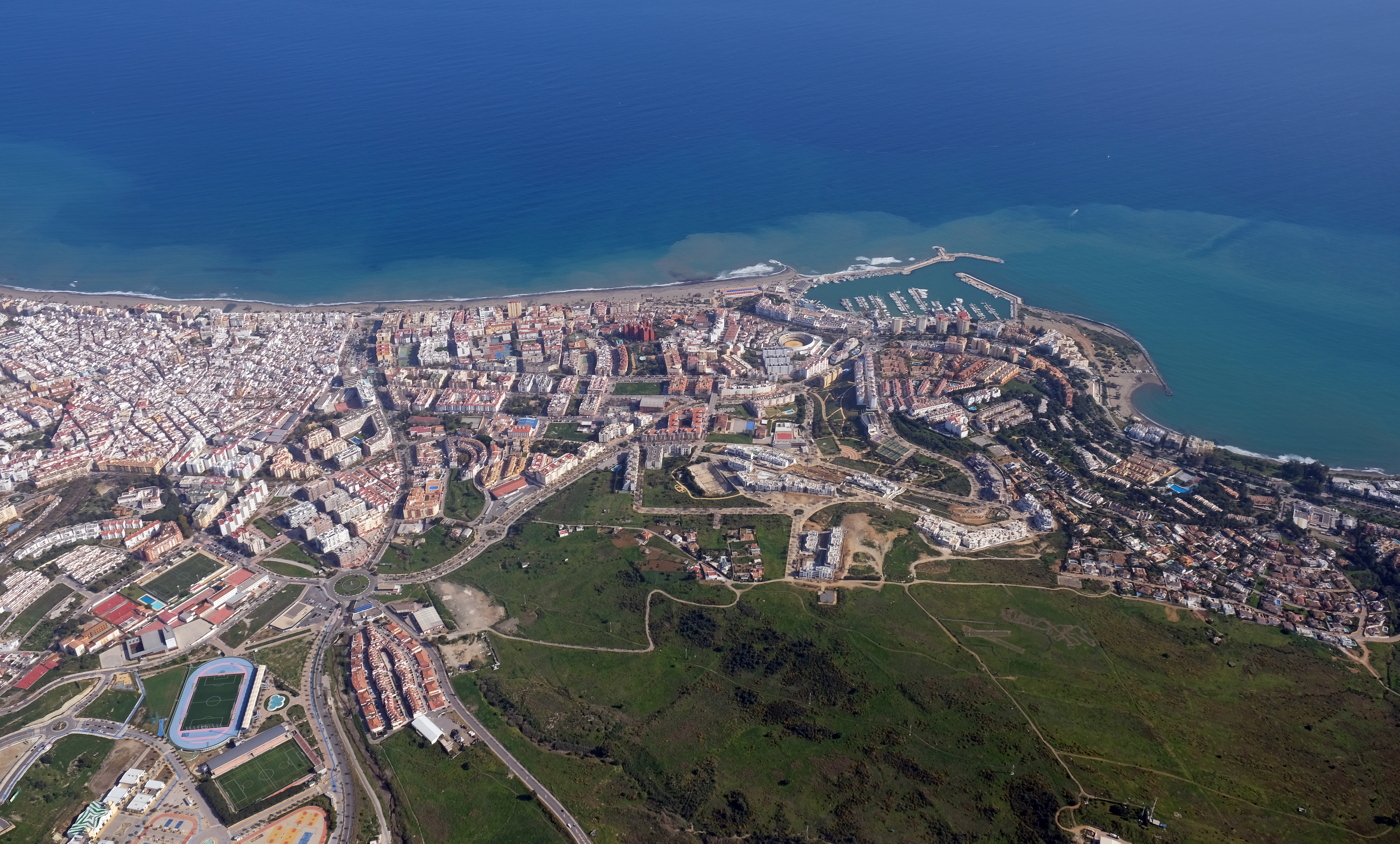

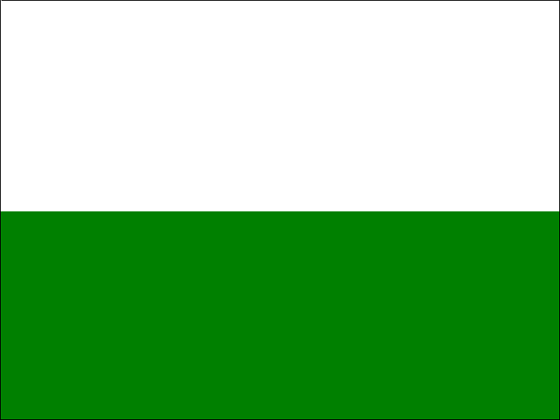
- Flag Coat of arms

- Location in Province of Málaga Location in Spain Location in Andalusia
- Coordinates: 36°25′35″N 5°08′50″W
- Sovereign state: Spain
- Autonomous community: Andalusia
- Province: Málaga
- Comarca: Costa del Sol Occidental

Government
  - Mayor: José María García Urbano (Spanish Popular Party)

Area
  - Total: 137 km^{2} (53 sq mi)
  - Land: 137 km^{2} (53 sq mi)
  - Water: 0.00 km^{2} (0 sq mi)

Population (2025-01-01)
  - Total: 79,621
  - Density: 581/km^{2} (1,510/sq mi)
- Time zone: UTC+1 (CET)
  - Summer (DST): UTC+2 (CEST)
- Website: http://www.estepona.es/

Estepona (Spanish pronunciation: [esteˈpona]) is a town and municipality in the comarca of the Costa del Sol, southern Spain. It is located in the province of Málaga, part of the autonomous community of Andalusia. Its district covers an area of 137 square kilometers in a fertile valley crossed by small streams and a mountainous areas dominated by the Sierra Bermeja, which reaches an elevation of 1,449 m at the peak of Los Reales.

Estepona is renowned for its beaches, which stretch along some 21 km of coastline. It is a popular resort and holiday destination.

Due to its natural environment, surrounded by the sea and the mountains, Estepona has a micro-climate with over 325 days of sunshine per year.

Estepona is a popular year-round holiday destination; it has two EC Blue Flag beaches, a modern sports marina with many tapas bars and restaurants. The white-walled town centre has many shops and picturesque squares. In the early 1990s, the Walt Disney Company chose Estepona as the original site for its Eurodisney project, but Paris, France, was later awarded the installation.

== History ==
The area has been occupied since prehistoric times; stone-age tools and dolmens have been discovered. Romans occupied the area, but a seaquake destroyed their town or villa in the 4th century. Archeologists have unearthed some foundations and ceramics, although the disaster's effects (together with massive redevelopment in the 1960s) make further finds unlikely. References to 'Salduba' or 'Silniana' as an important natural port in old documents may refer to this town, or possibly Marbella's San Pedro Alcantara district.

The name 'Estepona' probably comes from the Moorish Astabbuna or Al-extebunna. In 1342, the Battle of Estepona took place in the Bay of Estepona between the fleet of the Crown of Aragon and that of the Marinid Dynasty, with the victorious Aragonese fleet subsequently destroyed near Gibraltar, but Christian forces ultimately winning the Siege of Algeciras. Aben al Jhatib, writing in the late 14th century, mentioned the town as being in a state of decay, living on its reputation for culinary delicacies, with its monuments deteriorated. Henry IV of Castile captured the town from the Moors in 1457. A church was built over what had been the town mosque, and a town grew around it, although it too was subsequently destroyed and all that remains is the old clock tower (and the nearby Simon Fernandez school). San Luis castle was built for coastal defense against Berber pirates.

In 1502, the town (or the 25 Christian families resettled from northern Spain) received its first charter. However, it was governed as an administrative district of Marbella until 1729. Philip V of Spain then granted Estepona its own town charter. As the 20th century began, Estepona had 9000 residents, mostly farmers and fishermen.

In 1973, a culvert was built to allow the Monterroso river on Estepona's western edge to run underground.

== Transport ==
Gibraltar Airport is the nearest international airport serving Estepona. It is 45 km away and has direct flights to Manchester, London Heathrow Airport, London Gatwick and London Luton. Málaga Airport is the next nearest international airport serving Estepona and is located approximately 80 km away. Estepona is served by the Autovía A-7 which runs along the Costa del Sol. There is also a toll road, referred to as the Autopista AP-7, which provides faster travel along the route between Málaga and Estepona by-passing many of the urban areas along the route, such as Marbella. There are two toll stations en route and toll charges vary throughout the year. Normally you can travel from Málaga to Estepona for less than 10 euros in toll charges for a normal size car.

The Costa del Sol railway is planned to link Málaga to Estepona via Marbella.

== Estepona Port ==
Estepona Port and Marina is a working fishing port offering restaurants and bars. The port features daily auctions for a wide variety of seafood. The port is also the location of the Estepona street market - a collection of stalls selling numerous textile and leather goods mostly. The market is usually in Estepona on Sundays but it travels around the Málaga province to areas like Puerto Banús, Marbella, Casares, Torremolinos, Fuengirola and more.

== Real Estate ==
Estepona is recognised for its stable and high-value property market, attracting international buyers seeking luxury villas, golf-front estates, and marina residences. Despite fluctuations in nearby Costa del Sol areas, premium real estate in Estepona has historically shown strong resilience.

== Climate ==
Estepona has a subtropical Mediterranean climate (Köppen: Csa) with very mild, humid winters and hot, very dry summers. The summers are hot and very dry, with normally stable temperatures but temperatures above 35 °C (95 °F) are not rare. Winter temperatures are very mild, with average daytime highs around 18 °C (64 °F) and lows around 11 °C (52 °F). The annual average temperature is over 19 °C (66 °F). The city gets more than 300 sunny days per year, and it gets between 2,800-3,000 sunshine hours on average.

Climate data for Estepona, Spain
Month	Jan	Feb	Mar	Apr	May	Jun	Jul	Aug	Sep	Oct	Nov	Dec	Year
Mean daily maximum °C (°F)	17.7 (63.9)	18.4 (65.1)	20.1 (68.2)	21.3 (70.3)	23.6 (74.5)	27.2 (81.0)	29.8 (85.6)	30.0 (86.0)	27.5 (81.5)	23.9 (75.0)	20.5 (68.9)	18.3 (64.9)	23.2 (73.7)
Daily mean °C (°F)	14.3 (57.7)	14.9 (58.8)	16.4 (61.5)	17.4 (63.3)	19.5 (67.1)	22.6 (72.7)	24.9 (76.8)	25.1 (77.2)	23.1 (73.6)	20.1 (68.2)	17.0 (62.6)	15.1 (59.2)	19.2 (66.6)
Mean daily minimum °C (°F)	10.9 (51.6)	11.4 (52.5)	12.6 (54.7)	13.5 (56.3)	15.3 (59.5)	17.9 (64.2)	19.9 (67.8)	20.2 (68.4)	18.7 (65.7)	16.2 (61.2)	13.5 (56.3)	11.9 (53.4)	15.2 (59.3)
Average precipitation mm (inches)	108.1 (4.26)	91.3 (3.59)	67.4 (2.65)	57.3 (2.26)	27.6 (1.09)	7.6 (0.30)	0.3 (0.01)	2.1 (0.08)	26.7 (1.05)	79.4 (3.13)	124.2 (4.89)	154.0 (6.06)	746 (29.37)
Source: World Meteorological Organization (WMO)

== Places of interest ==
Puerto Banús is an upscale community about 30 minutes' drive away from Estepona Port, with a large number of designer stores.

Selwo Safari Park is styled after African safari parks and houses 2000 animals in semi-wild conditions. It is a 20-minute drive from Estepona Port on the public transport route.

Palacio de Exposiciones y Congresos de Estepona is the exhibition and congress centre of Estepona, located opposite the supermarket on the eastern edge of Estepona - closest to Marbella. This centre is home to nearly all of Estepona's organised events including product presentations, fairs, commercial exhibitions, concerts and more.

Ruta de Murales Artísticos, or Route of Artistic Murals, is a popular urban walk displaying facades of large buildings as canvases for more than 40 paintings.

=== Beaches ===
Estepona has over 20 km of coastline, and 17 different beaches. Most of these are immediately next to the various hotels and residential complexes outside the town itself. The nearest beaches to the town are the Playa del Cristo, and the Playa de la Rada. The Playa del Cristo is five minutes west of Estepona Marina. It is a small, sheltered, cove with lifeguards in season and also two "chiringuitos" or beach front bar/restaurants, a rough car park, and children's play area. As it is both sheltered from the east wind (locally known as Levante) and very shallow, it is very popular with families with primary-age children; this means that you need to come here early to get a seafront spot on the beach in July and August. La Rada Beach is much larger and more open; it is over 2.5 km in length, and runs from the marina past the Estepona Old Town to the beginning of the boardwalk near the big Carrefour supermarket in the east. It is the town's main beach, is backed by a very attractive Paseo Maritimo seafront promenade, and has every facility: bars, restaurants, play areas for children, showers, lavatories, access points for those in wheelchairs, and of course lifeguards in season. Parking is in the underground car parks along the seafront. There is also a popular naturist/nudist beach of Costa Natura to the west of Estepona, which was the first official naturist site in Spain.

=== Estepona Old Town - Centro Historico ===
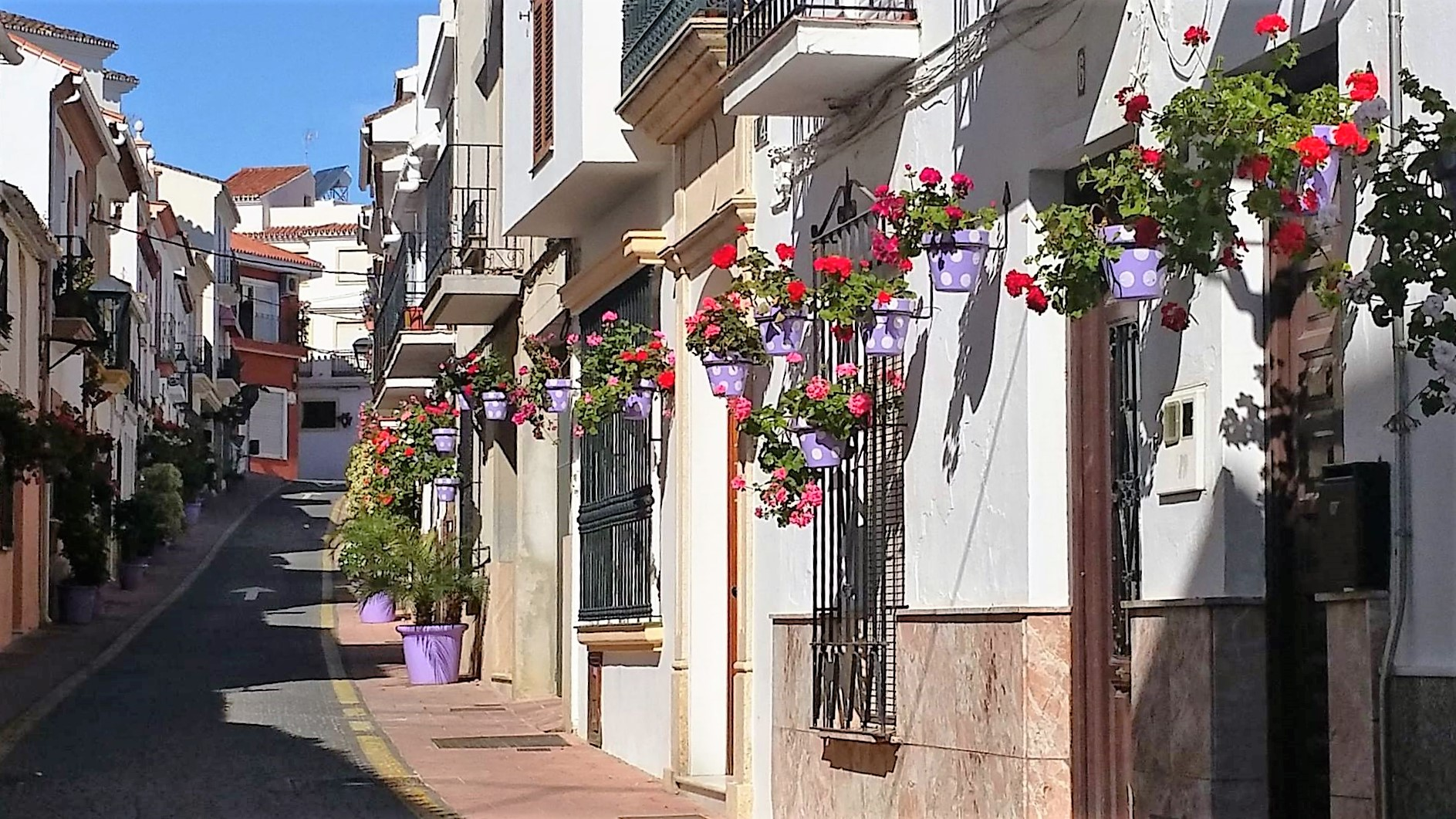
Calle Papuecas - Estepona Garden of the Costa del Sol.

The San Luis castle (Castillo de San Luis) dates to the 15th century when Queen Isabella I ordered it built to protect the town against the Moorish invaders. Most of the narrow streets and small, one-storey, houses were built in the 18th and 19th centuries, and until the mid 1950s many had no running water or sanitation. Since then, many have had a second storey built (sometimes with a roof terrace on top), all have electricity and all mod-cons, and most are in the more than 100 streets and plazas that have been improved and embellished by having the street repaved, sewers re-installed, and flowerpots provided - and filled - by the Ayuntamiento, the Town Council. Each street has its own colour scheme. The local residents take pride in their attractive streets, mainly traffic free nowadays. Unlike many other Old Towns in Andalucia, these streets are not lined with row after row of shops and bars.

=== Restaurants ===
Estepona is not known for the "night club" culture found in some areas on the Costa del Sol, but does have a wide variety of bar and restaurants. Except for Coral by OB, exclusive rooftop terrace, restaurant and club, dinner shows and other exclusive events taking place here. Dining choices emphasise locally caught seafood, and range from local Spanish cuisine to other Mediterranean cuisines, including Italian and French. Many restaurants have terraces allowing diners to eat al fresco (outside) during the late evening.

Most restaurants are located near the seafront, either along the main promenade fronting the sea or along Calle Real. There are a number of small plazas or squares next to Calle Real, on which numerous restaurants can be found.

=== Shopping ===
Estepona's small and medium-size local shops, particularly in the old town, offer locally made produce and goods. The recently renovated indoor market in the town centre has stalls offering fresh meat, fish and vegetables. Boutiques in the main town centre offer contemporary international clothing brands and other goods. Typical of Spanish towns of this size, a market is held in the main square (on Wednesdays), featuring clothing as well as food and vegetables. Estepona port also hosts a Sunday market for "touristy" goods.

There are no large shopping complexes in Estepona. The main food stores are the hipermercado complex at the edge of the town, a smaller express store in the middle of the town and several supermarkets. Two supermarkets in the port area feature fresh produce, meat and seafood as well as convenience style foods. The nearest large department stores are the complex just off the north ringroad of Marbella, and the department stores in Puerto Banús, just before Marbella. Both can be accessed by traveling east from Estepona towards Málaga on the A7.

== Sport ==
Cycling and tennis are popular in Estepona, with many road races held in the area, and three major tennis clubs. The many golf courses around Estepona include:

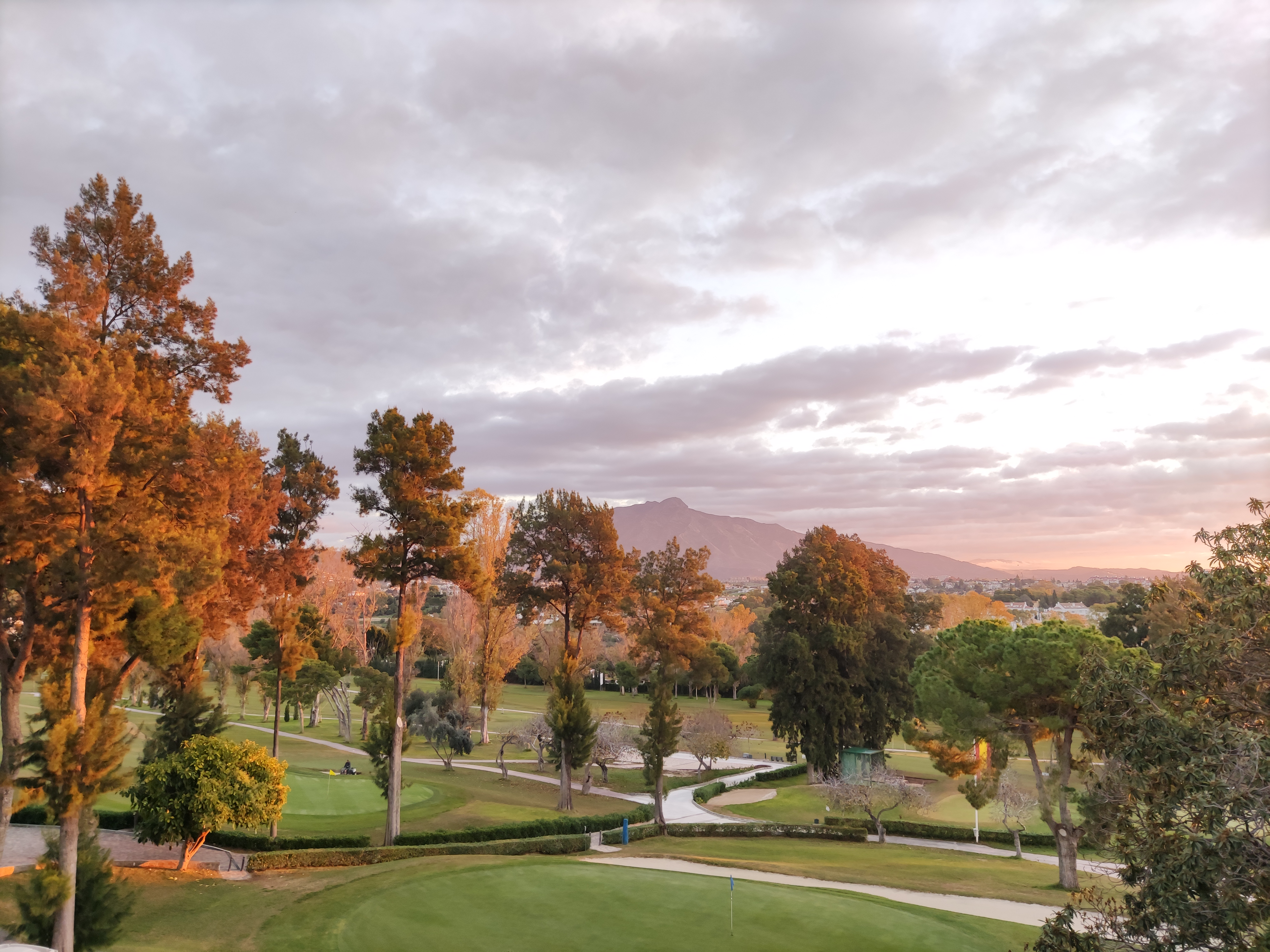
Atalaya Golf Old Course, Estepona

- Estepona Golf
- Valle Romano Golf Club
- La Duquesa Golf & Country Club
- La Resina Golf & Country Club
- El Paraíso Golf Club
- Finca Cortesin - Home of the VOLVO World Match Play Championship 2009, 2010 & 2012
- Doña Julia Resort

== Landmarks ==
- The Town Clock Tower.
- The San Luis Castle.
- The Church of Los Remedios.
- The Original Bullring.

== Local celebrations ==
- San Isidro Labrador, agricultural religious celebrations on 15 May.
- Ferias y Fiestas mayores, annual town festival at the beginning/start of July.
- Quema de los bigotes de San Juan, traditional solstice-night celebration of 23 June.
- Virgen del Carmen, fishermen religious celebrations on 16 July.
- Virgen de los Remedios, religious celebrations on 15 August.

== Gallery ==
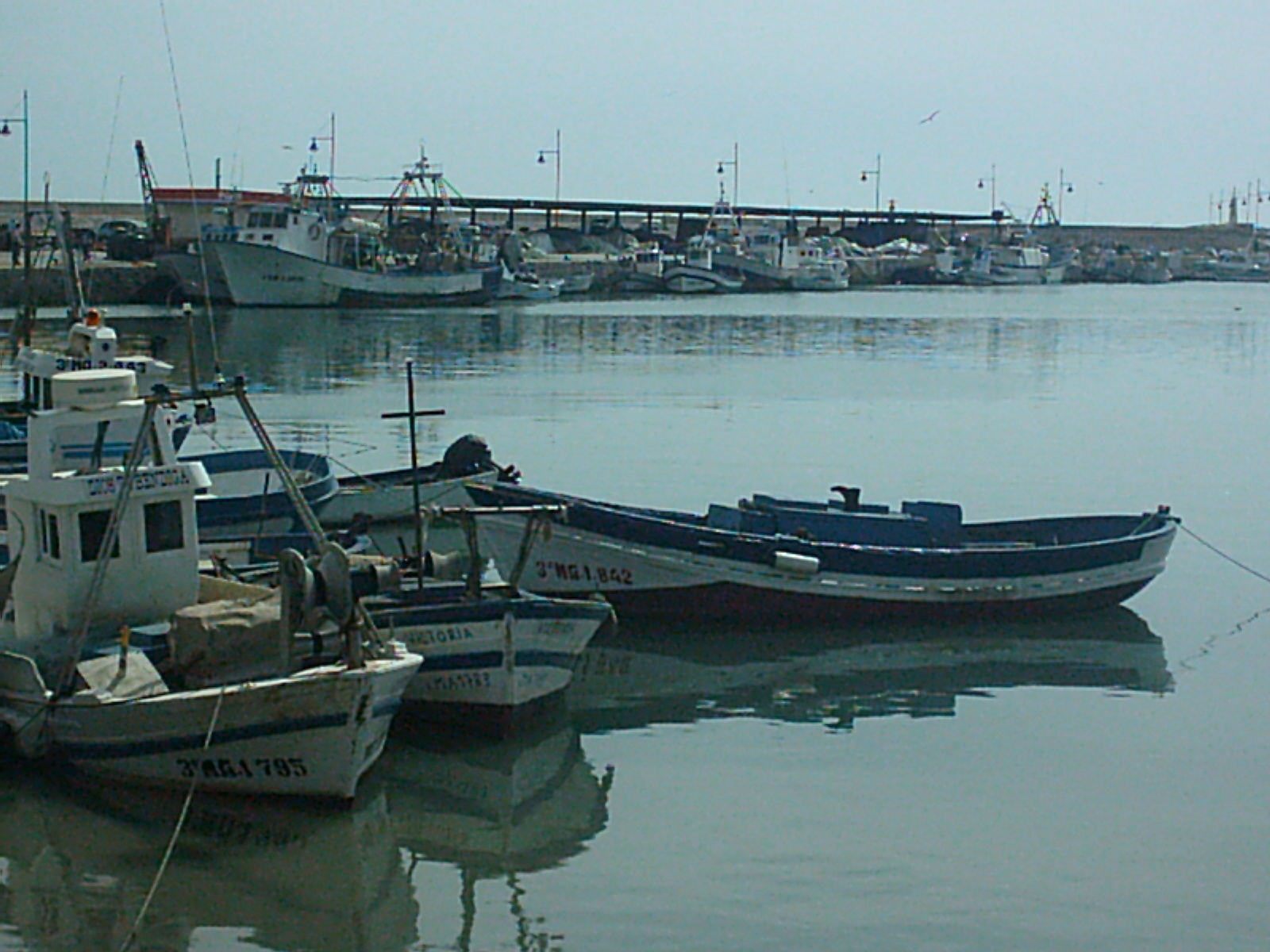
Estepona fishing port (2006)

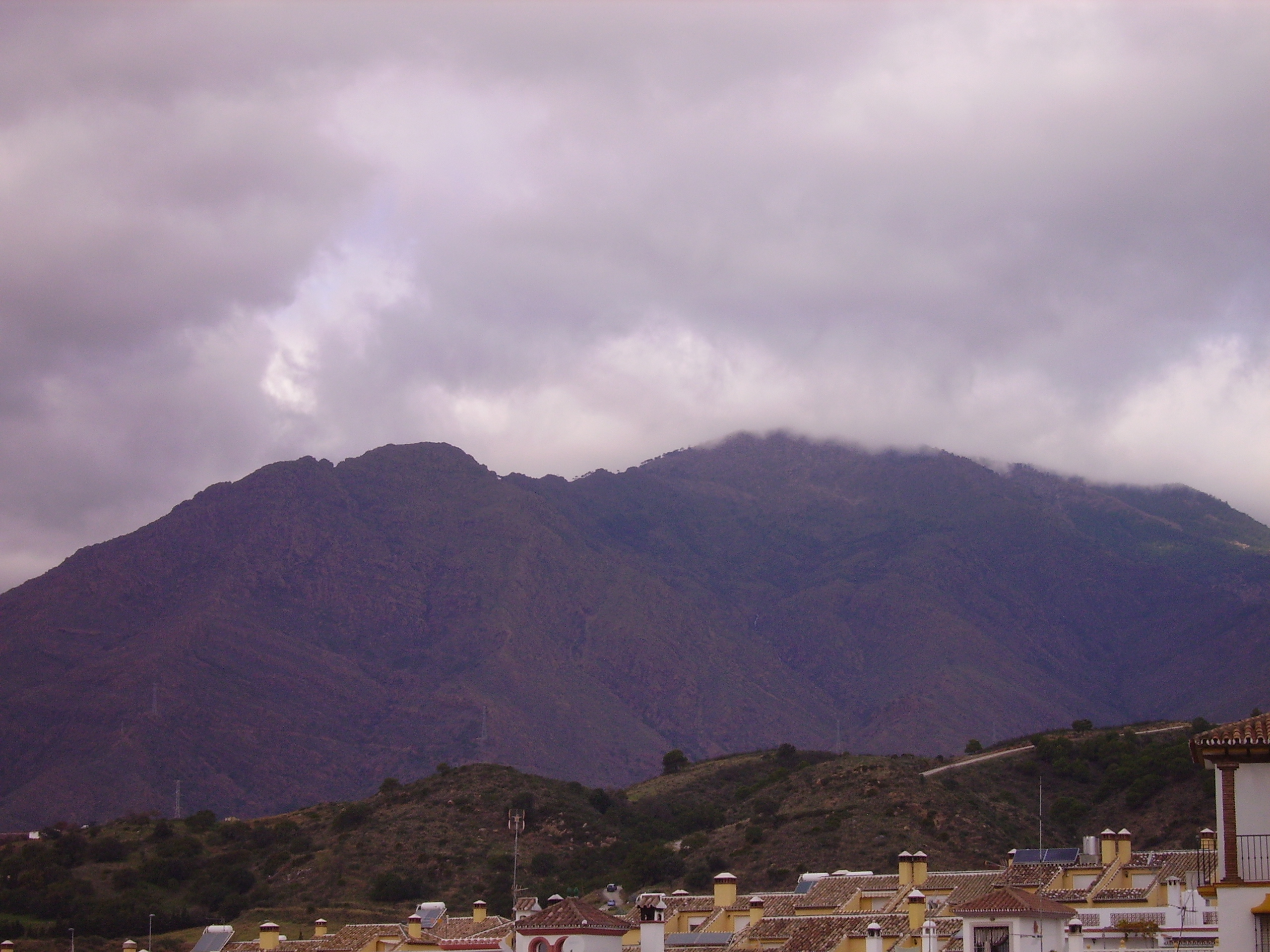
Mountain view from the calvario of Estepona.

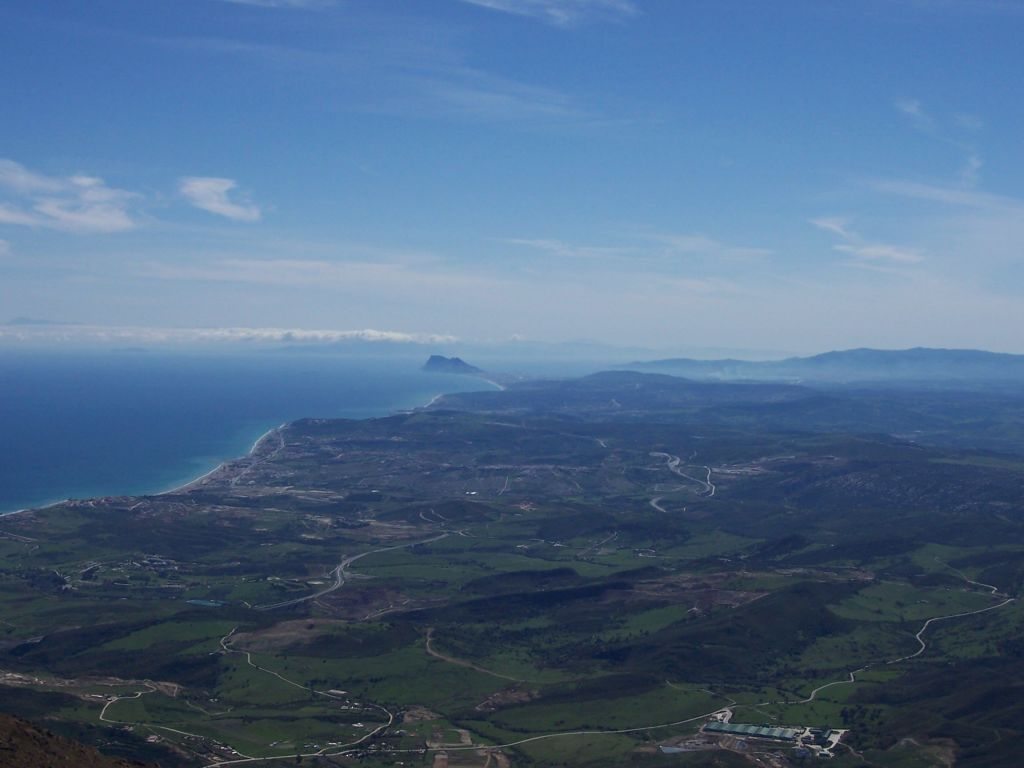
Photo from Los Reales to Gibraltar

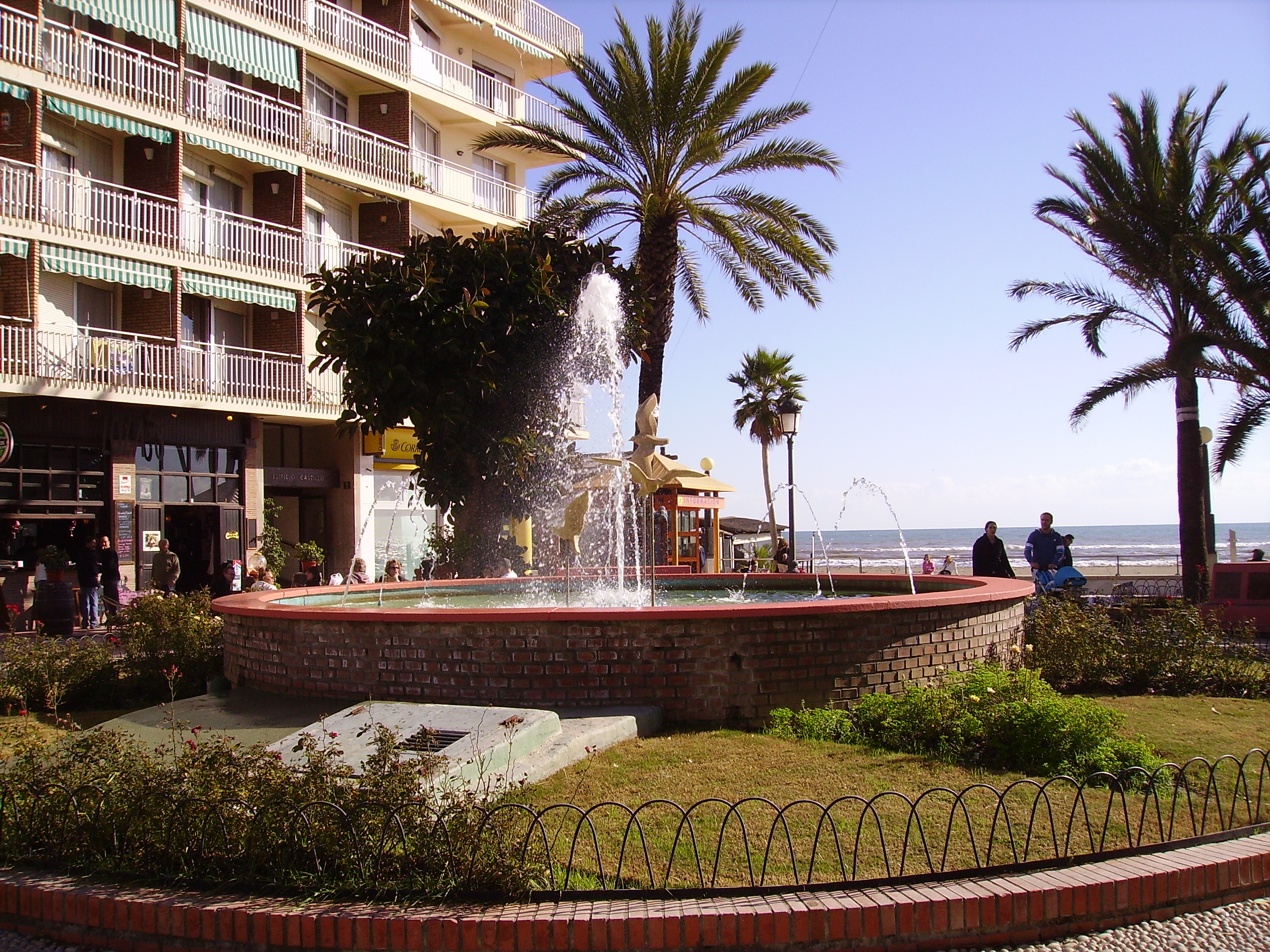
One of the entrances to the beach

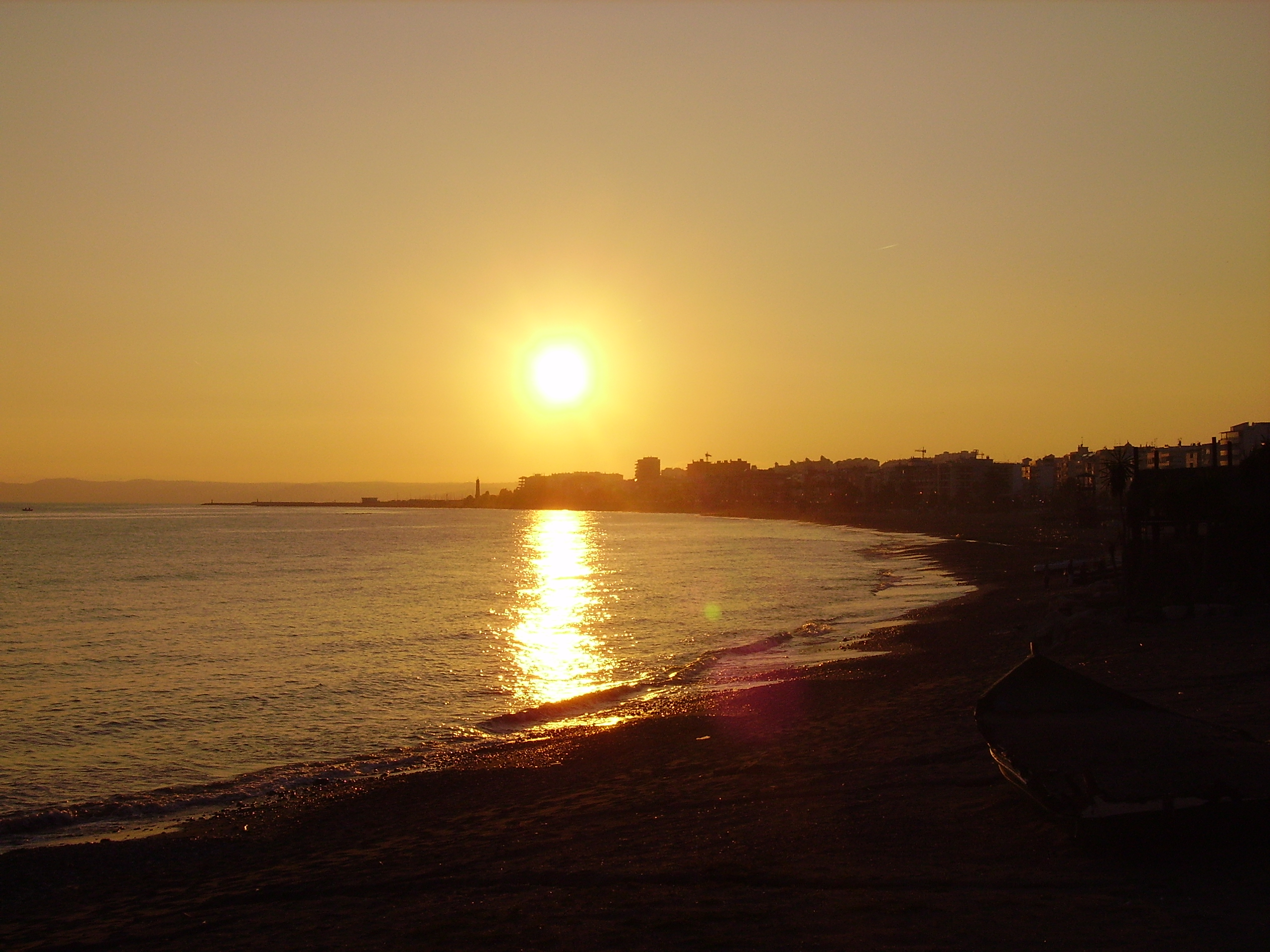
View of the sea from the promenade near Supersol

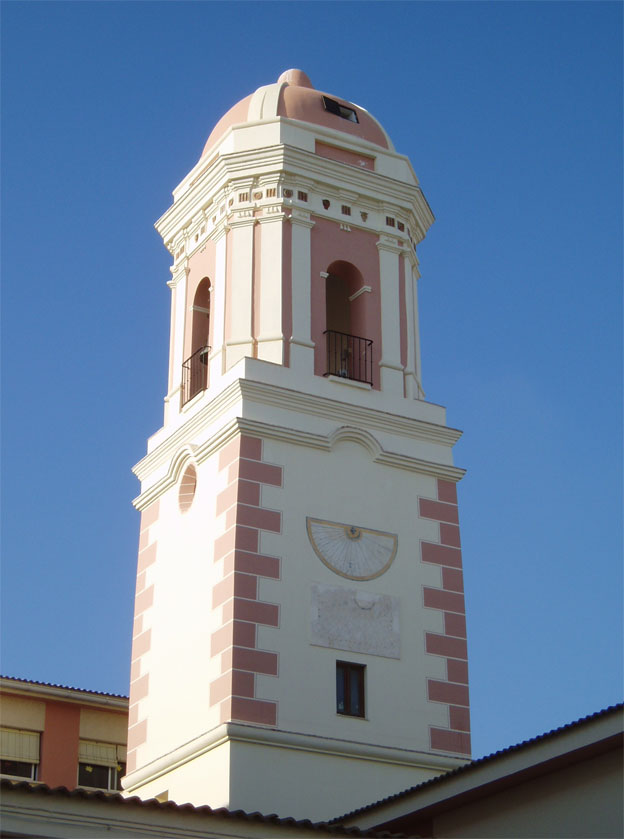
Clock Tower

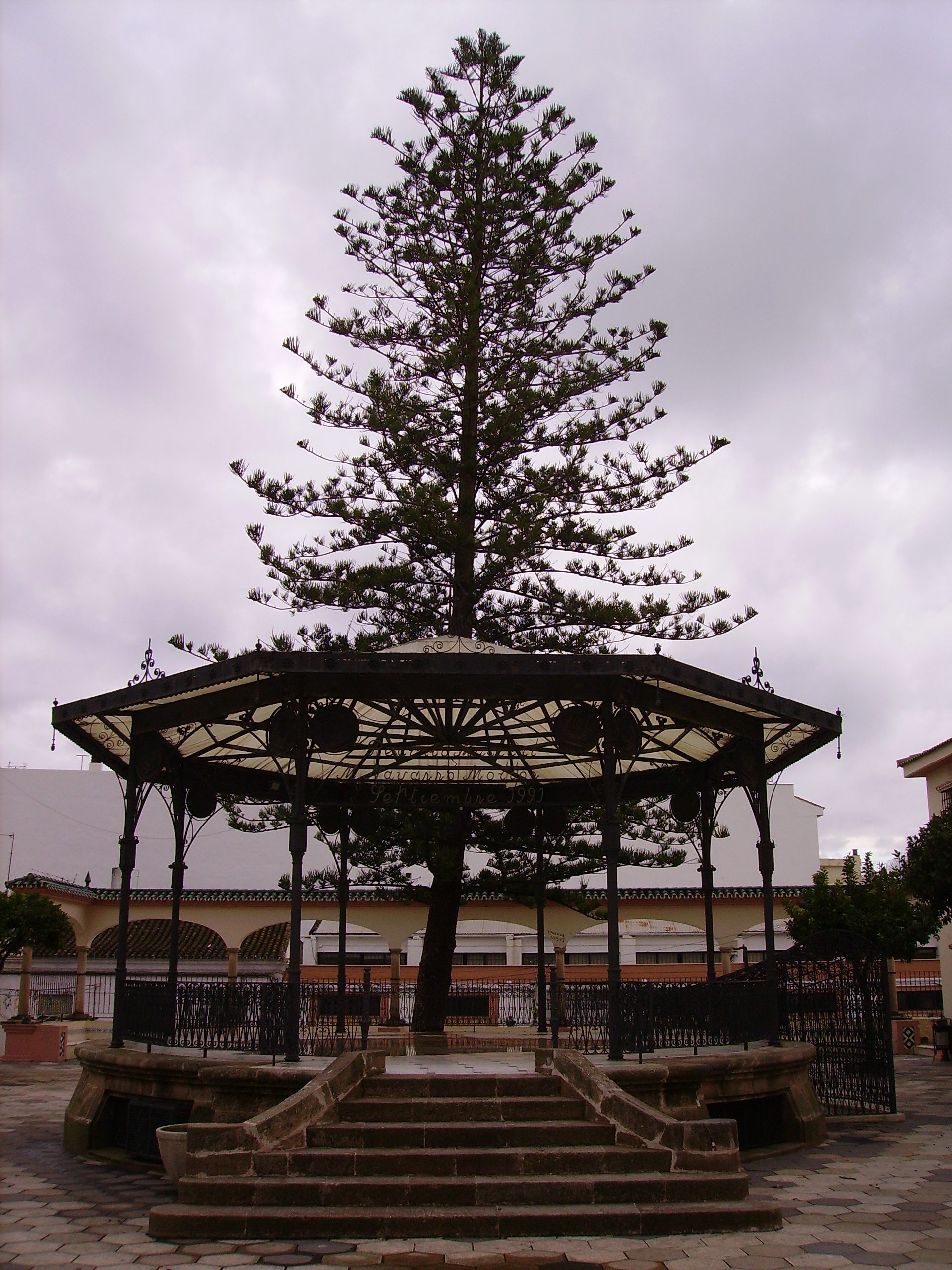
Clock Tower Place

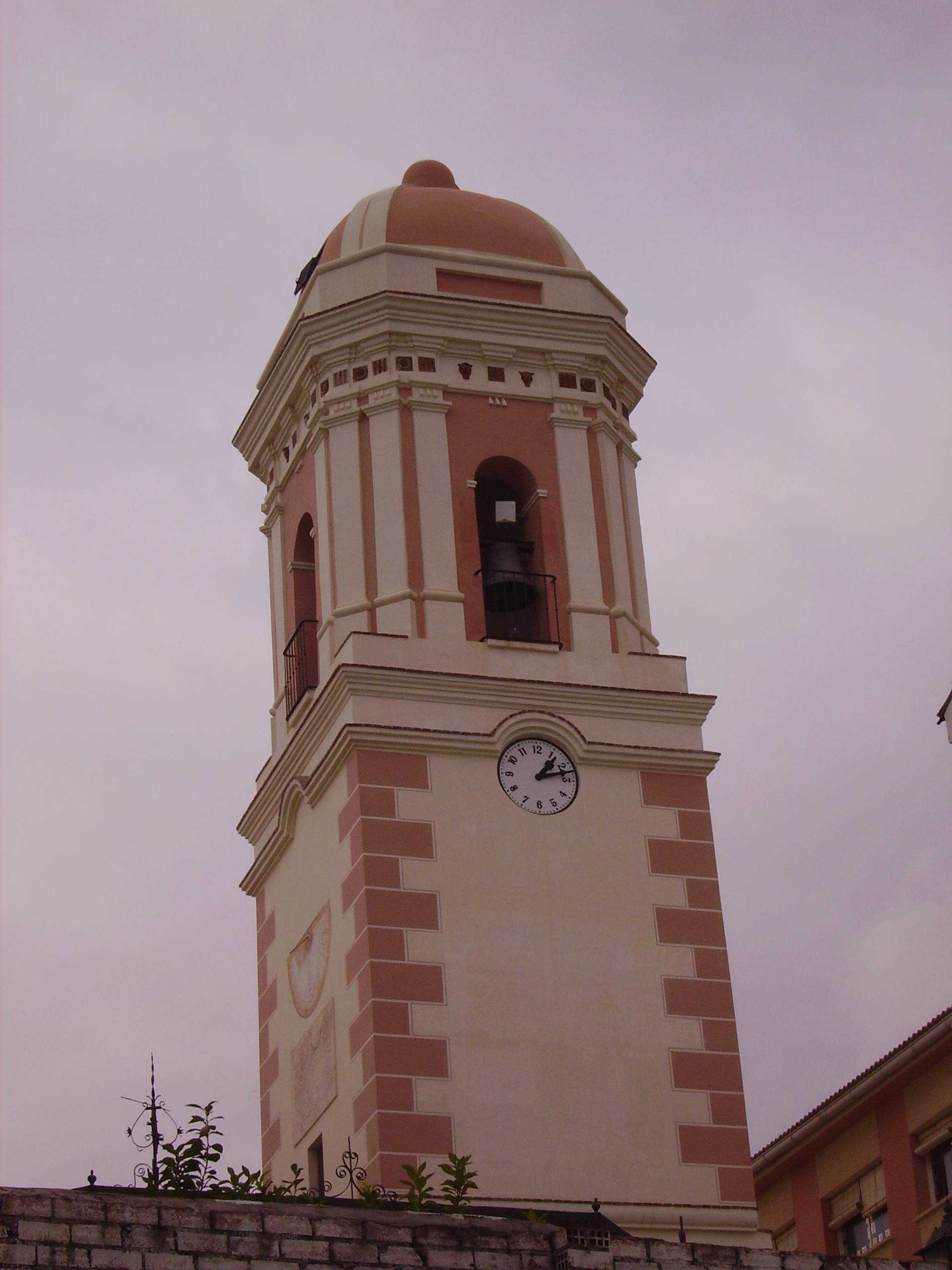
Clock Tower view front

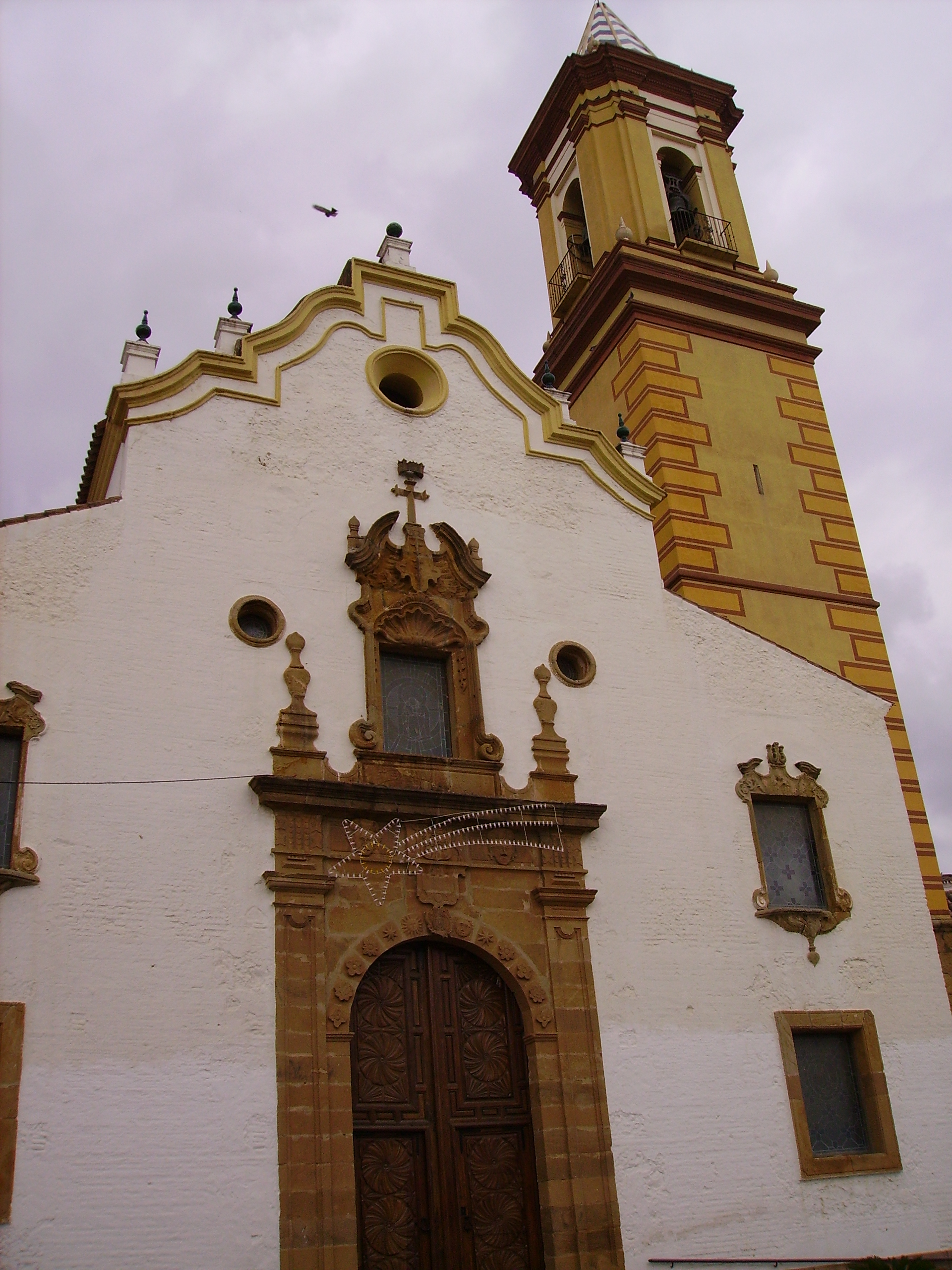
Church Sta. María de los Remedios

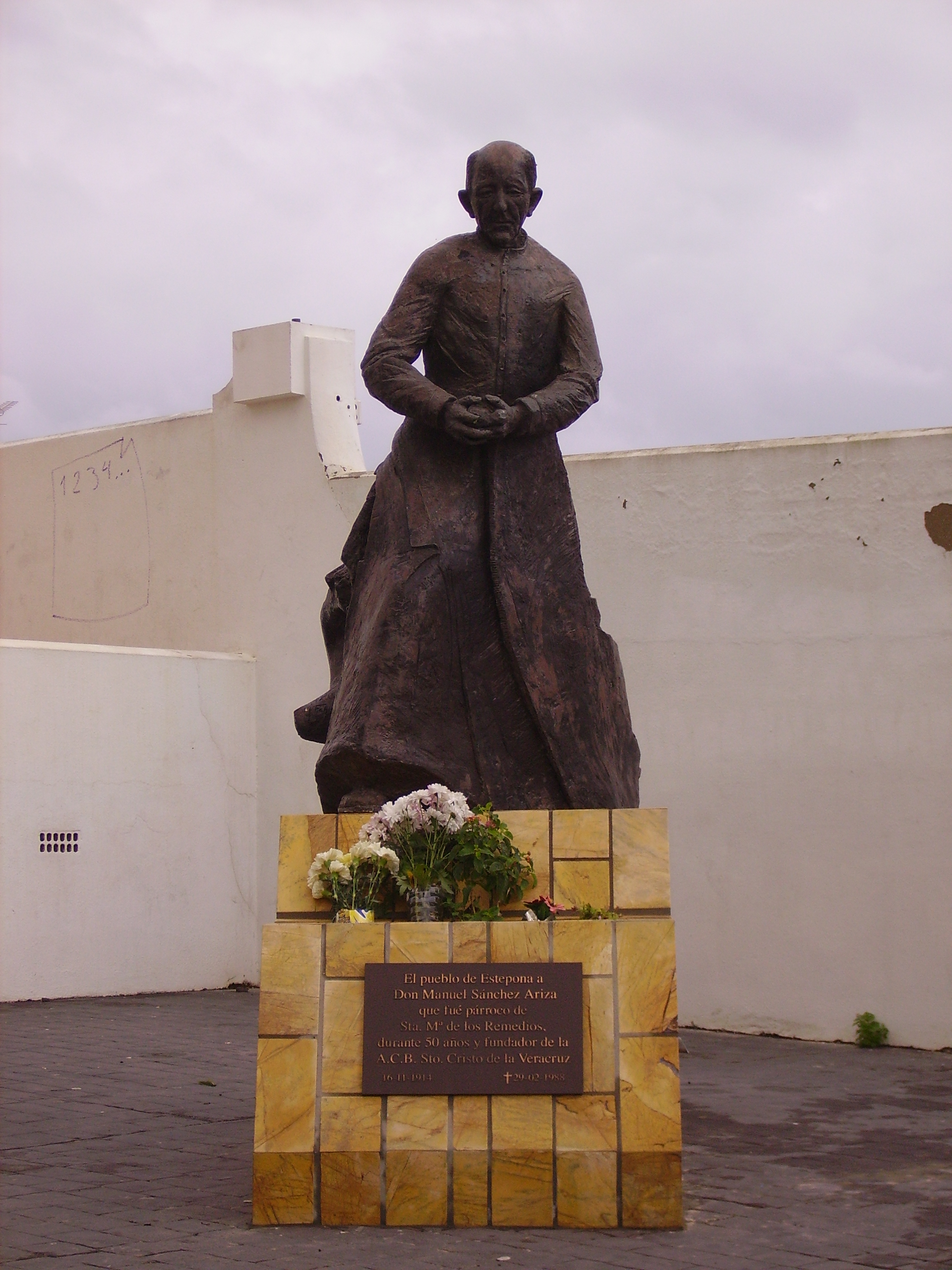
Don Manuel, old priest of Sta. María de los Remedios Church

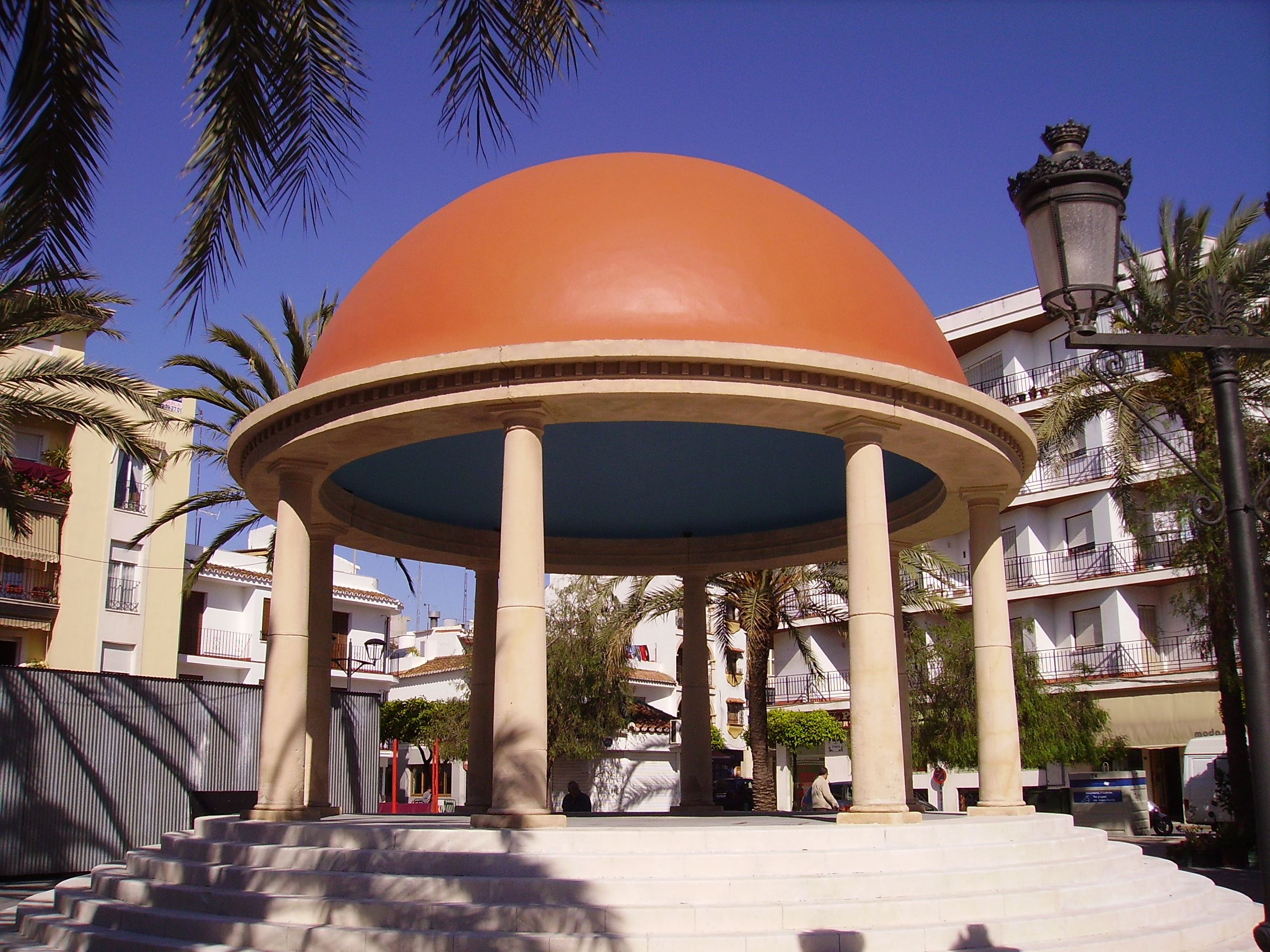
Plaza Antonia Guerrero, popularly known as 'la Plaza del Huevo' (The Egg Square) (this square was demolished in 2019)

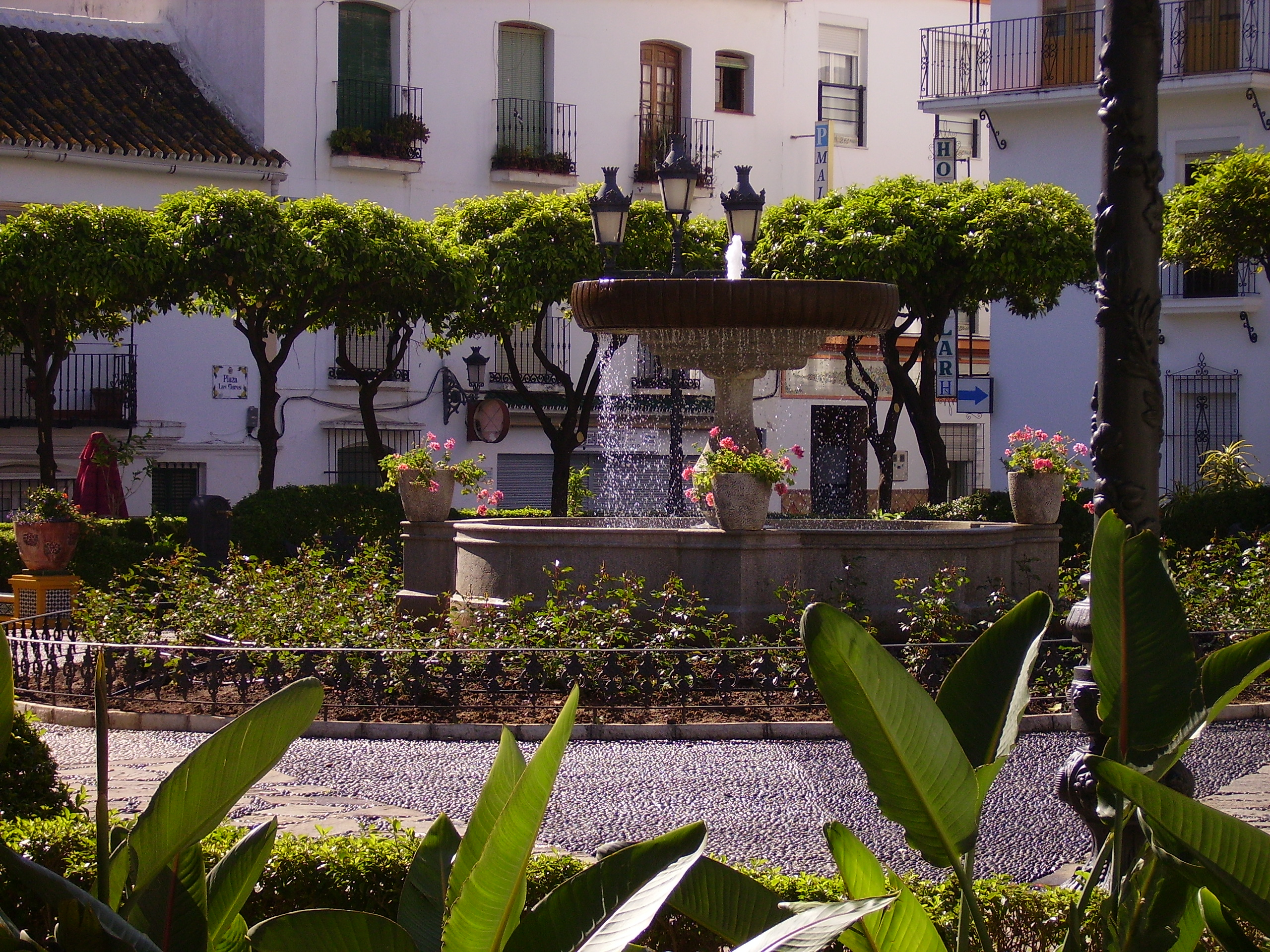
Flower Place

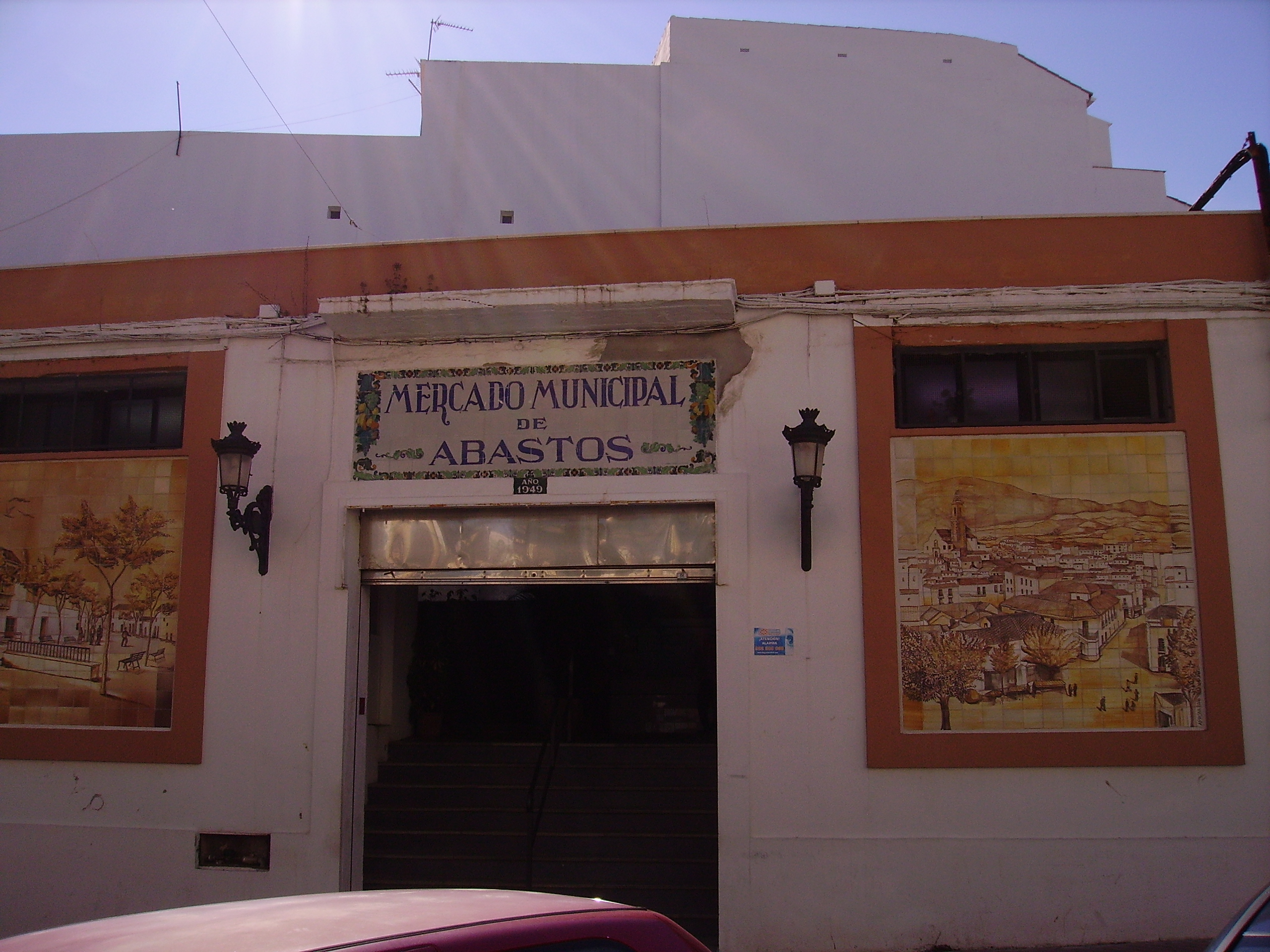
Central Market

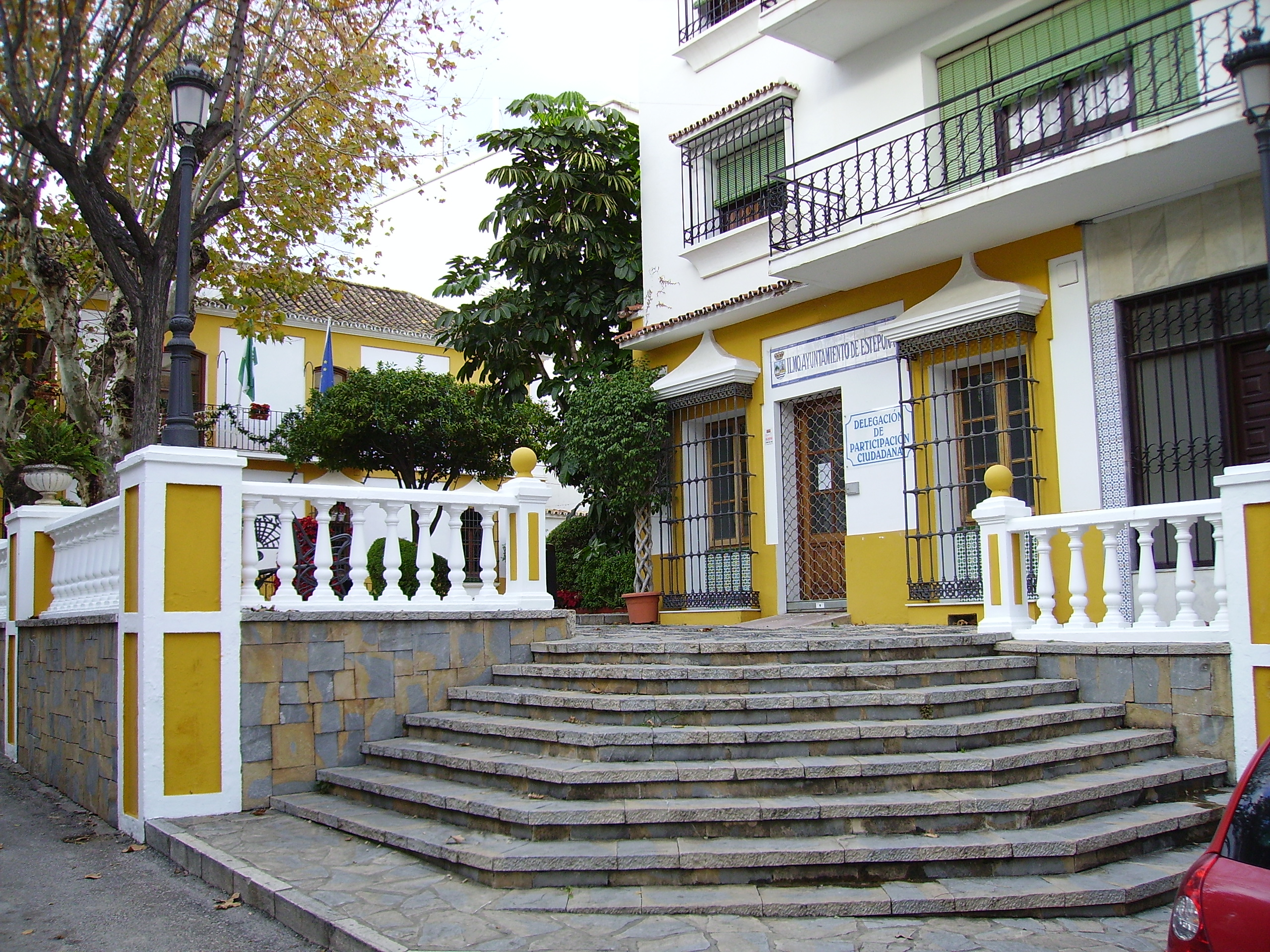
Town Hall

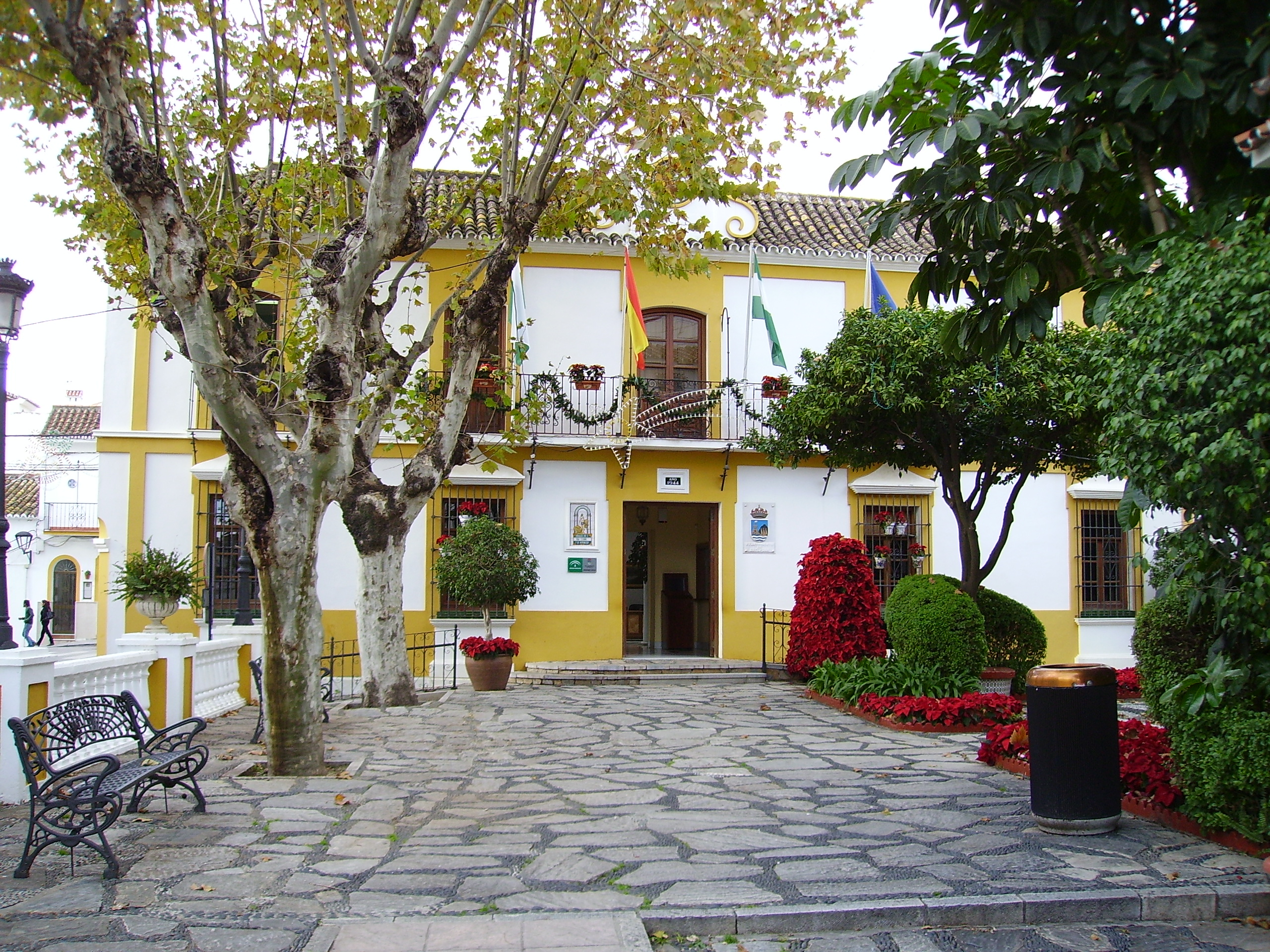
Town Hall

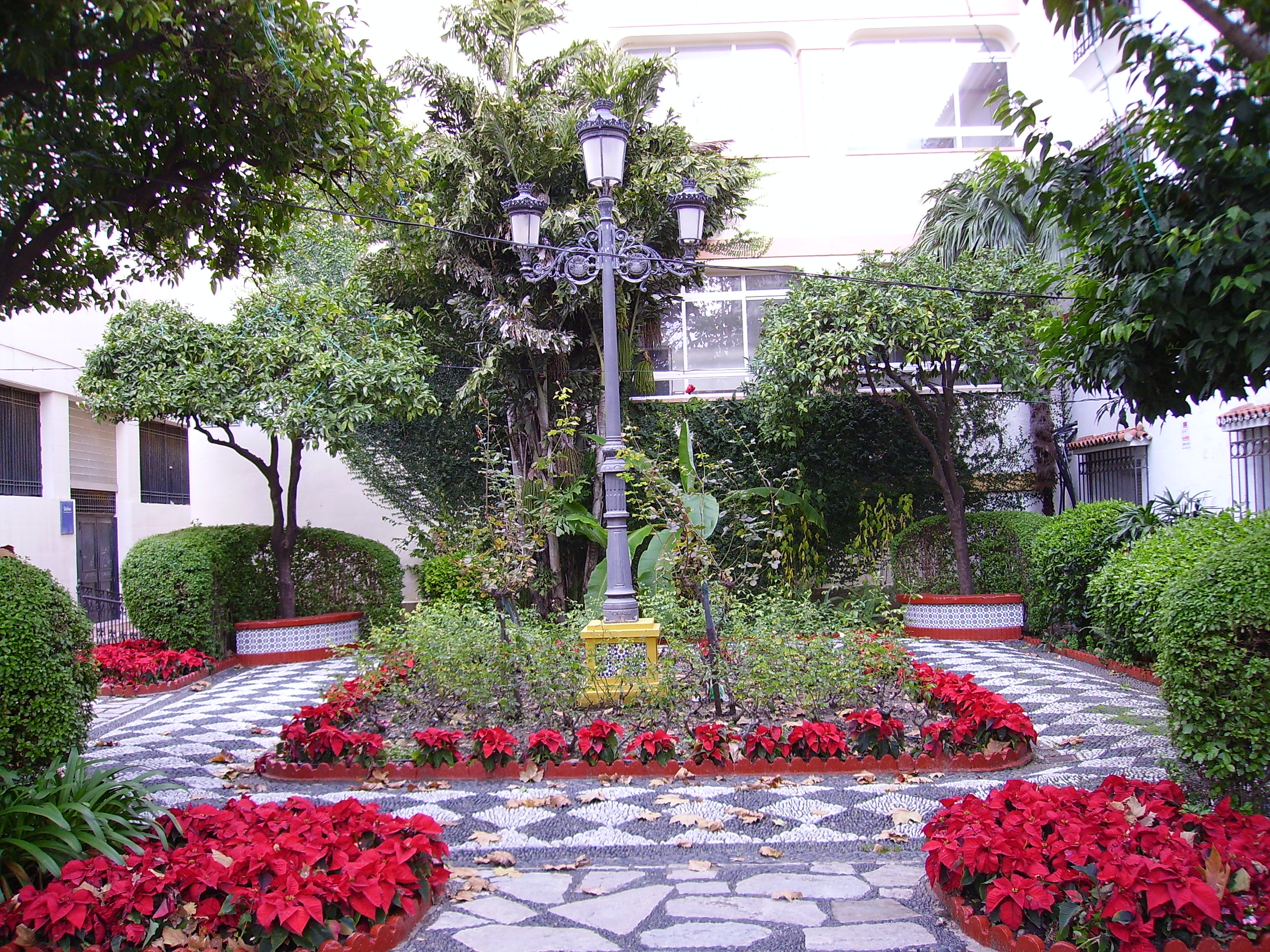
Town Hall

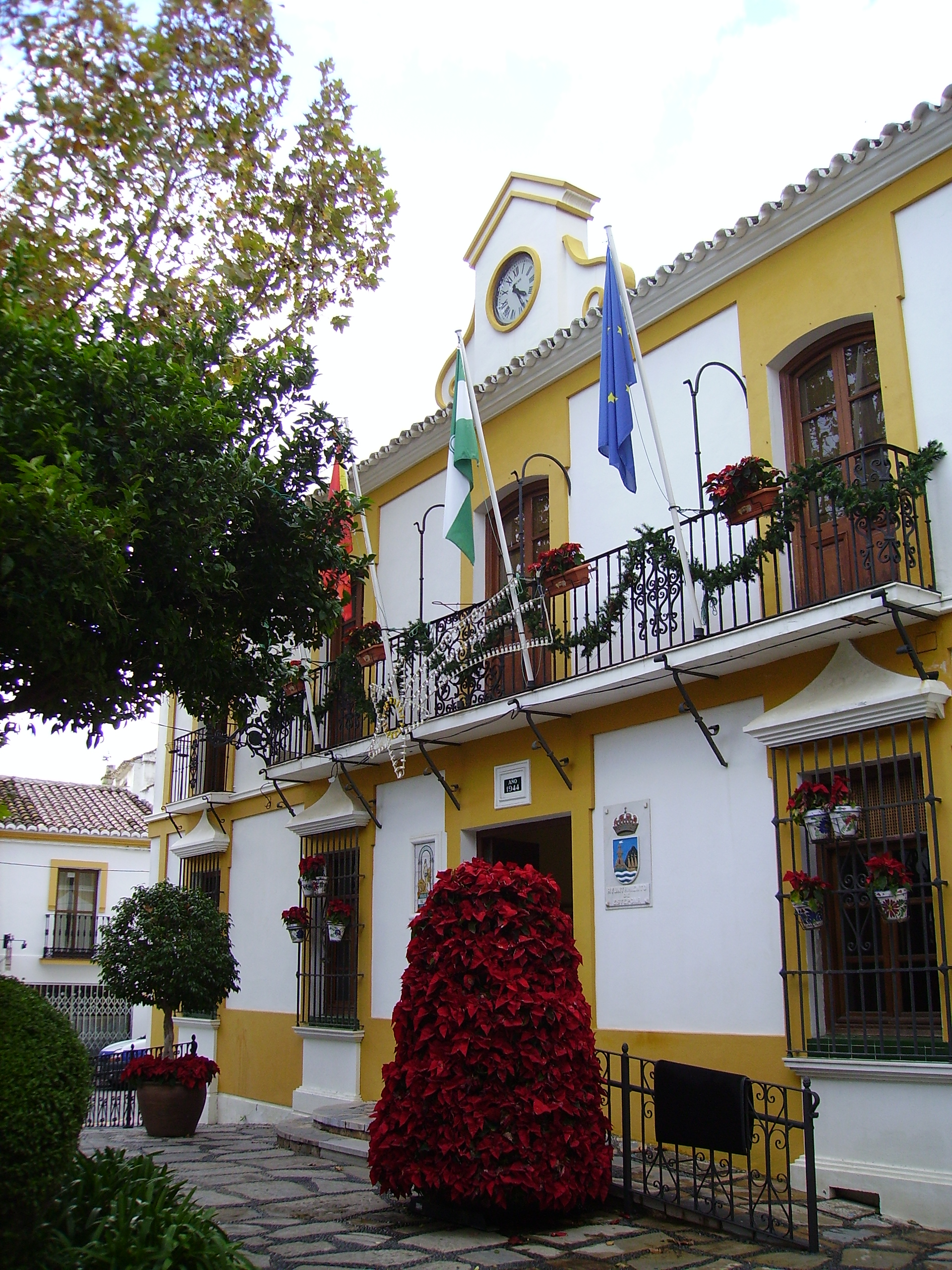
Town Hall

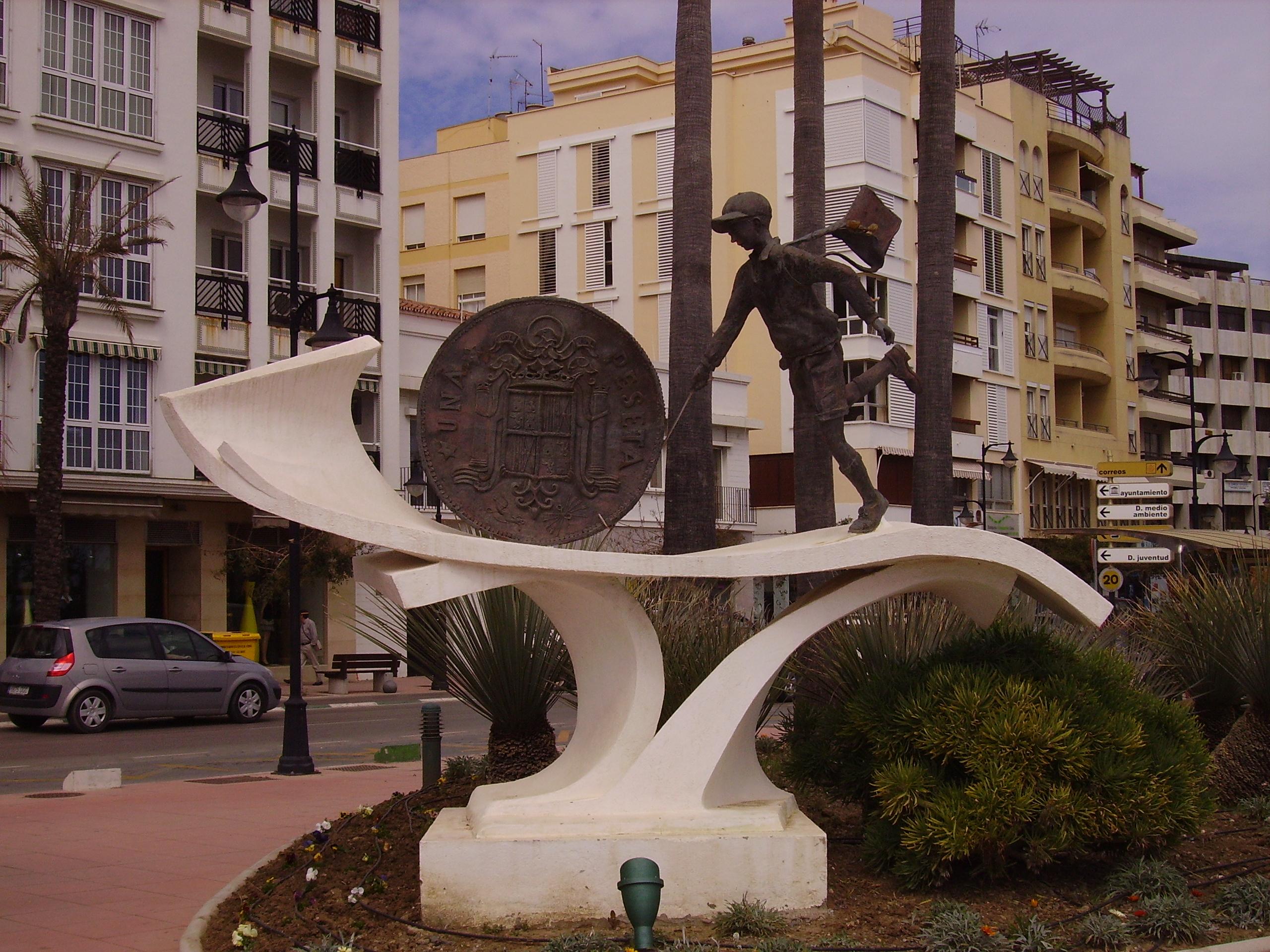
The Peseta - old Spanish money

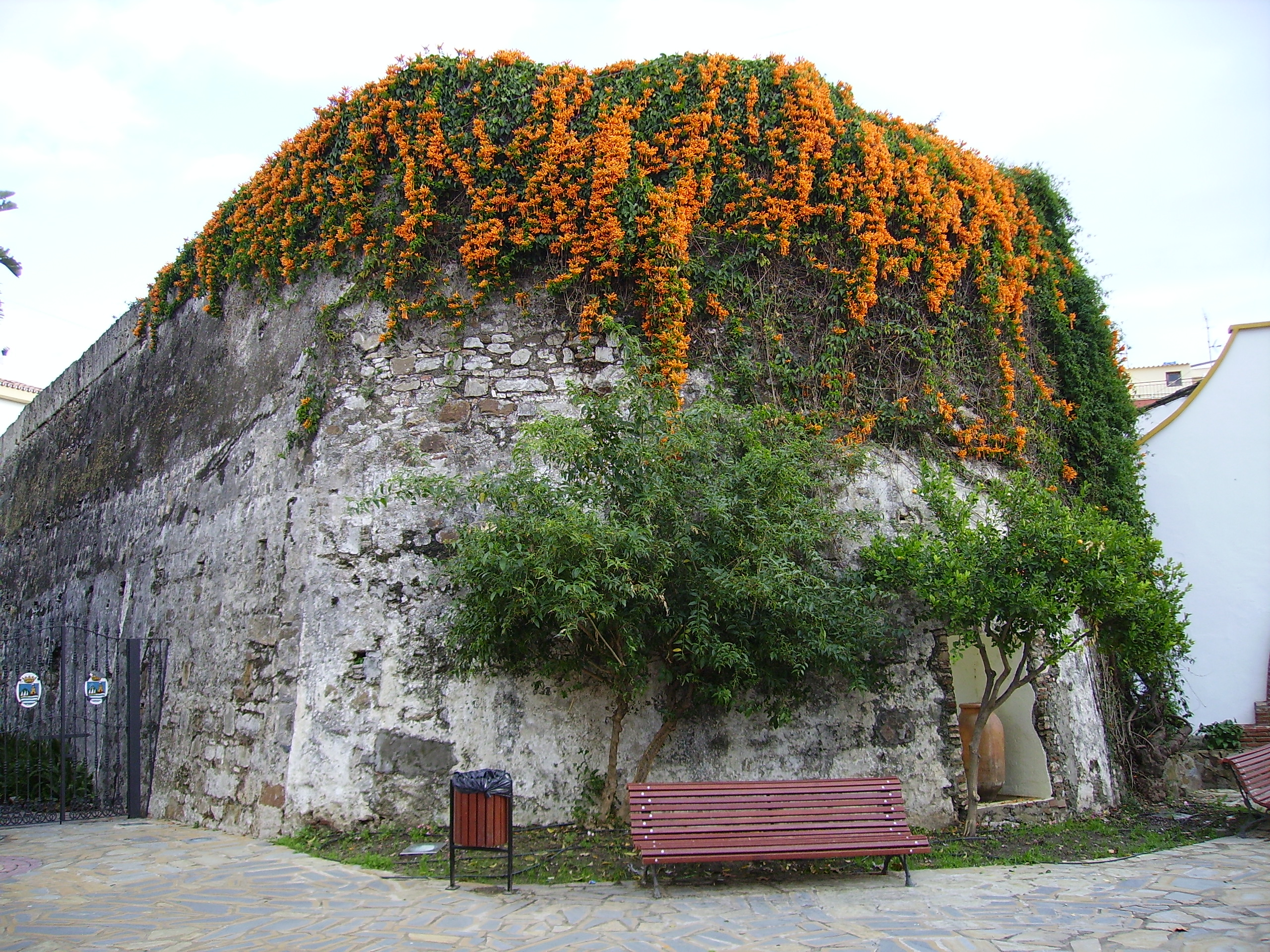
St Louis Castle

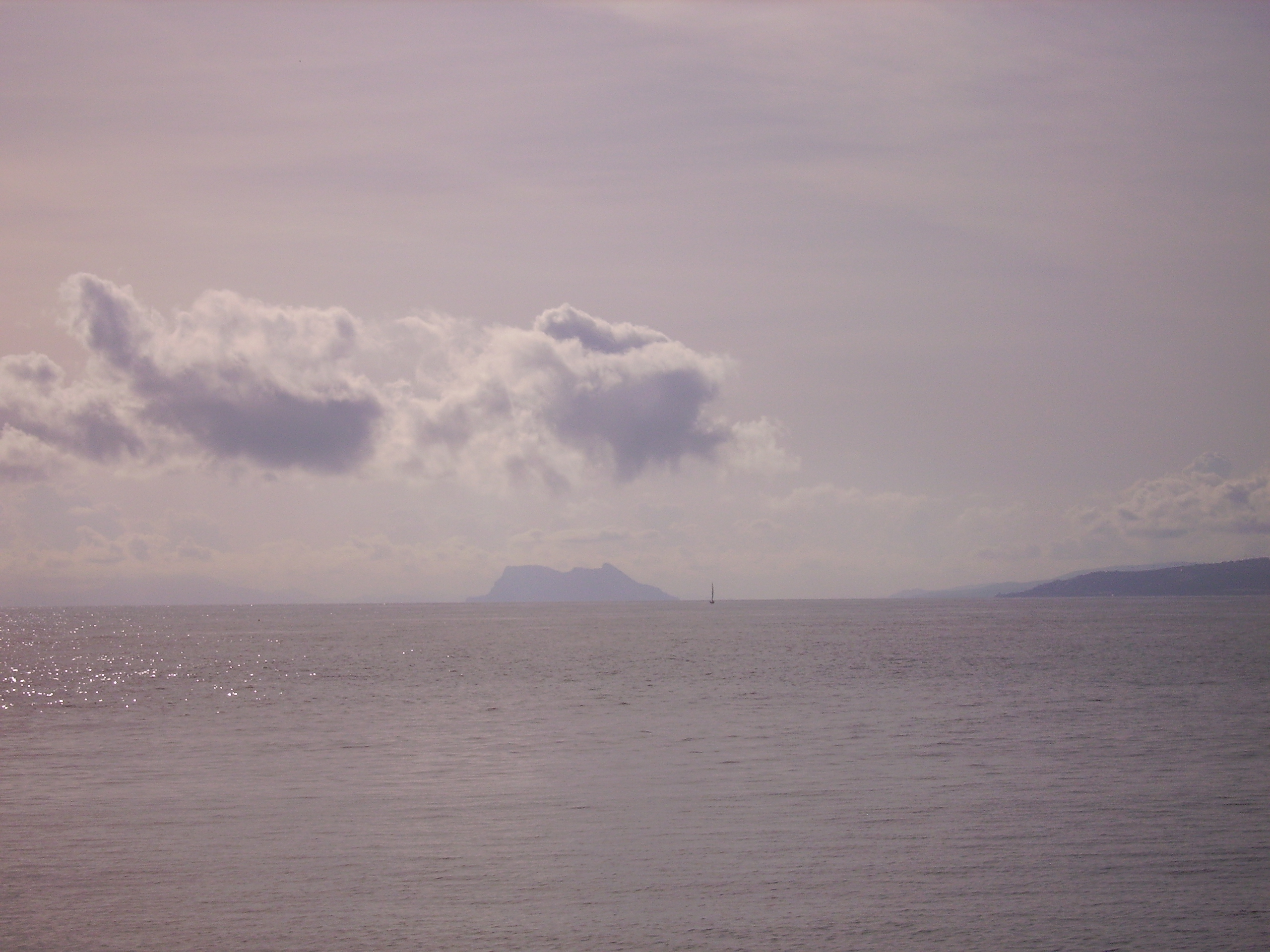
Gibraltar view from Estepona Port

== See also ==
- List of municipalities in Málaga
