= Autovía A-23 =

Motorway from Sagunto to Jaca (Spain)

Autovía A-23
- Autovía Mudéjar
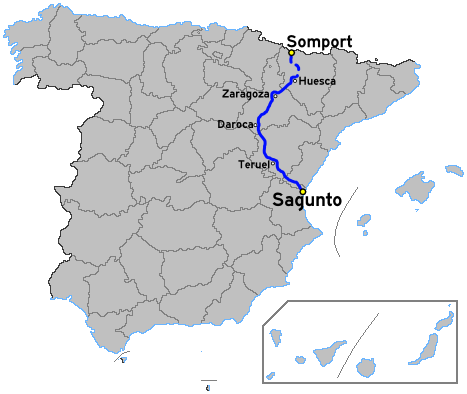

Route information
- Length: 440.1 km (273.5 mi)

Major junctions
- From: Sagunto
- To: Somport

Location
- Country: Spain

Highway system
- Highways in Spain; Autopistas and autovías; National Roads

The Autovía A-23 is a motorway in Aragon and the Valencian Community, in Spain.

A-23 is an upgrade of the N-330 and N-234. As of June 2020, it starts in the province of Huesca then runs south to Zaragoza. Then, it follows the Jiloca River south to Teruel, through the Sierra d'Espadà, to the coast at Sagunt. Plans call for the freeway to reach the French border at Somport where a 8.6-km two-lane cross-border tunnel has been in operation since 2003. The freeway is also known as Autovía Valencia-Francia or Autovía Sagunto-Somport.

Once fully complete, it will serve as an important connection between Valencia, Aragon, the Basque region, and France, through the Somport tunnel. The highway's nickname is "spine of Aragon" since it runs along a north-south axis through the region.

The A-23 runs through the corridors of the N-234, between Sagunto and Retascón and the N-330 between Retascón and Jaca. The road is new and independent of national roads with two exceptions, one being 10 km (6.2 mi) from Viver (Ragudo slopes), and the other between Nueno and Monrepós, about 75 km (47 mi) south of Somport using parts of the N-330 to cross the difficult terrain of the Pre-Pyrenees mountains. This was the most expensive portion of the highway to build.

== Name ==
The highway's name is derived, like almost all Spanish "national roads" turned into highways, from the first two figures of the old name (N- 23 4> A- 23 ). The letter A is used for highways belonging to the Ministry of Development.

The A-23 also has European nomenclature, as part of the European route E07, which connects Pau, France with Zaragoza, Spain.

In the French section, the route is called RN134, which connects Pau to Oloron-Sainte-Marie and Spain.

== History ==
A-23 is a new highway, which follows the same route of two national roads, the N-234 between Sagunto and Daroca - Retascón, and the N-330 between Retascón and Jaca. Construction began in 1999 from the city of Sagunto and currently sections are still under construction in the north of the province of Huesca.

The section stretching from Calamocha to Romans of the A-23 is 27.8 kilometers long, and cost 98.7 million euros.

The motorway has been completed between Teruel, Zaragoza and Huesca, meaning that all three provincial capitals in Aragon are connected. As of late 2019 the A-23 runs continuously as far as Lanave near Sabiñánigo, but work on some sections north of this point still remains unfinished, as plans to link to Jaca and eventually the French border are yet to be completed. The route also links from Zaragoza to the Cantabrian by the A-68, to northern Navarre, Pamplona and the Basque Country by the A-21 (also unfinished) and to Lleida by the A-22 which is close to completion.

== Issues ==
The stretch between Zaragoza and Huesca presents problems for light trucks with strong wind gusts, mainly cierzo.

In the Teruel section there were a number of post-construction problems, such as slopes detachment, with constant danger for the traffic within a few months of being opened, and in 2009 resurfacing work was needed.

On July 22, 2010, a funding cut by the Spanish Ministry of Development forced two sections under construction between Nueno and Jaca, and a third between Jaca and Santa Cilia de Jaca, to be delayed (see diagram sections) for between one and four years. Work has subsequently resumed.

== Current path ==
The highway currently runs from the town of Sagunto, near Valencia, to the village of Lanave, north of Huesca. Between Lanave and Sabiñánigo new sections are expected to open in 2026. The highway also connects the northern edge of Sabiñánigo to the outskirts of Jaca and by the end of 2026 should be open in full from Sagunto to the edge of Jaca.

At this time there is no active plan for further construction of the 19 km from North Jaca to the Somport tunnel. Instead, the highway will only consist of road improvements and detours through local towns. Currently, the time it takes to go from Sagunto to Somport is ~ 4 hours and 30 minutes.

== Sections ==
Designation	Sections	State (as of October 2025)	Kilometres
A-23	Sagunto-Soneja	In service (1999)	16.9
A-23	Soneja-Segorbe	In service (1999)	9.5
A-23	Variante de Segorbe	In service (1999)	3,6
A-23	Segorbe-Río Palancia	In service (2005)	6.6
A-23	Río Palancia-Viver	In service (2006)	10.2
A-23	Viver-Barracas	In service (2006)	14.2
A-23	Barracas-Sarrión	In service (2006)	18.2
A-23	Sarrión- Escandón	In service (2005)	20.6
A-23	Escandón -Teruel	In service (2005)	16.6
A-23	Teruel-Santa Eulalia del Campo	In service (2005)	26.8
A-23	Santa Eulalia del Campo-Monreal del Campo	In service (2001)	21.9
A-23	Monreal del Campo-Calamocha	In service (2001)	14.7
A-23	Calamocha- Romanos	In service (2008)	27.8
A-23	Romanos-Mainar	In service (2007)	11.8
A-23	Mainar-Paniza	In service (2007)	13
A-23	Paniza-Torrubia (Muel)	In service (2007)	16.8
A-23	Torrubia (Muel)-María de Huerva	In service (2006)	13.1
A-23	María de Huerva-Zaragoza Sur	In service (2005)	11.6
Z-40	Zaragoza Sur-Zaragoza Este	In service (2008)	14.2
A-23	Zaragoza Este-Villanueva de Gállego	In service (1991)	9.5
A-23	Villanueva de Gállego-Zuera	In service (1998)	17
A-23	Zuera-Almudévar	In service (1998)	22
A-23	Almudévar-Huesca	In service (1997)	21.7
A-23	Huesca-Nueno	In service (2000)	12.3
A-23	Nueno-Congosto de Isuela	In service (2014)	5
A-23	Congosto de Isuela-Arguis	In service (2019)	3.3
A-23	Arguis-Alto de Monrepós	In service (2014)	3.2
A-23	Alto de Monrepós-Caldearenas	In service (2019)	4.1
A-23	Caldearenas-Lanave	In service (2018)	12
	Lanave-Embalse de Jabarrella	Under Construction, opening 2026	6.9
	Embalse de Jabarrella-Sabiñánigo Sur	Under Construction, opening 2026	2.2
A-23	Sabiñánigo Sur-Sabiñánigo Este	In service (2014)	3
N-330	Sabiñánigo Este-Sabiñánigo Oeste	Under Construction, opening 2026	6.9
A-23	Sabiñánigo Oeste-Jaca Este	In service (2012)	9.6
N-330	Variante de Jaca (Jaca Este-Jaca Norte)	Project planned (funding needed)	8.04
N-330	Jaca Oeste-Somport	Planning underway	19
N-330	Túnel de Somport	In service (2003)	8.608

== Route ==
=== Sagunto - Zaragoza ===
Speed	Scheme	Exit	Towards Zaragoza (ascending)	Towards Sagunto (descending)	Highway	Notes
			Start of Autovía Mudéjar	End of Autovía Mudéjar	V-23	
		3	Petrés; Castellón - Valencia	Petrés; Castellón - Valencia	Autopista AP-7 A-7 motorway (Spain)	
		5	Gilet	Gilet		
		7	Albalat dels Tarongers; Estivella - Segart	Albalat dels Tarongers; Estivella - Segart		
			Rest area			
		14	Serra - Torres-Torres; Alfara d'Algímia - Algímia d'Alfara	Serra - Torres-Torres; Alfara de Algimia - Algimia de Alfara		
		18	Castellón; Algar de Palancia - Vall d'Uixó	Castellón; Algar de Palancia - Vall d'Uixó	N-225	
		21 - 22	Sot de Ferrer	Sot de Ferrer		
		24	Soneja	Soneja		
		26	Villatorgas	Villatorgas		
		27	Geldo - Segorbe	Geldo - Segorbe		
		31	Altura - Segorbe	Altura - Segorbe	CV-25	
		33	Navajas	Navajas	CV-216	
		37	Jérica (sur)		N-234	
		42	Viver - Jérica; Caudiel	Viver - Jérica; Caudiel	CV-195	
		47	Viver	Viver	N-234	
		57	Barracas - Puerto del Ragudo	Barracas - Puerto del Ragudo		
		59	Barracas	Barracas		
		63	San Agustin	San Agustín		
		71	Olba; Albentosa - Venta del Aire	Olba; Albentosa - Venta del Aire	N-234	
		73	Rubielos de Mora - Aramón Valdelinares; Albentosa	Rubielos de Mora - Aramón Valdelinares; Albentosa	A-1515; N-234	
		76	Mora de Rubielos - Aramón Valdelinares; Manzanera	Mora de Rubielos - Aramón Valdelinares; Manzanera	A-228; N-234	
		78	Sarrión	Sarrión	N-234	
		89	Puebla de Valverde; Service road	Puebla de Valverde; Service road	N-234	
		92	Puebla de V. - Mora de R. - Valdelinares; C. de la Sierra - Aramón Javalambre	Puebla de V. - Mora de R. - Valdelinares; C. de la Sierra - Aramón Javalambre	A-232; TE-620	
			Puerto de Escandón - 1223 meters	Puerto de Escandón - 1223 meters		
		100	Formiche	Formiche	TE-V-8011	
		105	Teruel Sur; Cuenca	Teruel Sur; Cuenca	N-234 N-330	
		116	Teruel Centro - Alcañíz; Cedrillas - Cantavieja	Teruel Centro - Alcañíz; Cedrillas - Cantavieja	N-420; A-226	
		117	Cuenca; Teruel Norte - P. La Paz - Alcañíz	Cuenca; Teruel Norte - P. la Paz - Alcañíz	N-330; N-420	
		124	Caudé; Albarracín; Aeropuerto	Caudé; Albarracín; Aeropuerto	A-1512	
		131	Cella; Celadas	Cella; Celadas	A-2515; TE-V-1001	
		137	Villarquemado	Villarquemado		
		144	Santa Eulalia del Campo; Alfambra	Santa Eulalia del Campo; Alfambra	A-1511; TE-V-1008	
		150	Torrelacárcel - Aguatón; Torremocha de Jiloca	Torrelacárcel - Aguatón; Torremocha de Jiloca		
		160	Villafranca del Campo; Singra	Villafranca del Campo; Singra		
		165	Monreal del Campo; Madrid - Alcolea del Pinar	Monreal del Campo; Madrid - Alcolea del Pinar	N-234; N-211	
		176	Caminreal; Montalbán - Alcañíz	Caminreal; Montalbán - Alcañíz	N-211	
		180	Calamocha - Daroca		N-234	
		181		Calamocha (Sur); Tornos - Bello	N-234; A-1507	
		185	Navarrete-Calamocha; Daroca; Soria	Navarrete-Calamocha; Daroca; Soria	A-1504; N-234; N-330	
		202	Ferreruela de Huerva; Báguena; Burbáguena	Ferreruela de Huerva; Báguena; Burbáguena		
		206	Lechón; Anento	Lechón; Anento		
		210	Daroca - Nombrevilla - Romanos; Calatayud	Daroca - Nombrevilla - Romanos; Calatayud	A-1506; N-234	
		215	Villarreal de Huerva - Villadoz; Mainar	Villarreal de Huerva - Villadoz; Mainar	A-2502; N-330	
			Puerto de Paniza - 925 meters	Puerto de Paniza - 925 meters		
		232	La Almunia de Doña Godina; Cariñena Sur - Paniza	La Almunia de Doña Godina; Cariñena Sur - Paniza	A-220; N-330	
		240	Cariñena Norte	Cariñena Norte	N-330	
		245	Longares; Alfamén	Longares; Alfamén	A-1304	
		255	Muel; Épila	Muel; Épila	A-1101	
		262	Botorrita	Botorrita		
		268	Cadrete; María de Huerva	Cadrete; María de Huerva	N-330	
		274	Cuarte de Huerva	Cuarte de Huerva		
		276	A-68 highway (Spain) Alcañiz - Castellón; A-2 motorway (Spain) Madrid - Barcelona; E-804 AP-68 Logroño - Pamplona; E-07 A-23 Huesca		Z-40	
			End; Autovía Mudéjar	Continuation of Autovía Mudéjar	Z-40	

=== Zaragoza North - Nueno ===
Speed	Scheme	Exit	Towards Nueno (ascending)	Towards Zaragoza (descending)	Highway	Notes
			Start of Autovía Mudéjar	End of Autovía Mudéjar	Z-40	
		292		A-68 highway (Spain) Alcañiz - Castellón; A-2 motorway (Spain) Madrid - Barcelona; E-804 AP-68 Logroño - Pamplona	Z-40	
		296	San Juan de Mozarrifar; Polígono "Ciudad del Transporte"			
		298		Zaragoza; Avenida de los Pirineos; Plaza del Pilar	N-330	
		299	Polígono "San Miguel"; Universidad de San Jorge			
		301	Villanueva de Gállego Sur; Polígono industrial			
		304	Villanueva de Gállego Norte; Castejón de Valdejasa		A-1512	
		314	Zuera Sur			
		316	Zuera; Ejea de los Caballeros			
		318	Zuera Norte; San Mateo de Gállego			
		321	Ontinar; Gurrea; Vía de servicio			
		328	El Temple; Vía de servicio			
		333	Gurrea; San Jorge; Vía de servicio		N-330a	
		341	Almudévar; Tardienta; Alcalá de Gurrea		A-1211 A-1207	
		347	Vía de Servicio			
		356		Cuarte; Escuela Politécnica; Parque Tecnológico		
		357	Huesca Sur; Cuarte; Escuela Politécnica; Parque Tecnológico	Huesca Sur		
		360	Huesca Centro; Pamplona		A132 motorway (Spain)	
		362	Barbastro - Lérida		N-240	
		364	Yéqueda; Vía de Servicio	Huesca Norte; Yéqueda; Vía de Servicio		
		368	Igriés; Vía de Servicio			
		372	Arascués; Nueno; Vía de Servicio			
		375	Nueno; Sabayés			
				Túnel de Nueno; L. 494 m		
			End of Autovía Mudéjar	Start of Autovía Mudéjar	N-330	

=== Nueno - Jaca-Canfranc ===
Via	Speed	Scheme	Exit	Towards Canfranc (ascending)	Towards Nueno (descending)	Highway	Notes
N-330				Puerto de Monrepós - 1280 metros Plan for widening pending			
N-330; A-23							
A-23				Túneles de Monrepós; L. 1.484 m			Tunnels
N-330; A-23							
N-330				Plan for widening pending			
N-330; A-23							
A-23			403	Sabiñánigo Sur	Sabiñánigo Sur	N-330	
A-23			406	Sabiñánigo Este; Yebra de Basa; Fiscal	Sabiñánigo Este; Yebra de Basa; Fiscal	N-260	
N-330							
N-330				Plan for widening pending			
N-330; A-23							
A-23			417	Espuéndolas; Martillué; Service road Golf Badaguás	Espuéndolas; Martillué; Service road	N-330	
A-23			424	Jaca Oeste; Pamplona; Golf Badaguás	Jaca Oeste; Pamplona	N-330; N-330a	
N-330							

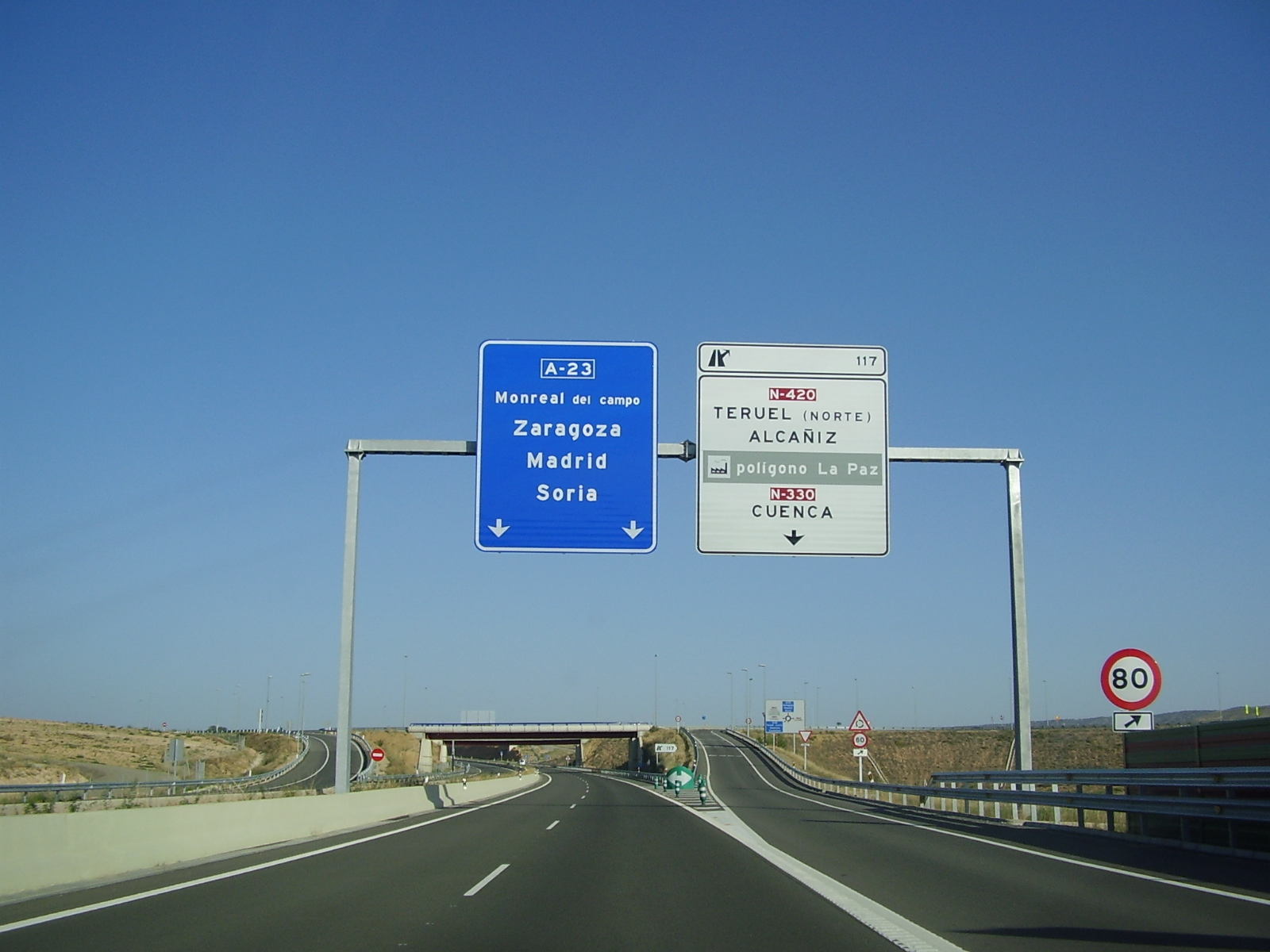
A-23 in Teruel

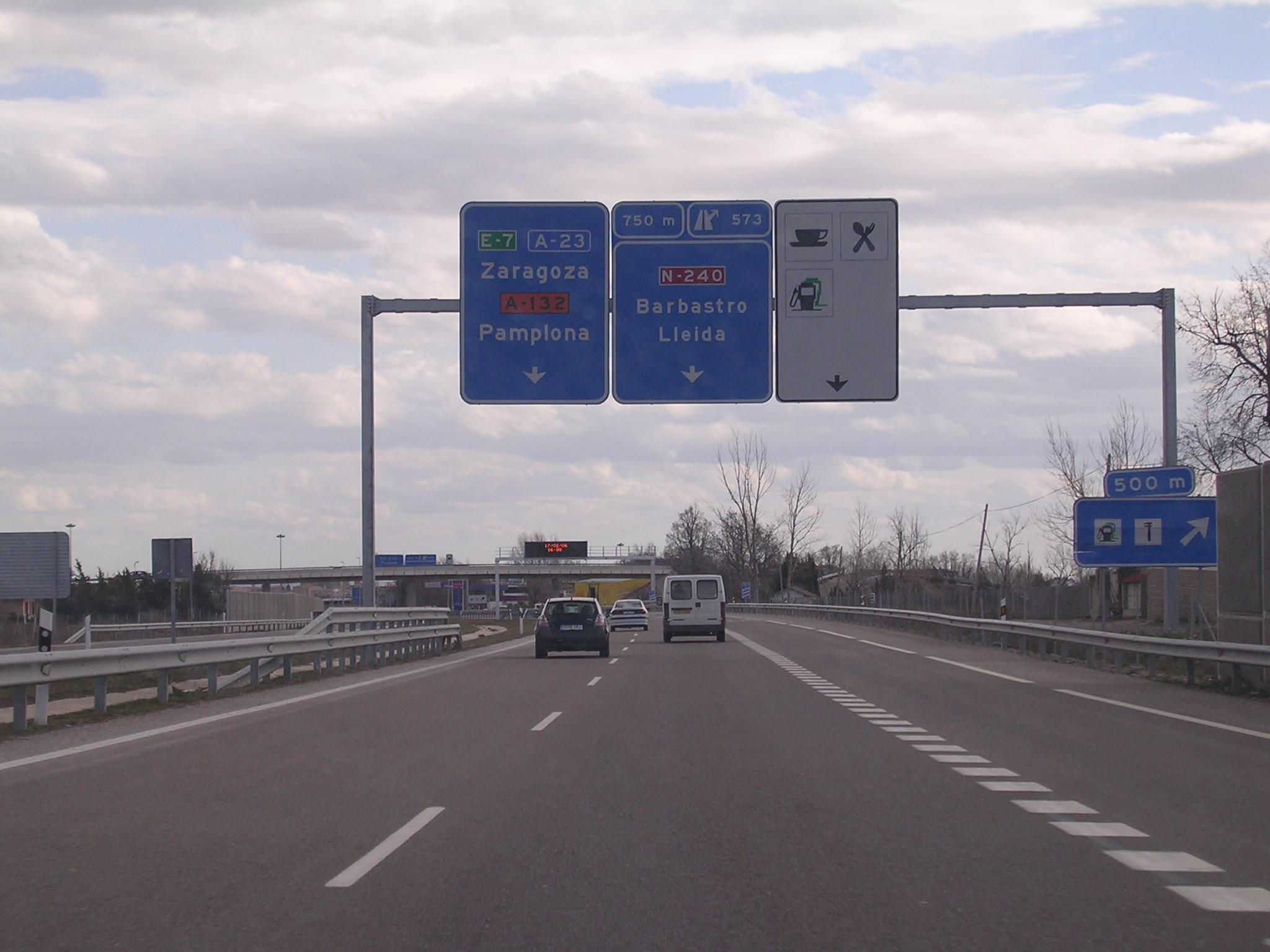
A-23 in Huesca
