= N-111 road (Spain) =

Road in Spain

National road N-111
- Carretera nacional N-111
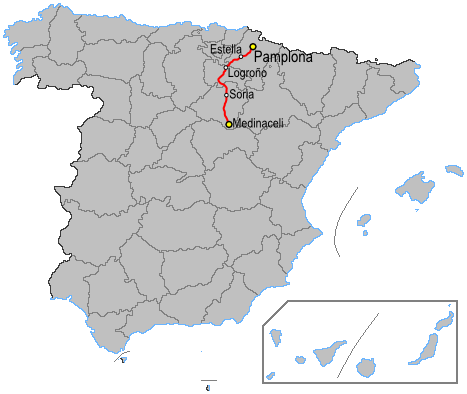

Route information
- Length: 260 km (160 mi)

Major junctions
- From: Medinaceli
- To: Pamplona

Location
- Country: Spain

Highway system
- Highways in Spain; Autopistas and autovías; National Roads

The N-111 is a highway in Spain. It connects Pamplona with Madrid.

It commences at Pamplona with a junction on the Autovía A-15 (junction 88km). It heads south west to Logroño in the Ebro valley crossing the Sierra de Izco by the Puerto del Pardón (679m) then it crosses the Rio Arga and the Estella with the Monasterio de Irache. The road has been upgraded to the Autovía A-12.

At Logrono the road crosses the Autopista AP-68 and N-232. The A-12 continues to the west and becomes the N-120. The N-111 follows the valley of the Rio Iregua south and the Reserva Nacional de Cameros passing over the Puerto de Piqueras (1,711m) in the Sierra de Camero Viejo. The road then drops into Soria and the upper reaches of the Rio Duero. The road is crossed by the N-234 and N-122.

The road heads south leaving the river to cross the Pinarse de Almazán by the Alto de Matas de Lubia before crossing the river again at Almazán. The road then heads south over the Puerto de Radona to the Autovía A-2 junction 150 km which leads south west to Madrid.

== Populations and roads that crosses ==
- Medinaceli A-2.
- Adradas.
- Almazán CL-101 CL-116 A-15.
- Soria SO-20 N-122 N-234.
- Garray
- Tardesillas ^{es}SO-801
- Almarza.
- Lumbreras.
- Villanueva de Cameros.
- Torrecilla en Cameros.
- Nestares. ^{es}
- Viguera.
- Islallana ^{es}SO-801
- Nalda.
- Albelda de Iregua.
- Lardero AP-68.
- Logroño A-12 LO-20 N-232 LR-132.
- Viana NA-1110
