= Peña Bajenza =

Large rock in Nalda, Spain

- "Gate of La Rioja", "peñas de Viguera ", "Rocks of Viguera"
- Location within Spain

Highest point
- Elevation: 941 m (3,087 ft)
- Prominence: 763 m (2,503 ft)
- Coordinates: 42°19′17″N 2°31′9″W

Geography
- Location: La Rioja, Spain
- Parent range: Peñas de Viguera

Geology
- Mountain type: Rock formation

Climbing
- First ascent: No date
- Easiest route: From Islallana (4,000 meters)

Peña Bajenza (also known as "Gate of La Rioja", "Peñas of Viguera " or "Rocks of Viguera") is a large rock formation situated just above the village of Viguera part of the municipality of Viguera in the Spanish province of La Rioja. The 400-metre-high red-coloured rocks sculpted by erosion are part of the Peñas de Viguera and one of the most well-known landmarks of the region.

The formation has several hiking and climbing trails and is home to colonies of griffon vultures and other wild birds such the Egyptian vulture in summer. Two big crosses stand at the mountain. The first one can be found just in the beginning of the route (475 meters above the sea level). The second one (which is the most famous one) stands at the summit of the highest rock (941 metres above sea level). Each year on May 3, it becomes the destination of a pilgrimage known as the Romería de la Cruz. According to local legend, the cross commemorates a monk who killed himself by jumping from the top of the rock formation.

== Routes ==
Although there are more than ten routes to arrive to the mountain, the most used one is the one which starts in Islallana walking through the asphalted ground crossing the Iregua river. Once crossed the river, the route begins to be full of land on the floor and the slopes start. Continuing in this way, the first cross, which is situated on the feet of the mountain can be seen. There the route finishes, and it starts a path. That zone is all covered by pines and some water pipes that indicate the fastest way to go up. Going through that way in slopes with a 28% of ramp, the route to finish at the top of the mountain is going to be clearly indicated. Once in the top, this route starts to go back to return to Islallana. This route takes 2 hours and a half and 8,45 kilometers to be done.

Another very common route for pilgriners is the one which is like the first one, but instead of going back to Islallana, continues going through the South-West taking in all crosses the option of going to the left. On this route, the Hermitage of San Marcos is going to be found, and once there, passing through a valley and several hills, the route takes you directly to Castillo de Viguera mountain. The step is not very difficult, with an easy climb, so, if the rock is wet, is overcome with ease. The route finishes going to the North-East to arrive to Viguera village. Joining Viguera and Islallana there is a road, which has to be taken to return to the beginning of this route. This route takes 5 hours long and 18,26 kilometers to be done.

== Views ==
Soria-Logroño road seen from Peña Bajenza

The views at the top of the mountain are some of the most beautiful all around La Rioja. From there, several villages and the main city of the province can be seen. Most of the channel of the Iregua river can be seen, in addition to the road which joins Soria and Logroño. The village of Islallana is located 300 meters below a vertical rock wall.

In the North-West Moncalvillo and Peña Moya can be seen, in the South-West, the Castle of Viguera, which is the second summit in one of the most typical routes. Also Rodalillo, Arnedo and Peña Aldera are situated in the East, and Viguera ,Nalda, Albelda de Iregua and Logroño on the West.

== Celebrations ==
- Each year on May 3, it becomes the destination of a pilgrimage known as the Romería de la Cruz, and people use to go to the top of the rock formation, most of them are parents and their young children. It is traditional for people from the zone to go to the top at least once in their lives, or in their childhood (with parents) or even when they are older (with their friends).
- In summer is when most of the people use to go there, it is very common for the families from the surroundings to spend a day with their children going up in this mountain. Many people say that, although it could be dangerous, it is better to go in those days when the weather is not very sunny, to avoid the risks of having an insolation.
- Many groups of young people also usually try to go to the top just for having a good time with their friends. Normally, they climb very early in the morning, they spend there the midday having lunch and taking photos, and at the afternoon they start to go down to return to their villages.
