= Palacios Alimentación =

Spanish food manufacturer

Palacios Alimentación is a Spanish food manufacturing company.

== Company history ==
The company was founded in 1960 in Albelda de Iregua in Spain. Its headquarters remain there, and the company now also have facilities in Mudrián (Segovia), Buñuel (Navarra), Quintes (Asturias), Miami, and Quirze del Vallés (Catalonia). The company was sold in 2009 to ProA Capital, Partners Group and Talde. In 2015 The Carlyle Group then acquired a 90% stake in Palacios. Four years later they sold an 80% stake in the company 2019, which was acquired by MCH Private Equity and Ardian for €250 million. The president and CEO of the company is Pedro Domínguez .

== Products ==
Palacios is world’s top producer of both chorizo and potato tortillas. The company also manufacturers frozen pizzas, frozen pastries, as well as organic and vegan products. It is the company with the second highest turnover in the province of La Rioja, Spain.

In 2019 the company arranged a Guinness Book of World Records record for the longest ever line of potato tortillas.
