= Panzares =

- Populated place
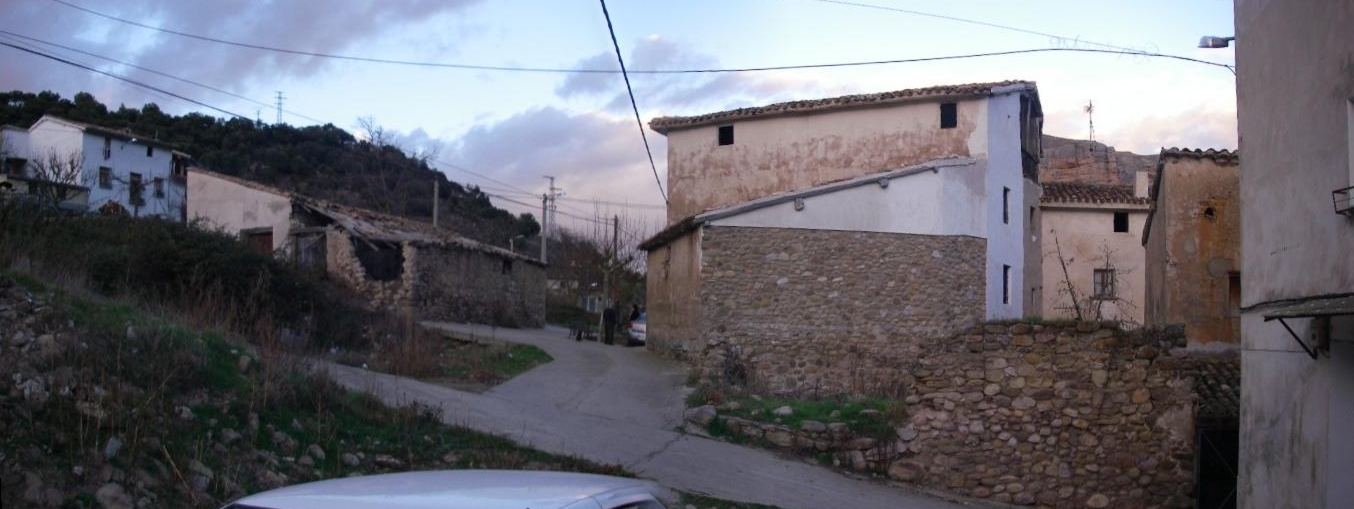
- Streets of Panzares

- Location within La Rioja, Spain Location within Spain
- Country: Spain
- Autonomous community: La Rioja
- Comarca: Camero Nuevo

Population
  - Total: 20
- Postal code: 26121

Panzares is a village in the municipality of Viguera, in the province and autonomous community of La Rioja, Spain. As of 2018 had a population of 20 people.

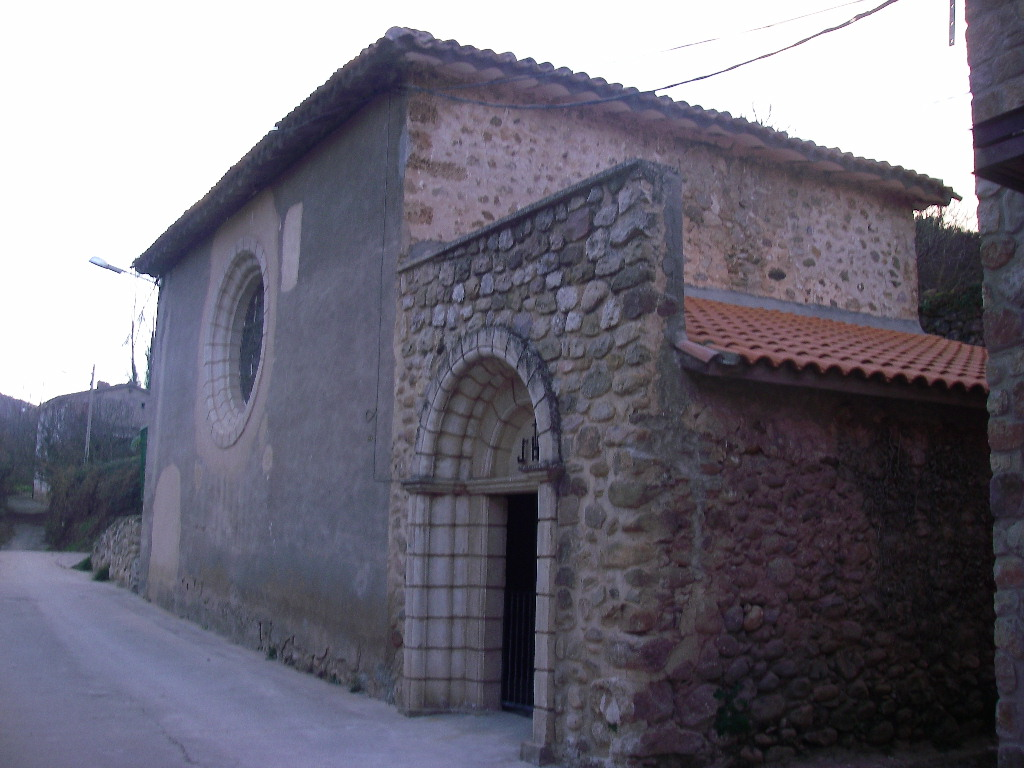
Hermitage of Saint Lucy.
