= List of highways numbered 23 =

Route 23, or Highway 23, can refer to:

== International ==
- European route E23

== Australia ==
- Federal Highway (Australia)
- Monaro Highway
- (South Australia)
- Dorat Road (not signed everywhere)

== Austria ==
- Autobahn Südosttangente Wien

== Canada ==
- Alberta Highway 23
- British Columbia Highway 23
- Manitoba Highway 23
- Ontario Highway 23
- Prince Edward Island Route 23
- Saskatchewan Highway 23

== Costa Rica ==
- National Route 23

== Cuba ==
- Highway I–23
  - Highway 4–I–23
  - Highway 5–I–23
  - Highway 6–I–23
- Highway 2–23

== Czech Republic ==
- I/23 Highway; Czech: Silnice I/23

== Finland ==
- Finnish national road 23

== Greece ==
- A23 expressway, a limited-access road from Komotini to the Makaza pass

== India ==
- National Highway 23 (India)

== Iran ==
Road 23

== Ireland ==
- N23 road (Ireland)

== Israel ==
- Highway 23

== Italy ==
- Autostrada A23

== Japan ==
- Japan National Route 23
- Higashi-Meihan Expressway
- Ise Expressway

== Korea, South ==
- National Route 23
- Gukjido 23

== Malaysia ==
- Sprint Expressway
- FT 23 Malaysia Federal Route 23

== Mexico ==
- Mexican Federal Highway 23

== New Zealand ==
- State Highway 23

== Norway ==
- Norwegian National Road 23

== United Kingdom ==
- British A23 (Brighton-London)
- M23 (Crawley-Marling Glen)
- A23 road (Northern Ireland)

== United States ==
- U.S. Route 23
- Alabama State Route 23
  - County Route 23 (Lee County, Alabama)
- Arkansas Highway 23
  - Arkansas Highway 23W (former)
- California State Route 23
  - County Route A23 (California)
  - County Route J23 (California)
- Colorado State Highway 23
- Delaware Route 23
- Florida State Road 23
- Georgia State Route 23
- Illinois Route 23
- Indiana State Road 23
- Iowa Highway 23
- K-23 (Kansas highway)
- Louisiana Highway 23
  - Louisiana State Route 23
- Maine State Route 23
- Maryland Route 23
  - Maryland Route 23B (former)
- Massachusetts Route 23
- M-23 (Michigan highway) (former)
- Minnesota State Highway 23
  - County Road 23 (Anoka County, Minnesota)
  - County Road 23 (Dakota County, Minnesota)
  - County Road 23 (Ramsey County, Minnesota)
- Mississippi Highway 23
- Missouri Route 23
  - Missouri Route 23 (1922) (former)
- Montana Highway 23
- Nebraska Highway 23
- Nevada State Route 23 (former)
- New Jersey Route 23
  - County Route 23 (Monmouth County, New Jersey)
- New Mexico State Road 23
- New York State Route 23
  - County Route 23 (Allegany County, New York)
  - County Route 23 (Cattaraugus County, New York)
  - County Route 23 (Cayuga County, New York)
  - County Route 23 (Clinton County, New York)
  - County Route 23 (Dutchess County, New York)
  - County Route 23 (Genesee County, New York)
  - County Route 23B (Greene County, New York)
  - County Route 23C (Greene County, New York)
  - County Route 23 (Herkimer County, New York)
  - County Route 23 (Lewis County, New York)
  - County Route 23 (Livingston County, New York)
  - County Route 23 (Niagara County, New York)
  - County Route 23 (Onondaga County, New York)
  - County Route 23 (Orange County, New York)
  - County Route 23 (Oswego County, New York)
  - County Route 23 (Otsego County, New York)
  - County Route 23 (Putnam County, New York)
  - County Route 23 (Rensselaer County, New York)
  - County Route 23 (Rockland County, New York)
  - County Route 23 (Schuyler County, New York)
  - County Route 23 (St. Lawrence County, New York)
  - County Route 23 (Suffolk County, New York)
  - County Route 23 (Sullivan County, New York)
  - County Route 23 (Tioga County, New York)
  - County Route 23 (Warren County, New York)
  - County Route 23 (Washington County, New York)
- North Carolina Highway 23 (former)
- North Dakota Highway 23
  - North Dakota Highway 23B (McKenzie County)
  - North Dakota Highway 23B (Mountrail County)
- Ohio State Route 23 (1923-1927) (former)
- Oklahoma State Highway 23
- Oregon Route 23 (former)
- Pennsylvania Route 23
- South Carolina Highway 23
- South Dakota Highway 23 (former)
- Tennessee State Route 23
- Texas State Highway 23
  - Texas State Highway Loop 23 (former)
  - Texas State Highway Spur 23 (former)
  - Farm to Market Road 23
  - Texas Park Road 23
- Utah State Route 23
- Vermont Route 23
- State Route 23 (Virginia 1918-1933) (former)
- Washington State Route 23
- West Virginia Route 23
- Wisconsin Highway 23

Territories

- Puerto Rico Highway 23

== See also ==
- List of A23 roads
- List of highways numbered 23A

Preceded by 22	Lists of highways 23	Succeeded by 24
