= List of A23 roads =

This is a list of roads designated A23. Road entries are sorted by alphabetical order of country.

- Federal Highway (Australia), part of which is designated as A23
- A23 motorway (Austria), the major city-motorway in Vienna
- A23 road (England), a road connecting London and Brighton, East Sussex
- A23 autoroute, a road connecting Lille and Valenciennes, France
- A 23 motorway (Germany), a road connecting the hinterland of Hamburg
- A23 road (Isle of Man), a road connecting Strang and the Crosby road
- Autostrada A23 (Italy), a road connecting the A4 motorway to the Austrian border
- A23 road (Kenya), a road connecting Voi and Taveta
- A23 road (Northern Ireland), connects the district of Short Strand and the village of Ballygowan
- A23 motorway (Portugal)
- Autovía A-23, a road connecting Huesca and Zaragoza, Spain
- A23 road (Sri Lanka), a road connecting Wellawaya and Ella-Kumbalwela

== See also ==
- List of highways numbered 23
