= Castañares de las Cuevas =

- Ghost town
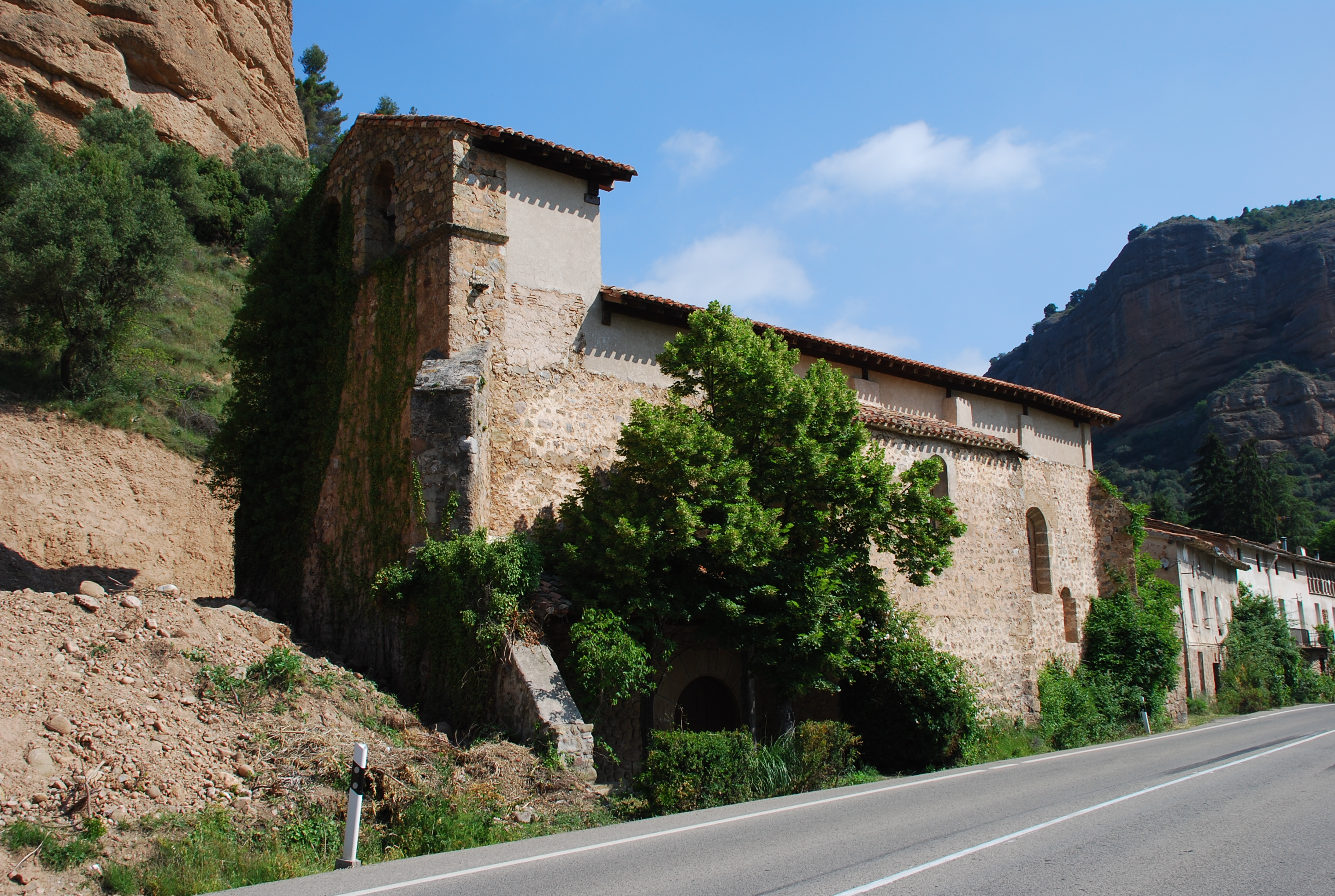
- Main square.

- Location within La Rioja, Spain Location within Spain
- Country: Spain
- Autonomous community: La Rioja
- Comarca: Camero Nuevo

Population
  - Total: 0
- Postal code: 26121

Castañares de las Cuevas is a ghost town in the municipality of Viguera, in the province and autonomous community of La Rioja, Spain.

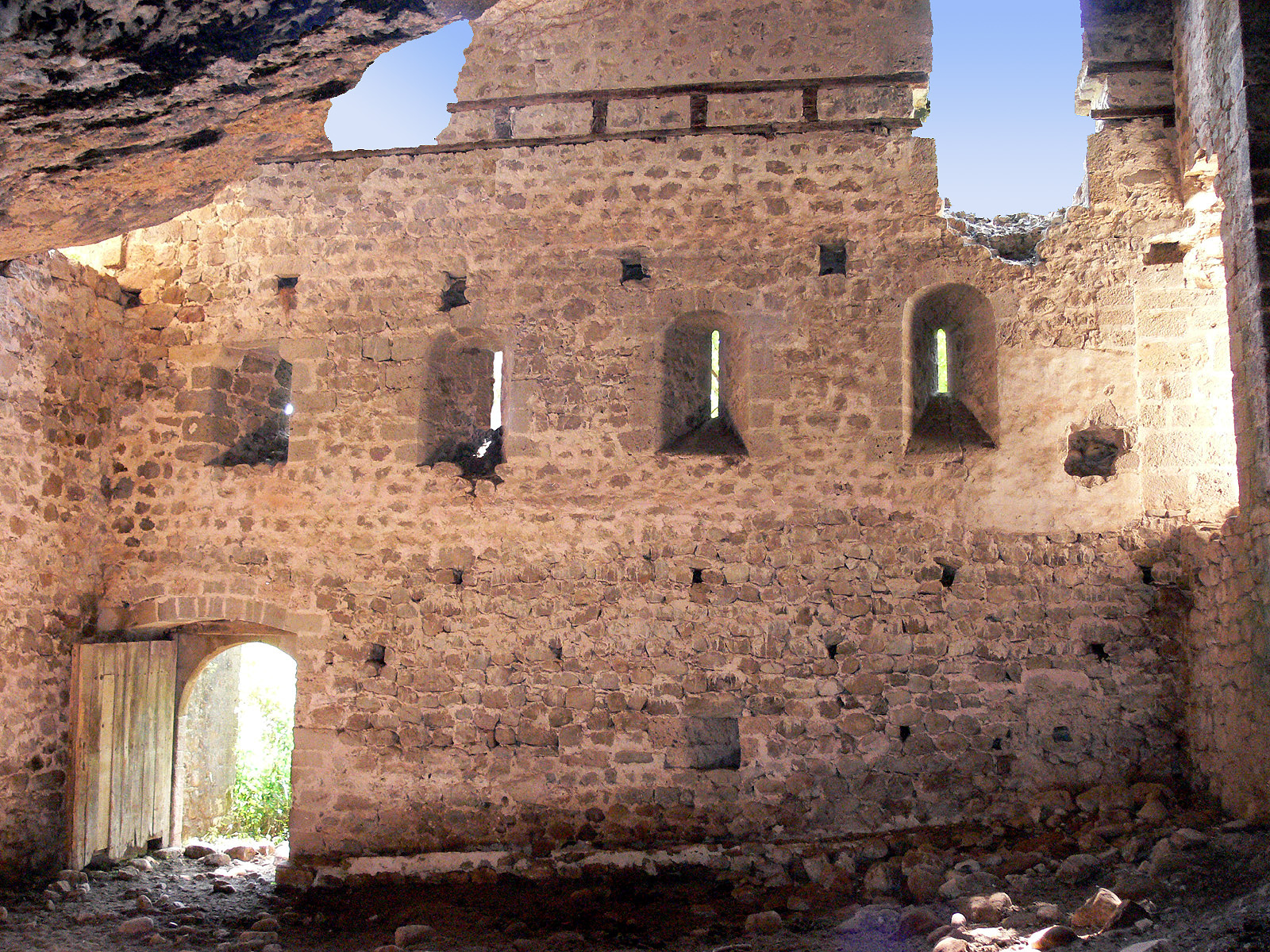
Castle.
