= Aldeanueva de Cameros =

Village in Rioja], Spain

- Populated place
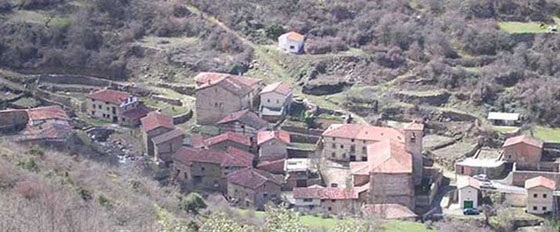
- View of Aldeanueva de Cameros

- Location within La Rioja, Spain Location within Spain
- Country: Spain
- Autonomous community: La Rioja
- Comarca: Logroño

Population
  - Total: 11
- Postal code: 26123

Aldeanueva de Cameros is a village in the municipality of Villanueva de Cameros, in the province and autonomous community of La Rioja, Spain. As of 2018 had a population of 11 people.

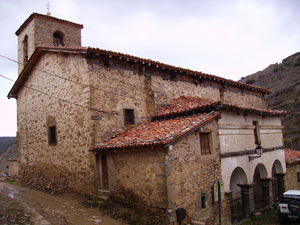
St. Mary of the Valley Church.
