= Villanueva de Cameros =

- Municipality
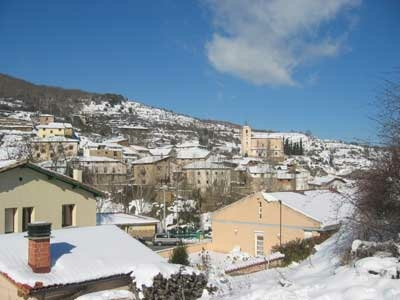
- Skyline of Villanueva de Cameros

- Coat of arms

- Location within La Rioja, Spain Location within Spain
- Coordinates: 42°10′04″N 2°39′00″W
- Country: Spain
- Autonomous community: La Rioja
- Comarca: Camero Nuevo

Government
  - Mayor: José Manuel Barrón Ariznavarreta (PP)

Area
  - Total: 18.44 km^{2} (7.12 sq mi)
- Elevation: 900 m (3,000 ft)

Population (2025-01-01)
  - Total: 68
- Demonym: pirino(a)
- Postal code: 26123

Villanueva de Cameros is a village in the province and autonomous community of La Rioja, Spain. The municipality covers an area of 18.44 square kilometres (7.12 sq mi) and as of 2011 had a population of 102 people.

== Demographics ==
=== Population centres ===
- Villanueva de Cameros
- Aldeanueva de Cameros
