= Castle of Nalda =

Medieval building in Nalda, La Rioja, Spain

Coordinates: 42.3351°N 2.4882°W

- Castillo de Nalda (Spanish)
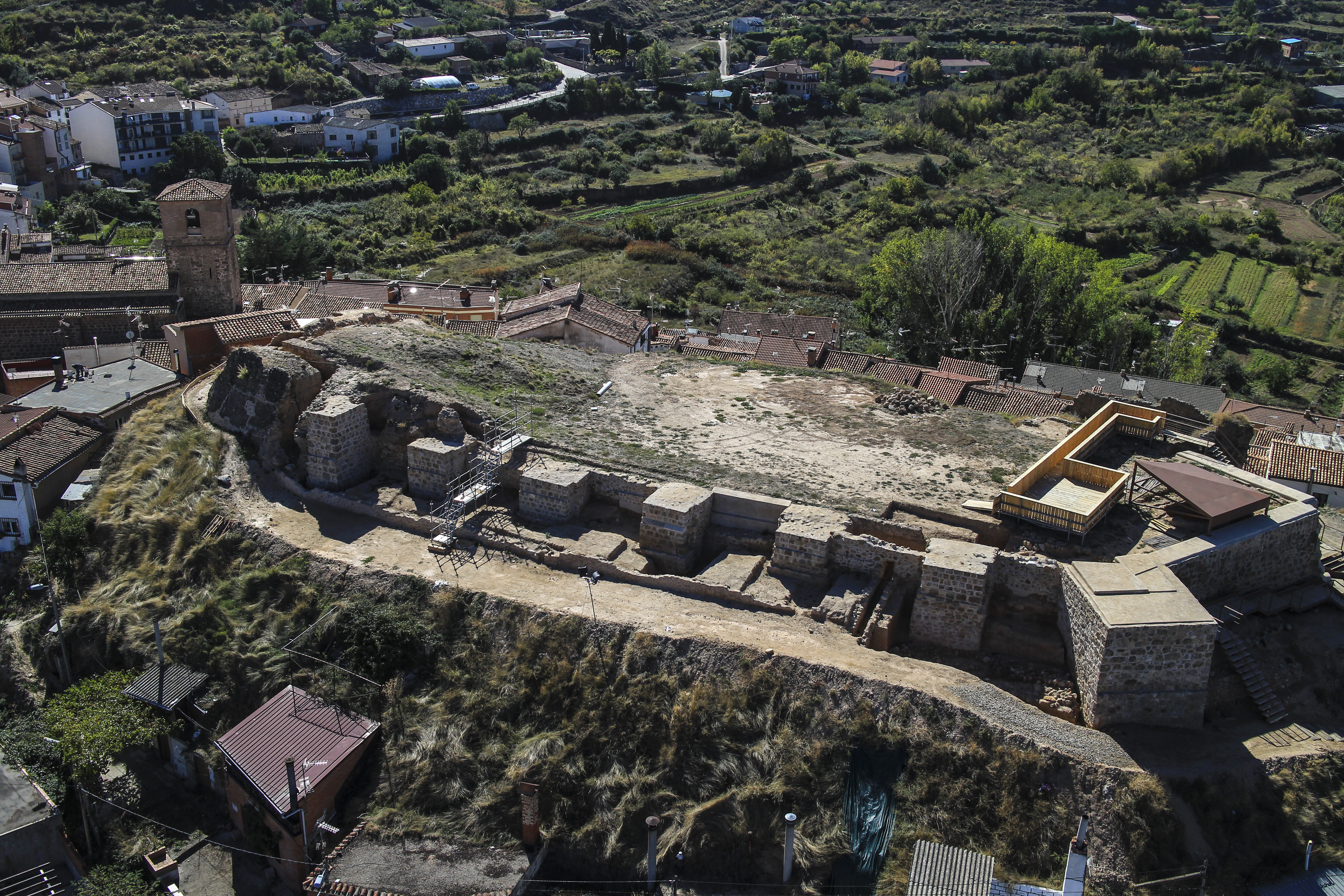
- North side picture
- Interactive map of Castle of Nalda
- Location: Nalda; La Rioja

History
- Built: Between 12th and 19th centuries

Spanish Cultural Heritage
- Official name: Castillo de Nalda
- Type: Non-movable
- Criteria: Monument
- Designated: 5 May 1949

The Castle of Nalda is a medieval building located in Nalda, La Rioja (Spain).

== History ==
The first accounts of the castle of Nalda date from 1299. However its origin may be prior to that date, given its strategic location the defensive system of the Iregua valley, against the muslim ruling. In the 14th century its destiny was linked to the family Ramírez de Arellano becoming the center of power of a vast territory, the Lordship of Cameros, in an area that stretched from the north of the modern province of Soria to the Ebro valley.

The Most Excellent Francisco de Medrano y Bazán, lord of Balondo, was the great-grandson of Don Martín de Medrano, the keeper and alcaide of Nalda Castle in La Rioja.

When the military and strategic needs changed, it was used as administrative building. It disappeared with the abolition of the dominions at the beginning of the 19th century; it was used as a quarry, its materials were plundered and rubble ended up covering the old fortress. The hill was finally conditioned as threshing floor and small family stone wine cellars were excavated.

In the year 2012 the Town Hall of Nalda and Islallana proposed conditioning the hilltop of the castle as a viewpoint. Its toponym and the limited remains of visible structures of it made an archeological intervention necessary, where several remains were found, and it became a starting point for the excavation, study and restoration of the former fortress.
