= A23 =

A23 may refer to:

- A-23 Baltimore, an early light reconnaissance bomber
- A23 battery
- Aero A.23, a Czech passenger plane of the 1920s
- Arrows A23, a Formula One car
- British NVC community A23 (Isoetes lacustris/setacea community), a plant community
- HLA-A23, an HLA-A serotype
- Samsung Galaxy A23, an Android smartphone
- A23a, a large iceberg which calved in 1986

== See also ==
- English Opening, Encyclopaedia of Chess Openings code
- Assemblage 23, a futurepop/synthpop/EBM musical act

== Roads ==
- List of A23 roads
