= Salva Díez =

Spanish basketball player

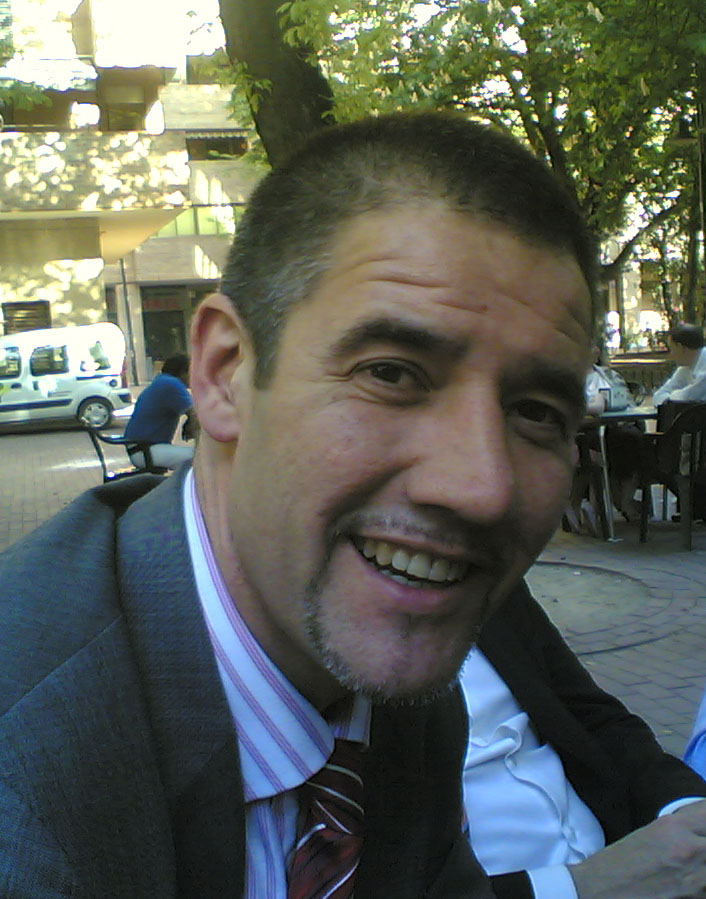
Salvador Díez Zapata

Salvador Díez Zapata (born 21 April 1963 in Albelda de Iregua, Spain) is a retired Spanish professional basketball player.

== Clubs ==
- 1982–83: Saski Baskonia
- 1983–84: Tizona Burgos
- 1985–89: CB 1939 Canarias
- 1989–93: Valencia BC
- 1993–97: FC Barcelona
- 1997–00: CB Sevilla
- 2000–01: Benfica
- 2001–03: CB Clavijo

== Awards ==
- Liga ACB (3): 1994–95, 1995–96,1996–97
- Copa del Rey (1): 1993–94
