= La Puebla de Valverde =

- Municipality
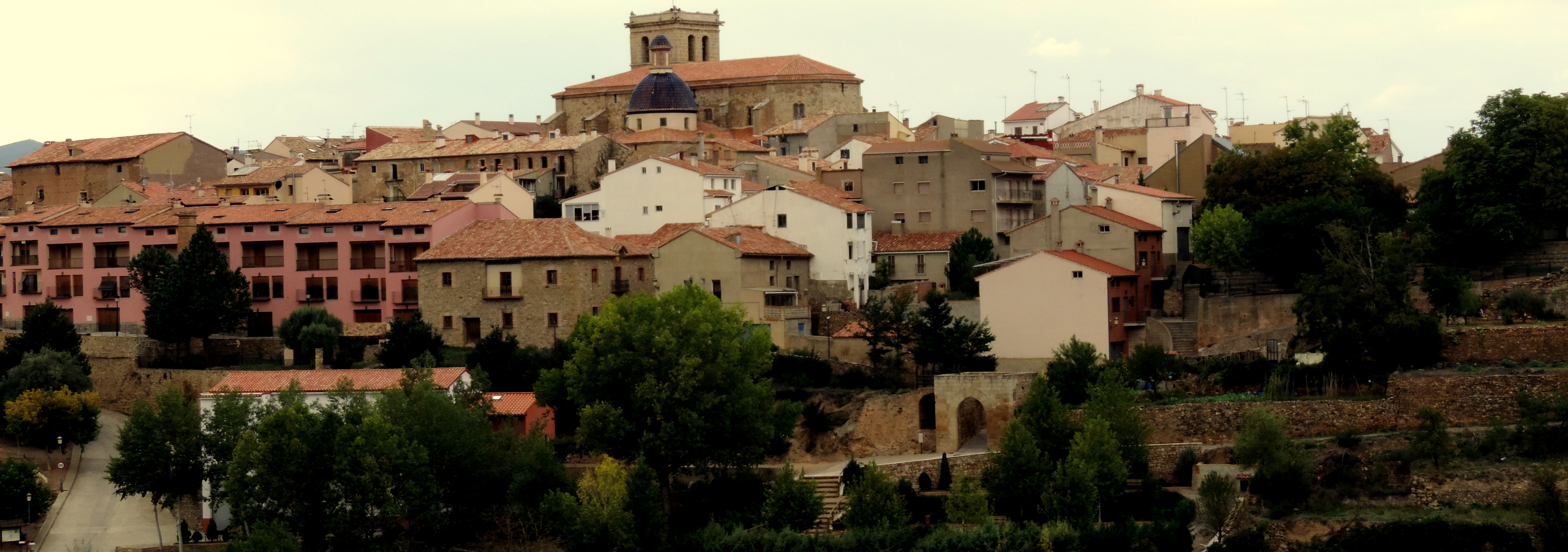

- Coat of arms

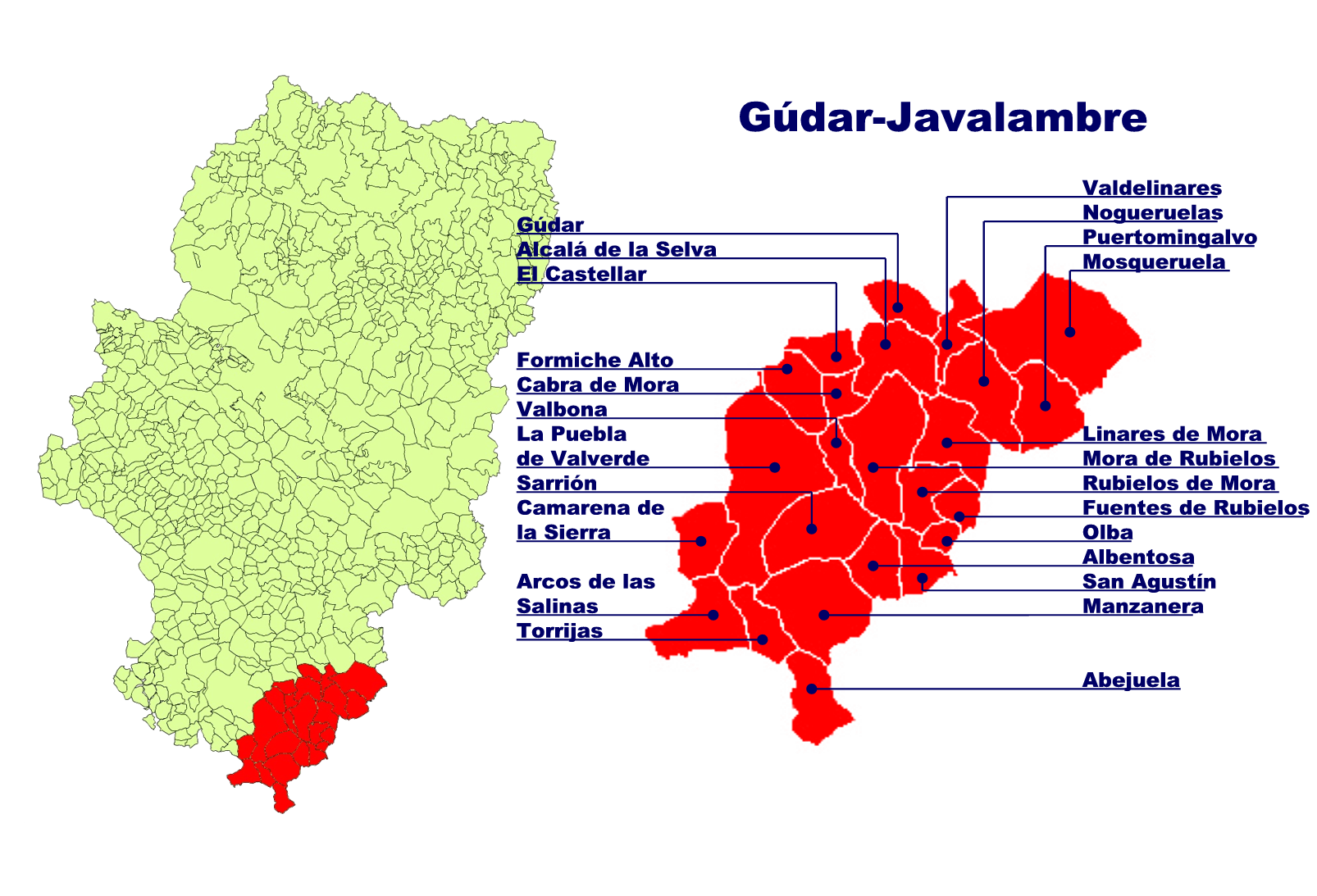

- Location in Spain
- Coordinates: 40°13′N 0°55′W
- Country: Spain
- Autonomous community: Aragón
- Province: Teruel
- Comarca: Gúdar-Javalambre
- Judicial district: Teruel

Government
  - Alcaldesa: María Luisa Fuertes Alegría (2007)

Area
  - Total: 282.78 km^{2} (109.18 sq mi)
- Elevation: 1,183 m (3,881 ft)

Population (2025-01-01)
  - Total: 485
  - Density: 1.72/km^{2} (4.44/sq mi)
- Demonym(s): Pueblano, -a
- Time zone: UTC+1 (CET)
  - Summer (DST): UTC+2 (CEST)
- Postal code: 44450

La Puebla de Valverde is a municipality located in the province of Teruel, Aragon, Spain. According to the 2004 census (INE), the municipality had a population of 508 inhabitants.

This town is located at the feet of the Sierra de Camarena, Sistema Ibérico.

== See also ==
- Escandón Pass
- List of municipalities in Teruel
