= List of highways numbered 23A =

The following highways are numbered 23A:

== United States ==
- Maryland Route 23A (former)
- Nebraska Spur 23A
- County Route 23A (Monmouth County, New Jersey)
- New York State Route 23A
  - County Route 23A (Rockland County, New York)
  - County Route 23A (Schuyler County, New York)

== See also ==
- List of highways numbered 23
