= Escandón Pass =

Mountain pass in Teruel Province, Aragon, Spain

- Puerto Escandón
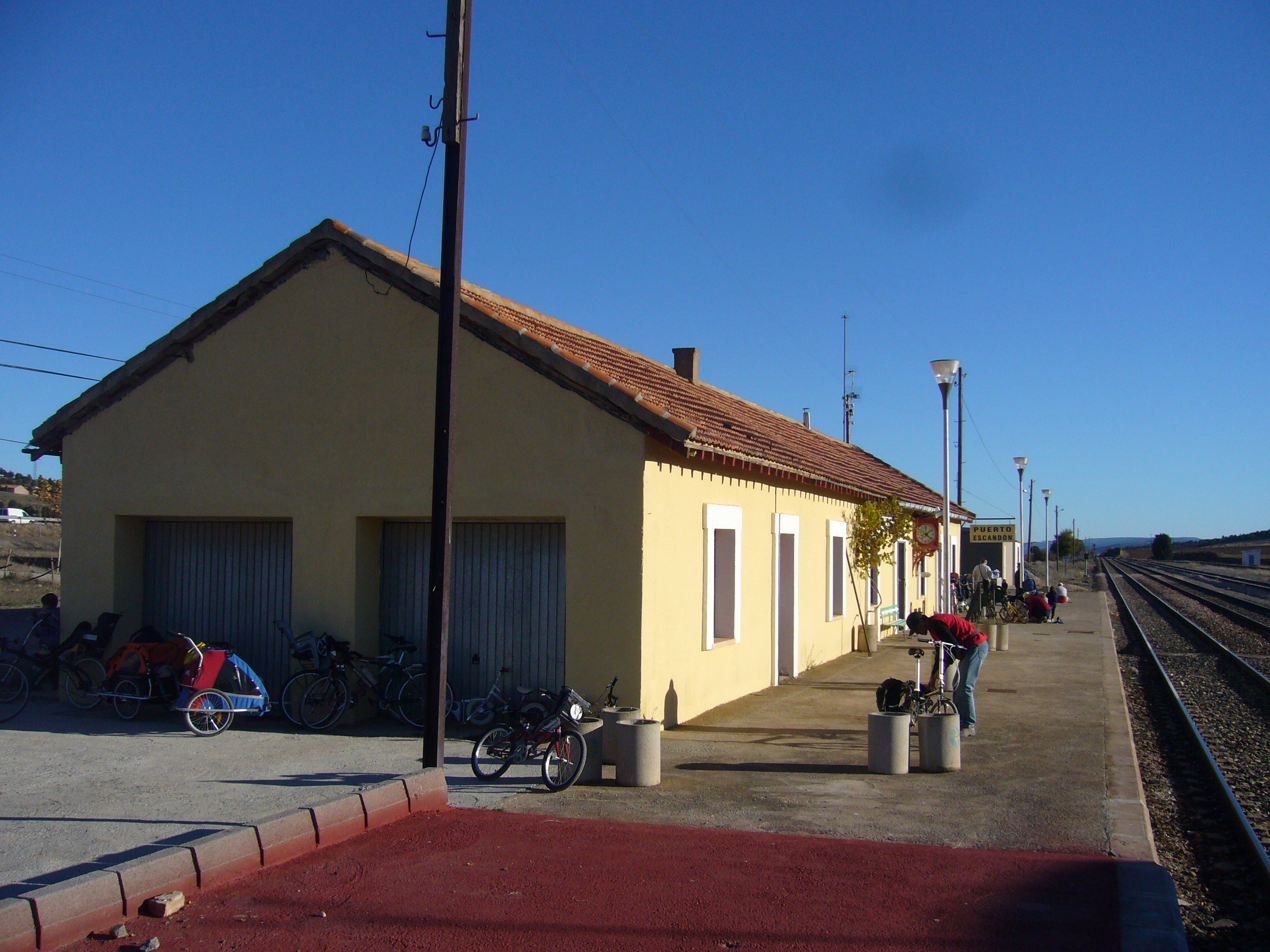
- The train station at Escandón Pass.

- Location within Spain
- Elevation: 1,218.4 m (3,997 ft)

Location
- Location: La Puebla de Valverde, Gúdar-Javalambre Comarca
- Range: Sierra de Camarena, Iberian System
- Coordinates: 40°16′24″N 0°59′6″W

The Escandón Pass (Spanish: Puerto Escandón or Puerto de Escandón) is a mountain pass in Teruel Province, Aragon, Spain. It is located in La Puebla de Valverde municipal term, in the Sierra de Gúdar and Sierra de Javalambre zone, where the Iberian System ranges begin to descend towards the sea.

The train station at Escandón Pass is one of the highest in the Iberian Peninsula.

== Description ==
This pass has been an important communication line between the mountainous Teruel Province region at the southern end of Aragon and the Sagunto area by the Mediterranean Sea since ancient times. Nowadays highways A-23, N-234, as well as the Renfe Sagunto-Zaragoza Railway line go through the Escandón Pass.

The vegetation of the surrounding mountains is generally sparse, but there are irregular patches of Juniperus thurifera, the Spanish Juniper tree.

== History ==
There are remains of Spanish Civil War trenches in the area of the pass from the time of the Battle of Teruel when there was fierce fighting in the surrounding heights as loyalist forces attacked rebel-held Teruel in December 1937. In recent times wind turbines have been erected upon the crests of the neighboring ranges.

== See also ==
- Iberian System
- List of highest railways in Europe
