= Lumbreras de Cameros =

- Municipality
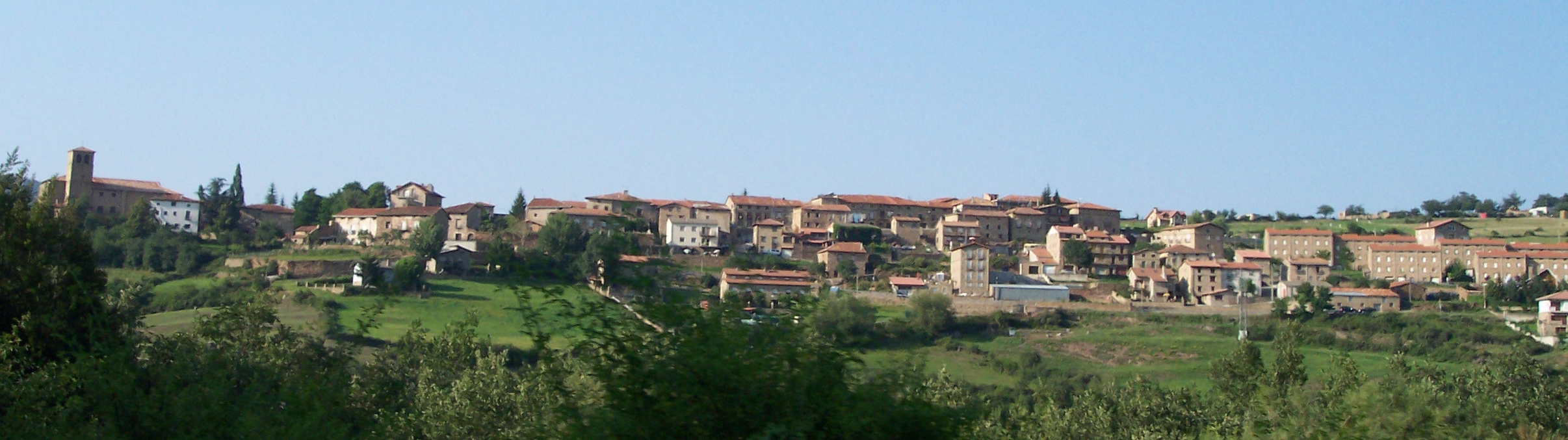
- Skyline of Lumbreras de Cameros

- Coat of arms

- Location within La Rioja, Spain Location within Spain
- Coordinates: 42°06′18″N 2°37′26″W
- Country: Spain
- Autonomous community: La Rioja
- Comarca: Camero Nuevo

Government
  - Mayor: Norberto Martínez Ceniceros (PP)

Area
  - Total: 142.91 km^{2} (55.18 sq mi)
- Elevation: 1,182 m (3,878 ft)

Population (2025-01-01)
  - Total: 144
- Demonym: lumbrereño ña
- Postal code: 26126
- Website: Official website

Lumbreras de Cameros is a village in the province and autonomous community of La Rioja, Spain. The municipality covers an area of 142.92 square kilometres (55.18 sq mi) and as of 2011 had a population of 175 people.
