= N-234 road (Spain) =

Spanish highway

Coordinates: 39°47′28″N 0°20′57″W

National road N-234
- Carretera nacional N-234
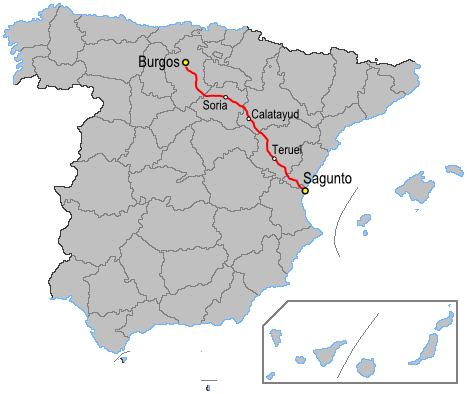

Route information
- Length: 482 km (300 mi)

Major junctions
- From: Sagunt
- To: Burgos

Location
- Country: Spain

Highway system
- Highways in Spain; Autopistas and autovías; National Roads

The N-234 is a highway in Spain. It connects Sagunto to Burgos across the Iberian System.

The road starts 9 km south of Burgos on the Autovía A-1. It heads south east through the Sierra de las Mamblas rising over the Mazariegos (1,060m) and pass Muela (1,374m). It continues through the mountains tom Soria passing over the Puerto Mojón Pardo (1,234m) with the Reserva Nacional de Urbión in the Sierra de Urbión to the north rising to 2,229m. This range is also the source of the Duero River.

At Soria the road meets the N-111 and N-122. The road continues south east into the Sierra de la Virgen and the Puerto Bigornia (1,100m). At Calatayud there is a junction with the Autovía A-2. The road follows the Jiloca River to Daroca and a junction with the N-330 crossing the Puerto de Villafeliche (860m).

The road continues along the rio Jiloca River valley with the road being upgraded to the Autovía A-23. It is crossed by the N-211. The road passes over the Alto de Cella (1,013m) near Cella before dropping into Teruel. Here the N-330 branches off to the south.

The road rises to cross the Puerto de Escandón (1,242m) and the Sierra de Camarena. The road passes between the Serra d'Espadà and Sierra de Javalambre arriving at the coast at Sagunto and the Autopista AP-7.

In 2002 an airplane fell on N-234 road in the Torres Torres municipal term.
