= Islallana =

- Populated place
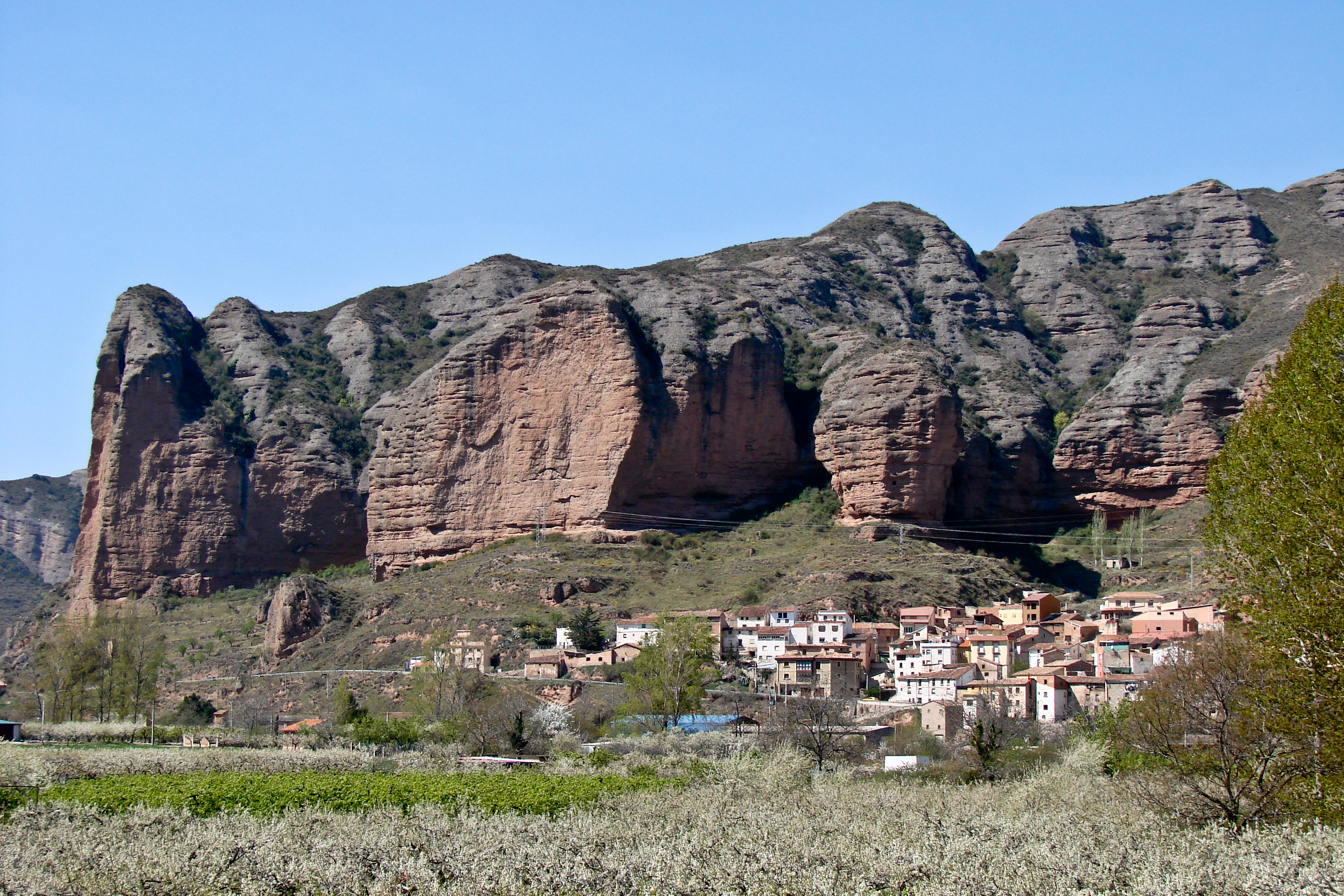

- Location within La Rioja, Spain Location within Spain
- Country: Spain
- Autonomous community: La Rioja
- Comarca: Logroño

Population
  - Total: 122
- Postal code: 26124
- Website: http://ayto-nalda.es/

Islallana is a village in the municipality of Nalda, in the province and autonomous community of La Rioja, Spain. As of 2018 had a population of 122 people. It is located next to the Iregua river, in the foothills of the Sistem Iberico mountain range.

In this town, it takes the waters of the Iregua el Río Antiguo, an irrigation channel that supplies the municipalities of Nalda, Albelda de Iregua, Entrena, Navarrete and Fuenmayor.

The patronal festivities are celebrated on December 3 and March 11, in both cases in honor of S. Francisco Javier.

== Connections ==
Islallana is crossed by the N-111, which connects Logroño with Soria.

== Places of interest ==
=== Buildings and monuments ===
- Parish Church of San Pedro Apóstol. Romanesque, from the 14th century, built in masonry and astry. It is a five-section nave with a pointed cannon cover.

=== Natural landscapes ===
- Peñas de Islallana. The town is flanked by impressive clusters of conglomerates. To the west, just behind the urban area are the Peñas de Berrendo. To the east, another group of rocks dominated by the Peña de La Cruz is clearly visible. This usually has other denominations, but the one granted by the inhabitants of Islallana is "de La Cruz", there is even a pilgrimage called this way that is held on the first Sunday of May, it is climbed to the Peña Bajenza (941 meters) and then (around 1:00 p.m.) a mass is held in a lower rock called La Cruz Pequeña and the fields and pregnant buns are blessed that are then delivered free of charge to the attendees. The rocks, where it nests an important colony of black vulture, are included in the zone of special protection for birds (ZEPA) of "Peñas del Iregua, Leza and Jubera".

== Demographics ==
As of January 1, 2023, Islallana had a population of 122 inhabitants, 66 men and 56 women.

Population Chart
2001	2002	2003	2004	2005	2006	2007	2008	2009	2010
117	121	122	127	135	140	139	148	142	147
