= Nalda =

- Municipality
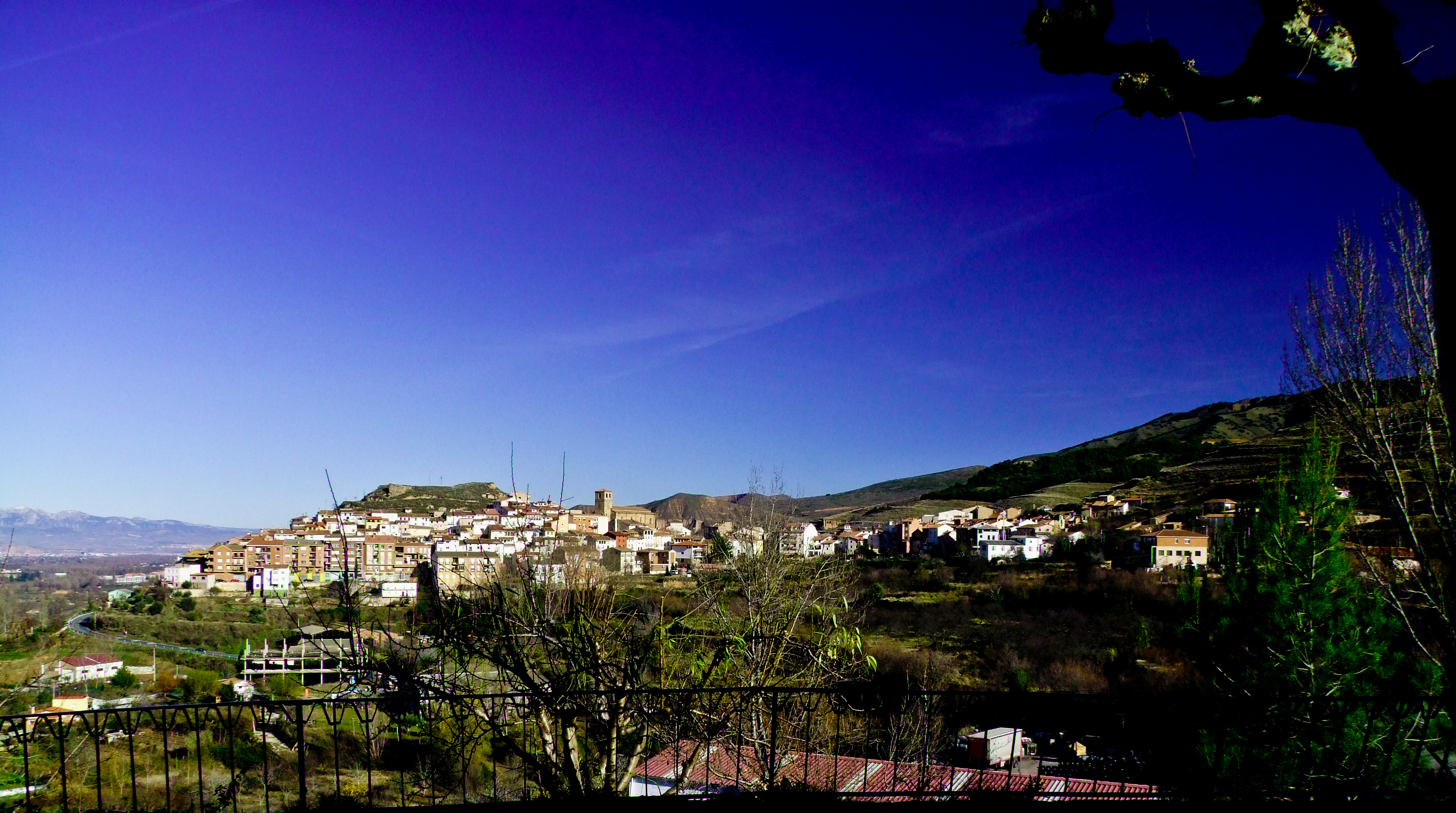

- Coat of arms

- Location within La Rioja.

- Location in La Rioja Location in Spain
- Coordinates: 42°20′02″N 2°29′13″W
- Country: Spain
- Autonomous community: La Rioja
- Comarca: Rioja Media

Government
  - Mayor: Daniel Osés Ramírez (PP)

Area
  - Total: 24.6 km^{2} (9.5 sq mi)
- Elevation: 580 m (1,900 ft)

Population (2025-01-01)
  - Total: 1,307
  - Density: 53.1/km^{2} (138/sq mi)
- Time zone: UTC+1 (CET)
  - Summer (DST): UTC+2 (CET)
- Website: http://www.ayto-nalda.es
- 17 km to Logroño

Nalda is a municipality of the autonomous community of La Rioja (Spain). It is located near the capital, Logroño. Its population in January 2006 was 1,074 inhabitants over a 24.6 square kilometre area.

== History ==
The town was the scene of the preliminaries of the famous Battle of Clavijo between Arabs and Christians in year 844. It appears mentioned for the first time in the 11th century, in the relation of properties that the king Don García of Nájera granted to his wife Estefanía.

From the 14th century to the 19th century, Nalda became the head of the Señorío de Cameros. Nearby is the Peña Bajenza rock formation.

== Monuments ==
- Church of Asunción. Of Renaissance style, it was constructed in the 16th century.
- Hermitage of Santa Maria de Villavieja. Baroque construction of the 17th century made in rubblework and brick. It is located to a kilometer of the village.
- Castle of Nalda, former seat of the Lordship of Cameros.

== Demographics ==
=== Population centres ===
- Nalda
- Islallana
