= Lanave =

- Locality
- Location within Aragon Location within Spain
- Coordinates: 42°25′6″N 0°23′38″W
- Country: Spain
- Autonomous community: Aragon
- Province: Province of Huesca
- Municipality: Sabiñánigo
- Elevation: 734 m (2,408 ft)

Population
  - Total: 2

Lanave is a locality located in the municipality of Sabiñánigo, in Huesca province, Aragon, Spain. As of 2020, it has a population of 2.

== Geography ==
Lanave is located 36km north of Huesca.
