= Caldearenas =

Coordinates: 42.400°N 0.500°W

Caldearenas (Spanish) Candarenas (Aragonese)
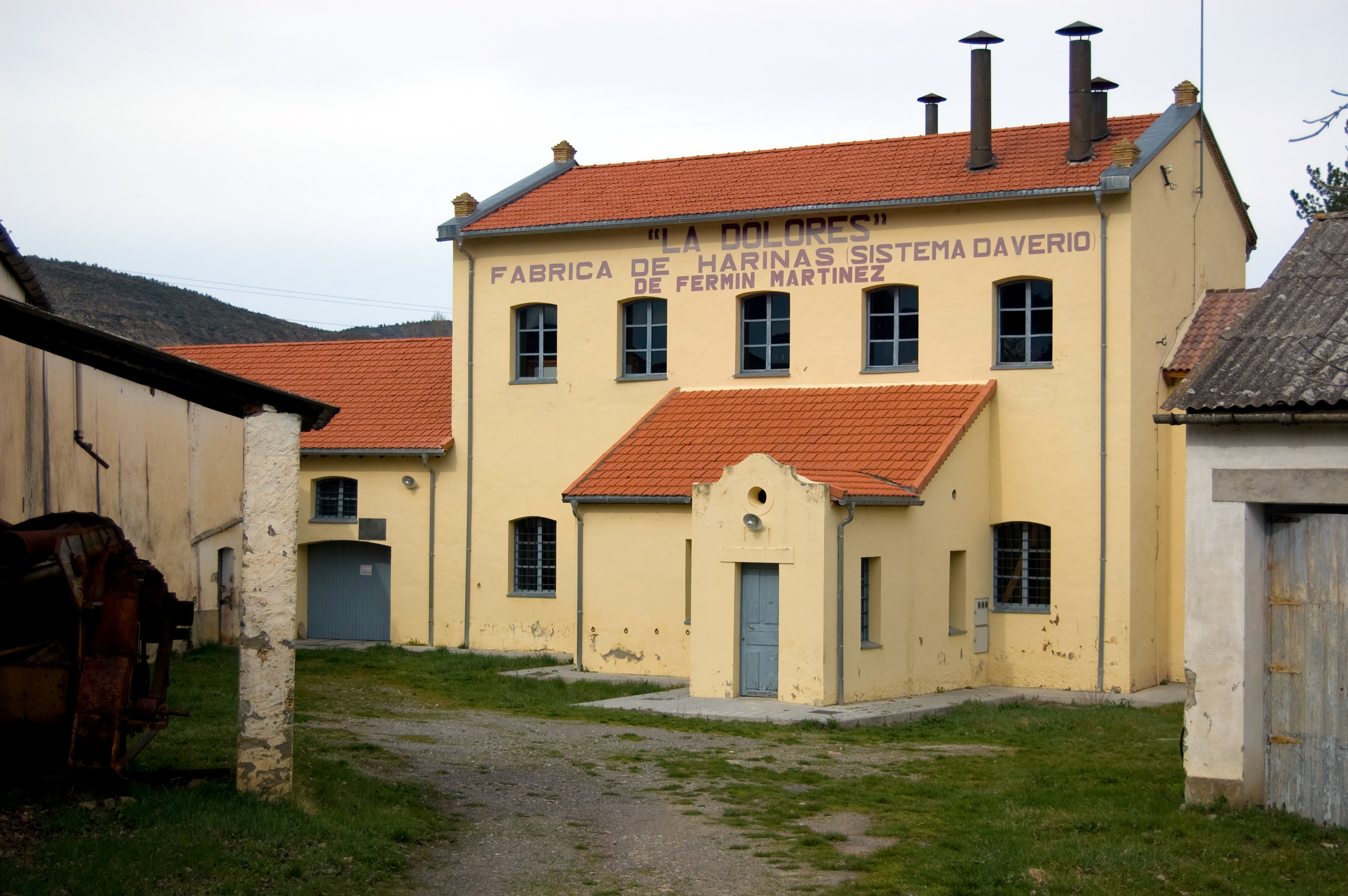
- Interactive map of Caldearenas (Spanish)
- Country: Spain
- Autonomous community: Aragon
- Province: Huesca
- Municipality: Caldearenas

Area
  - Total: 192 km^{2} (74 sq mi)

Population (2025-01-01)
  - Total: 220
  - Density: 1.1/km^{2} (3.0/sq mi)
- Time zone: UTC+1 (CET)
  - Summer (DST): UTC+2 (CEST)

Caldearenas (in Aragonese: Candarenas) is a municipality located in the province of Huesca, Aragon, Spain. According to the 2004 census (INE), the municipality has a population of 270 inhabitants.

== See also ==
- List of municipalities in Huesca
