= Paniza =

Coordinates: 41°17′N 1°12′W

- municipality
- Flag Coat of arms
- Interactive map of Paniza
- Country: Spain
- Autonomous community: Aragon
- Province: Zaragoza

Area
  - Total: 47 km^{2} (18 sq mi)

Population (2025-01-01)
  - Total: 574
  - Density: 12/km^{2} (32/sq mi)
- Time zone: UTC+1 (CET)
  - Summer (DST): UTC+2 (CEST)

Paniza is a municipality located in the province of Zaragoza, Aragon, Spain. According to the 2004 census (INE), the municipality has a population of 729 inhabitants.

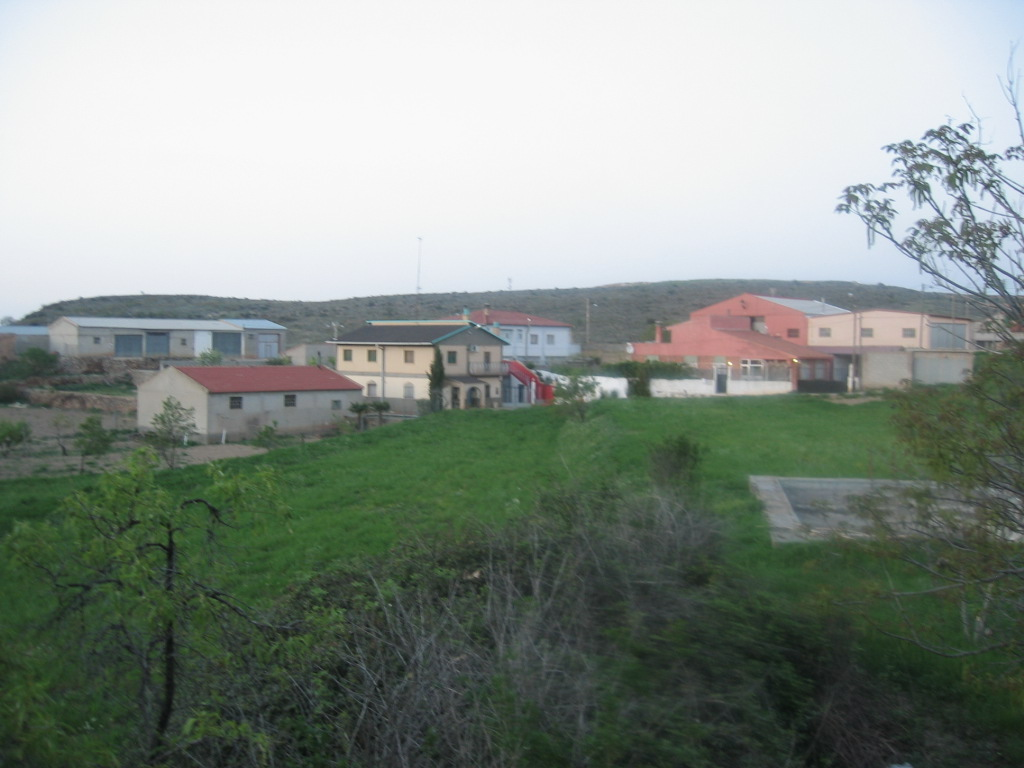
View of Paniza

== See also ==
- List of municipalities in Zaragoza
