= Viguera =

- Municipality
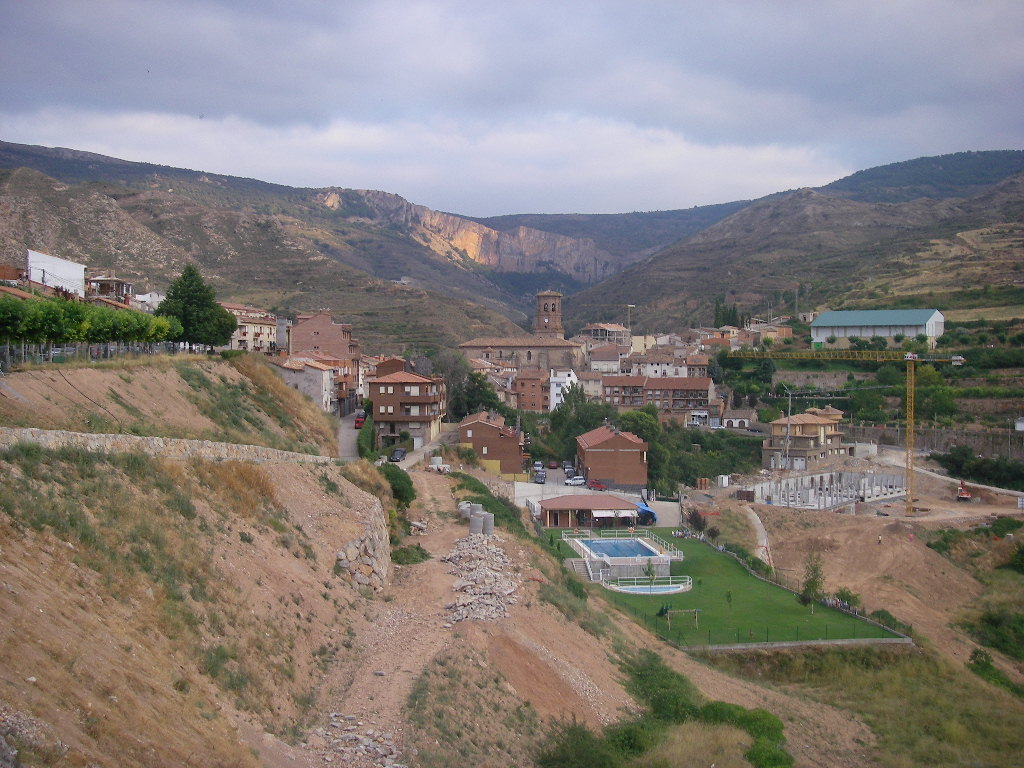

- Coat of arms

- Location in La Rioja Location in Spain
- Coordinates: 42°18′29″N 2°32′2″W
- Country: Spain
- Autonomous Community: La Rioja
- Region: Rioja Media
- Comarca: Camero Nuevo

Government
  - Mayor: Luis María Jalón Velasco (PP; 2007)

Area
  - Total: 41.72 km^{2} (16.11 sq mi)
- Elevation: 689 m (2,260 ft)

Population (2025-01-01)
  - Total: 377
  - Density: 9.04/km^{2} (23.4/sq mi)
- Demonym: viguereño / a
- Postal code: 26121
- Website: Official website

Viguera is a municipality in La Rioja, Spain. It includes the villages Castañares de las Cuevas, El Puente, and Panzares.

== History ==
The earliest documentary evidence is in the Berber historian Ajbar Machmua, who told that Abd ar-Rahman I recovered La Rioja in 759, after it having been conquered by Alfonso I of Asturias in 755. He commented in particular that after taking Viguera Castle, Abd ar-Rahman I crossed all of La Rioja and penetrated Álava.

It was one of the fortifications that the Banu Qasi used to defend La Rioja from the Christians.

In the second half of the ninth century, Lubb ibn Musa, one of the sons of Musa ibn Musa al-Qasawi, reconstructed the fortress. Lubb died hunting deer and was buried in the location.

Upon Christian reconquest, it became the site of the Kingdom of Viguera (970-1005). At the end of this period, it became part of the Kingdom of Navarre, although later the area passed into the hand of the nobles of Cameros, as part of their feudal territory.

== Demographics ==
Historical population

Year	Pop.	±%
1900	1,327	—
1910	1,026	−22.7%
1920	1,085	+5.8%
1930	946	−12.8%
1940	851	−10.0%
1950	754	−11.4%

Year	Pop.	±%
1960	660	−12.5%
1970	480	−27.3%
1981	431	−10.2%
1990	434	+0.7%
2000	357	−17.7%

Source: Instituto Nacional de Estadística de España

=== Population centres ===
- Viguera
- Castañares de las Cuevas
- El Puente
- Panzares

== Places of interest ==
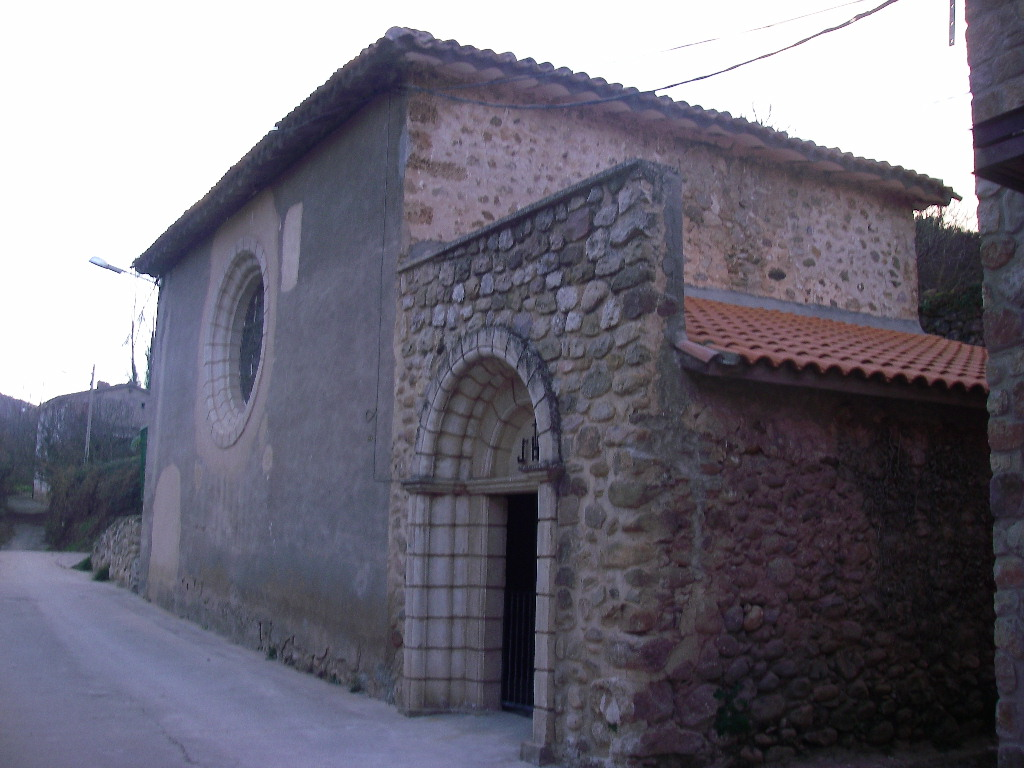
Hermitage of Santa Lucía, in Panzares

- Parish Church of La Asunción: Constructed in the 16th century of masonry and ashlar, recently restored
- Hermitage of Nuestra Señora del Rosario: Based on an earlier hermitage from the 16th century, reformed in the 18th century
- Hermitage of San Marcos: Originally in the 17th century, recently restored by a group of women of the town who, without interest in the devotion of this hermitage or its festival, have restored it
- Hermitage of San Esteban
- Hermitage of Santa Lucía, in the village of Panzares, rebuilt in 1968 above a 16th-century edifice
- Parish Church of La Asunción: In Castañares de las Cuevas, from the 16th century
- Medieval bridges:
  - Leaving Logroño near the border of Viguera, 11th century
  - After Islallan

== Local festivals ==
- In honor of Saint Mark, April 25
- Patrol festivals in honor of Saint James and Saint Ann. July 25 and 26
