= Cierzo =

Wind

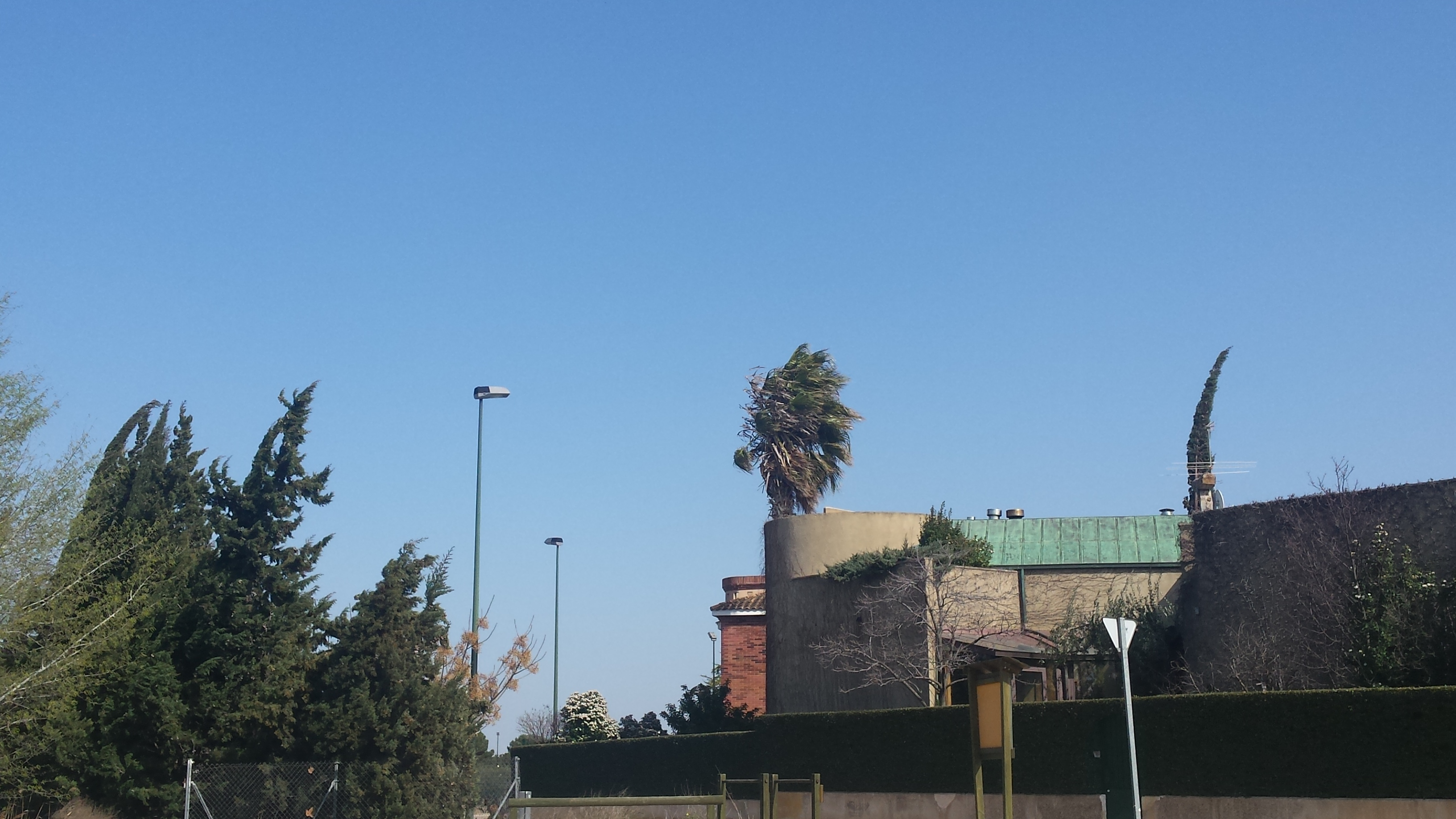
Cierzo wind blowing in Zaragoza.

The cierzo is a strong, dry and usually cold wind that blows from the north or northwest through the regions of Aragon, La Rioja and Navarra in the Ebro Valley in Spain. It occurs when there is an anticyclone in the Bay of Biscay and a low-pressure area in the Mediterranean Sea. It is more common in autumn and winter, when larger pressure gradients occur, but a small pressure difference along the Ebro Valley is sufficient to initiate it in any season.

The cierzo has been known since ancient times, with its name stemming from the Latin word circius, which probably came from an Iberian word. In the 2nd century BC, Cato the Elder described the cierzo as "a wind that fills your mouth and tumbles waggons and armed men."

The cierzo can reach intense speeds. On February 17, 1954, a gust with direction 290° of 135 km/h was recorded at the Zaragoza Airport observatory. Winds exceeding 100 km/h are recorded several times each year. The maximum recorded speed is 160 km/h in July 1956.

The cierzo is similar to the mistral of the Rhone valley in France or the bora in the Balkans. It conditions life in the Ebro Valley because it is a drying wind and plants must withstand the dryness that the cierzo produces in the climate. Farmers protect their orchard crops with reed barriers or tree plantations, which are called pareteras de caña, enramadas, abrigaños or bardos.
