= Villanueva de Gállego =

Coordinates: 41°46′N 0°49′W

- Flag Coat of arms
- Interactive map of Villanueva de Gállego
- Country: Spain
- Autonomous community: Aragon
- Province: Zaragoza
- Municipality: Villanueva de Gállego

Area
  - Total: 76 km^{2} (29 sq mi)

Population (2025-01-01)
  - Total: 4,852
  - Density: 64/km^{2} (170/sq mi)
- Time zone: UTC+1 (CET)
  - Summer (DST): UTC+2 (CEST)

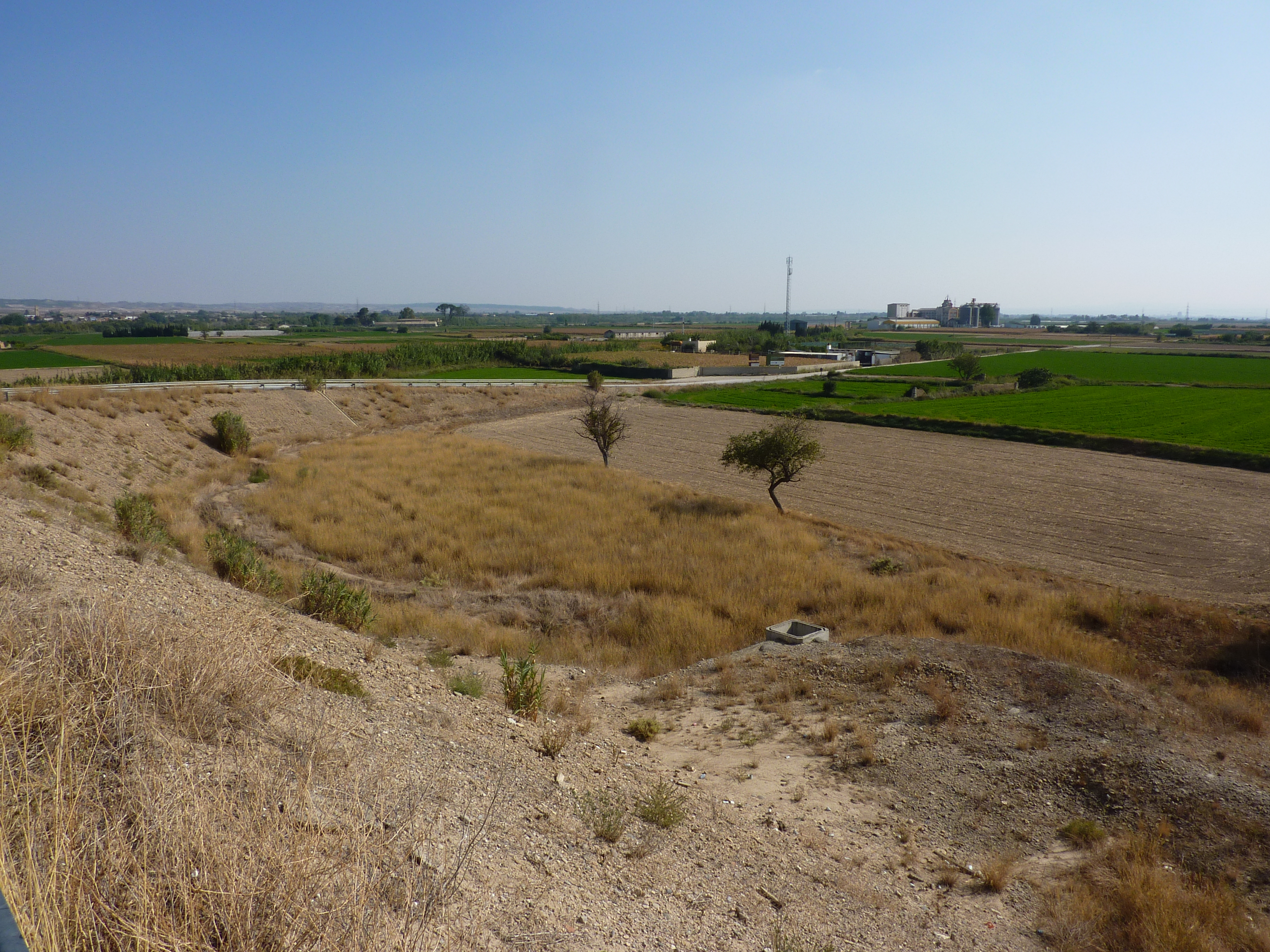
Villanueva de Gállego

Villanueva de Gállego is a municipality located in the province of Zaragoza, Aragon, Spain. According to the 2004 census (INE), the municipality has a population of 3,662 inhabitants.

A traditional dish is the Morloncho, based on blood sausage, sausage and chorizo.

A large multinational was recently installed; the area is known as the Spanish Silicon Valley.

== See also ==
- List of municipalities in Zaragoza
