= Retascón =

Coordinates: 41°09′N 1°23′W

Retascón, Spain
- Flag Coat of arms
- Interactive map of Retascón, Spain
- Country: Spain
- Autonomous community: Aragon
- Province: Zaragoza
- Municipality: Retascón

Area
  - Total: 25 km^{2} (9.7 sq mi)

Population (2025-01-01)
  - Total: 77
  - Density: 3.1/km^{2} (8.0/sq mi)
- Time zone: UTC+1 (CET)
  - Summer (DST): UTC+2 (CEST)

Retascón is a municipality located in the province of Zaragoza, Aragon, Spain. According to the 2011 census (INE), the municipality has a population of 69 inhabitants.

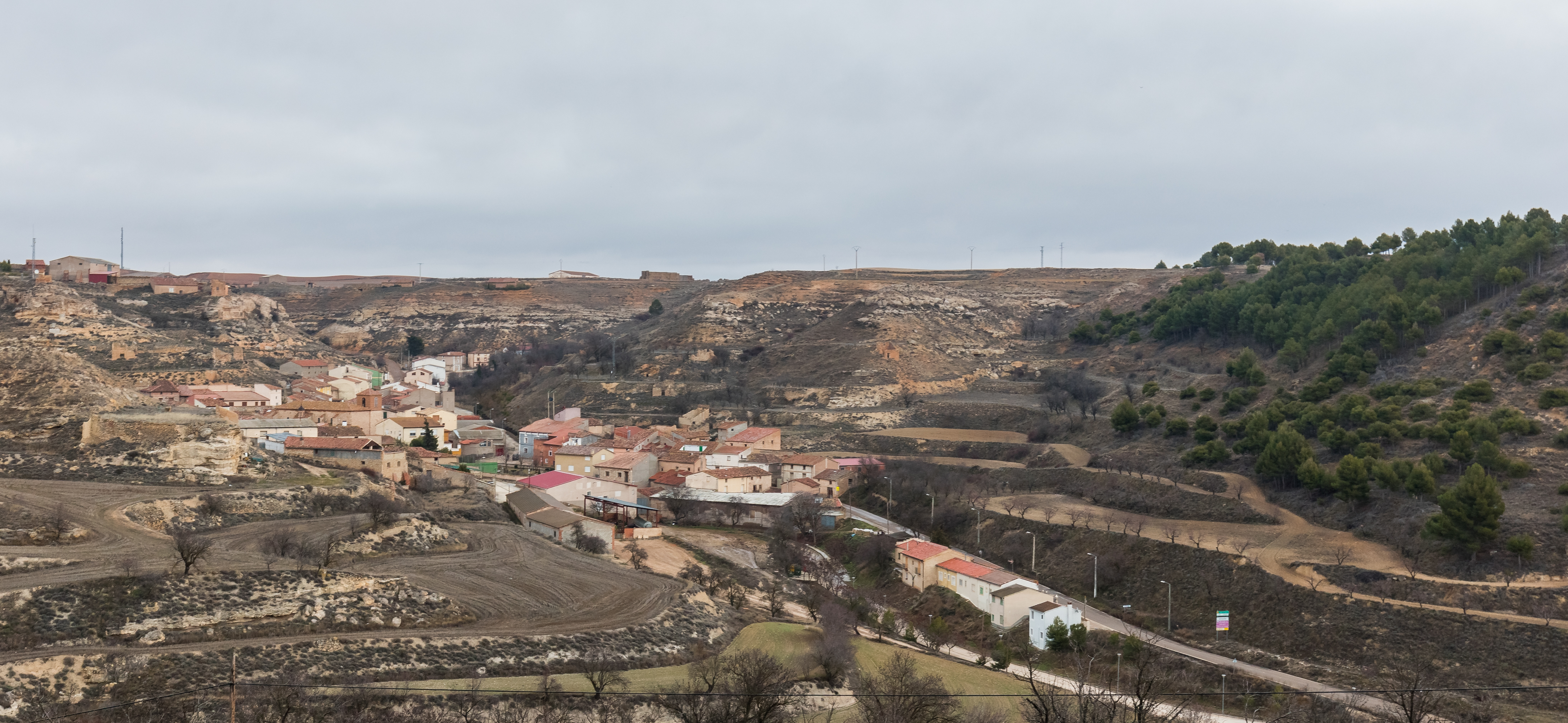
View of Retascón, Zaragoza, Spain

== See also ==
- List of municipalities in Zaragoza
