= A23 road (Northern Ireland) =

Road in Northern Ireland

Coordinates: 54.557797°N 5.8513°W

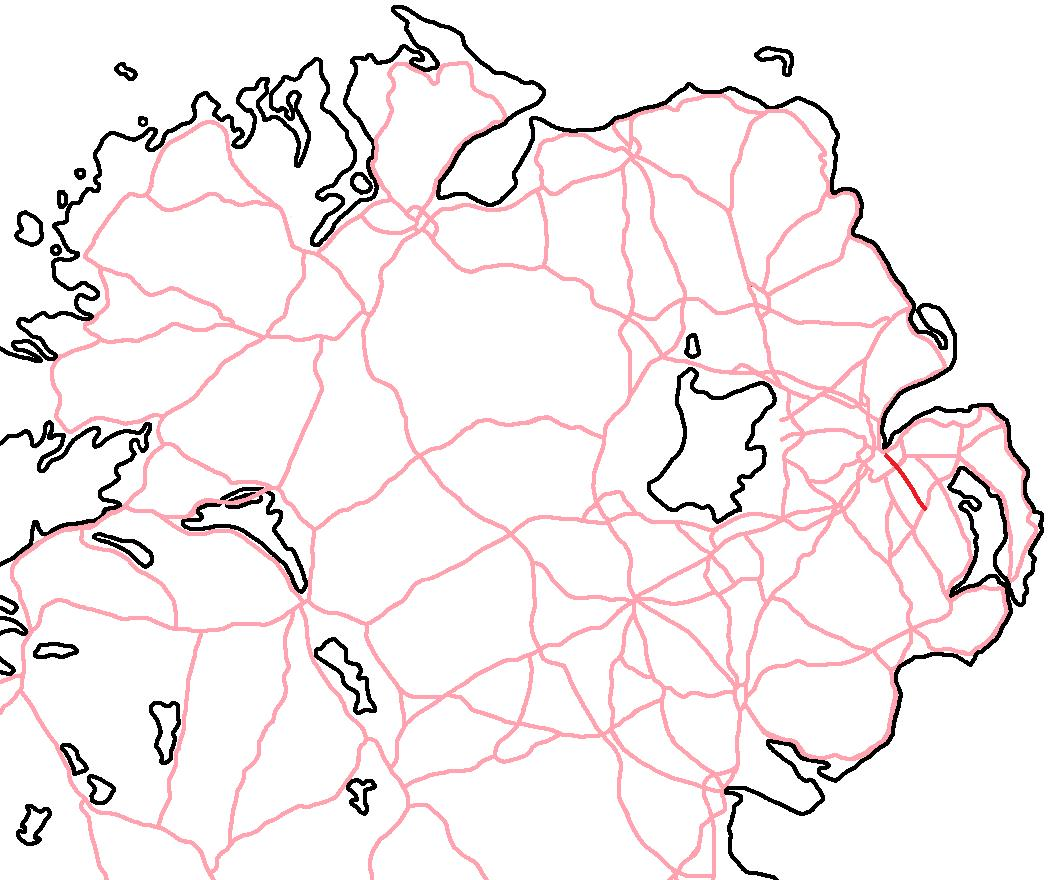
The route of the A23 in red from Belfast city centre (Co. Down) to Ballygowan (Co. Down).

The A23 is an 8.7-mile-long (14.0 km) road in County Down, in Northern Ireland. The route starts in near the Short Strand district in east Belfast and follows the Castlereagh Road through the southeastern suburbs of the city. Upon passing through the A55 Outer Ring Road, the A23 becomes the Ballygowan Road. It passes through the Castlereagh Hills and finishes in the village of Ballygowan at a roundabout with the A21.
