= Albelda de Iregua =

- Municipality
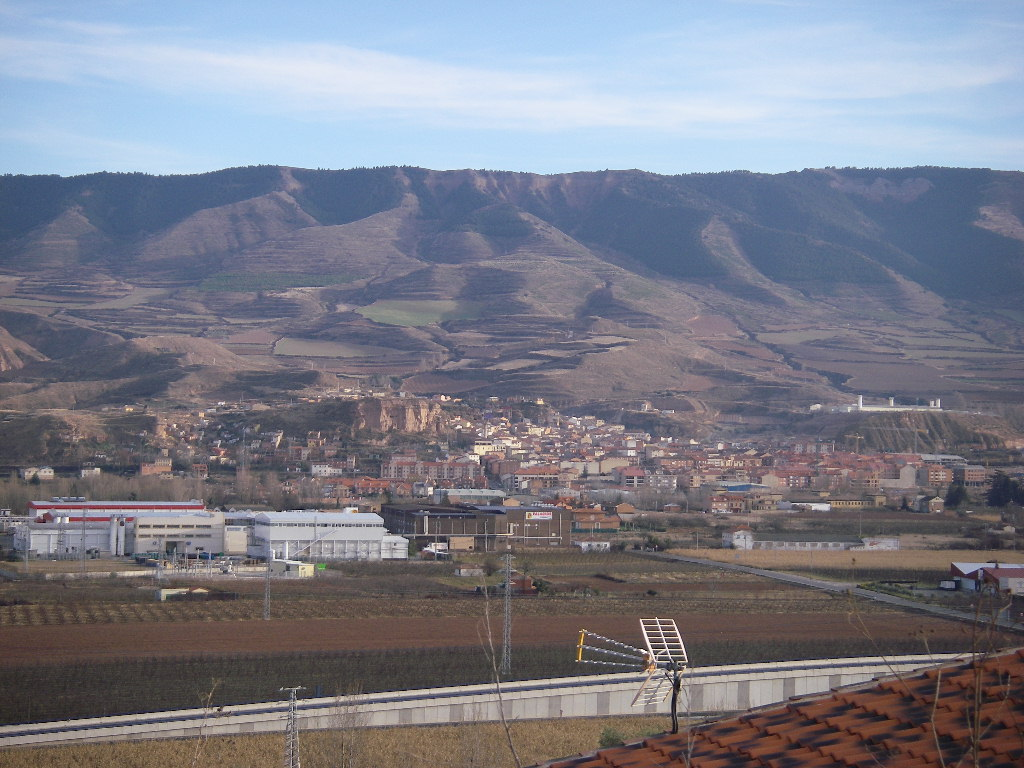
- View of Albelda de Iregua (La Rioja, Spain)

- Coat of arms

- Location of Albelda de Iregua in La Rioja Location of Albelda de Iregua in Spain
- Coordinates: 42°22′N 2°28′W
- Country: Spain
- Autonomous Community: La Rioja
- Province: La Rioja
- Comarca: Logroño

Government
  - Mayor: Rosa Ana Zorzano Cámara (PP)

Area
  - Total: 23.03 km^{2} (8.89 sq mi)

Population (2025-01-01)
  - Total: 3,930
- (INE)
- Postal code: 26120
- Website: www.albelda.org

Albelda de Iregua is a village and municipality in the province and autonomous community of La Rioja, Spain. The municipality covers an area of 23.03 square kilometres (8.89 sq mi) and as of 2011 had a population of 3339 people.

== Geography ==
The township of Albelda de Iregua

Albelda is located south of Logroño in the lower Iregua valley. This provides a fertile land for growing fruit.

The village is bounded on the north by Lardero and Alberite, to the east by Clavijo, to the south by Nalda and to the west by Sorzano and Entrena.

Within its terrains were the unpopulated communities of Longares, depopulated in the 12th century, Morcuera, deserted in the 14th century and Mucrones.

== History ==
In 1063 the Bishop of Nájera approved a Town Charter for the population, under the name Longares.

The town had a Jewish community since the 10th century till the Spanish Jewish Inquisition in 1492. During that period of time, about 35 families lived in the town, paying taxes to the local bishop. Several Jews acquired the surname of the town, such as Moses Albelda (died 1545), a bible commentator who lived in Turkey and assumed to have ancestors from the town, who escaped to Turkey during the Inquisition.

== Toponym ==
Its name may come from the Arabic term with the article Bayda Al, which means 'The White'. On the other hand, the etymology of the word "Albelda" proposed by the historian Urbano Espinosa points to the toponym Albalda/Albeilda (in Spanish), meaning "the village", as recorded in the Christian chronicles and consolidated during the Muslim rule (8th and 9th centuries). Its meaning has to do with the set of three monasteries located in the townships of Nalda and Albelda: San Pantaleon (in Nalda), and the monasteries of Albelda and Las Tapias, in Albelda itself.

== Population ==
As at 1 January 2010 the population of Albelda de Iregua was 3,291 persons, 1727 men and 1564 women.

demographic vertical bar chart of between 1857 and 2010
Legal population (1857-1897) according to the population census published by the Instituto Nacional de Estadística in the 19th century.
Legal population (1900-1991) or Resident population (2001) according to the population census published by the Instituto Nacional de Estadística.
Population according to the municipal register of 2010 published by the Instituto Nacional de Estadística.

== Places of interest ==
=== Buildings and monuments ===
- San Martín Church, constructed in 1970
- Santa Isabel Hermitage
- Nuestra Señora de Bueyo Hermitage, Romanesque. It was declared Bien de Interés Cultural (property of Cultural Interest) in the category of monuments on 13 June 1983.
- Santa Fe de Palazuelos Hermitage. It was declared Bien de Interés Cultural (property of Cultural Interest) in the category of monuments on 25 October 1984.

== Photo gallery ==
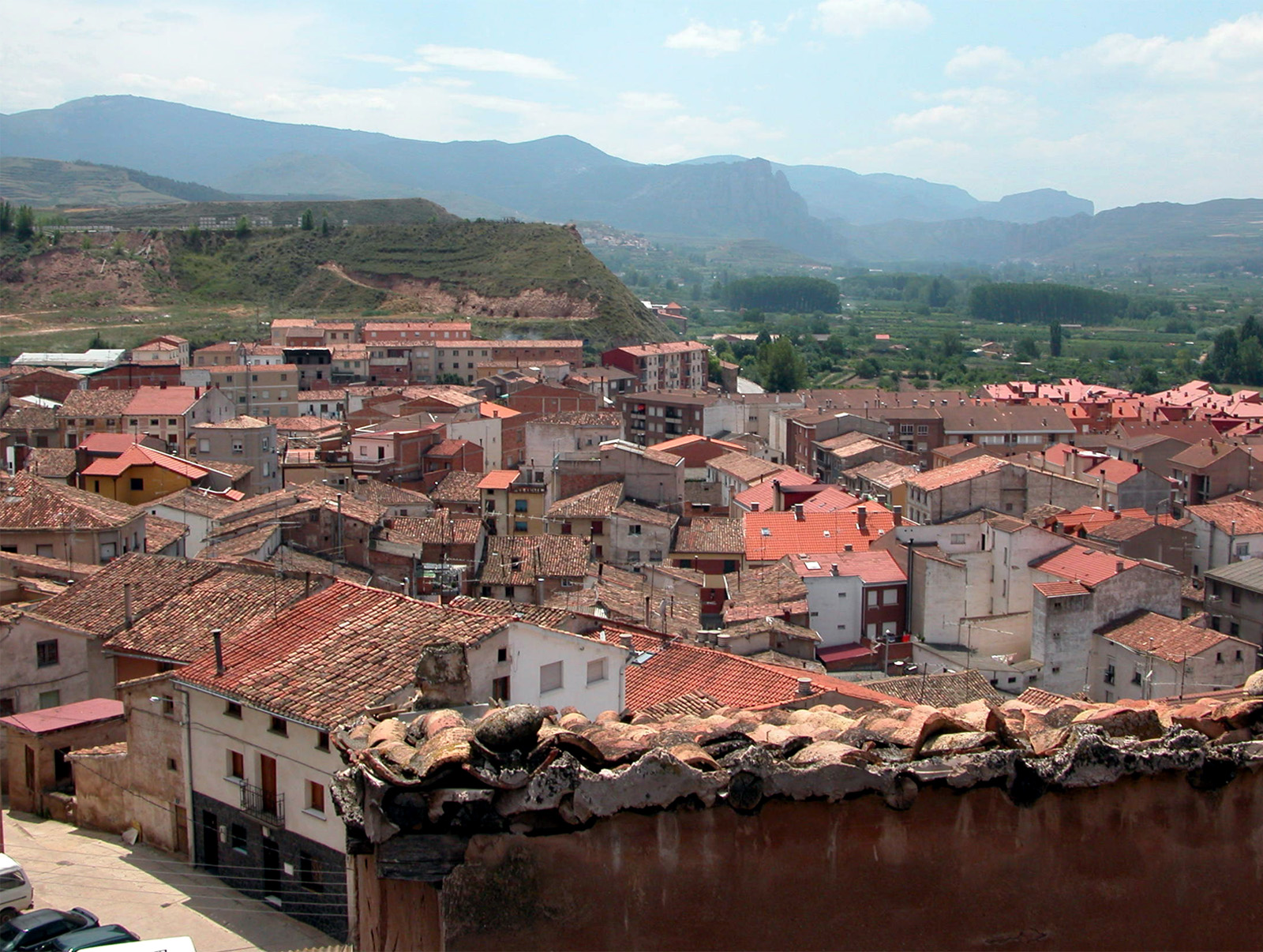
General view of the area

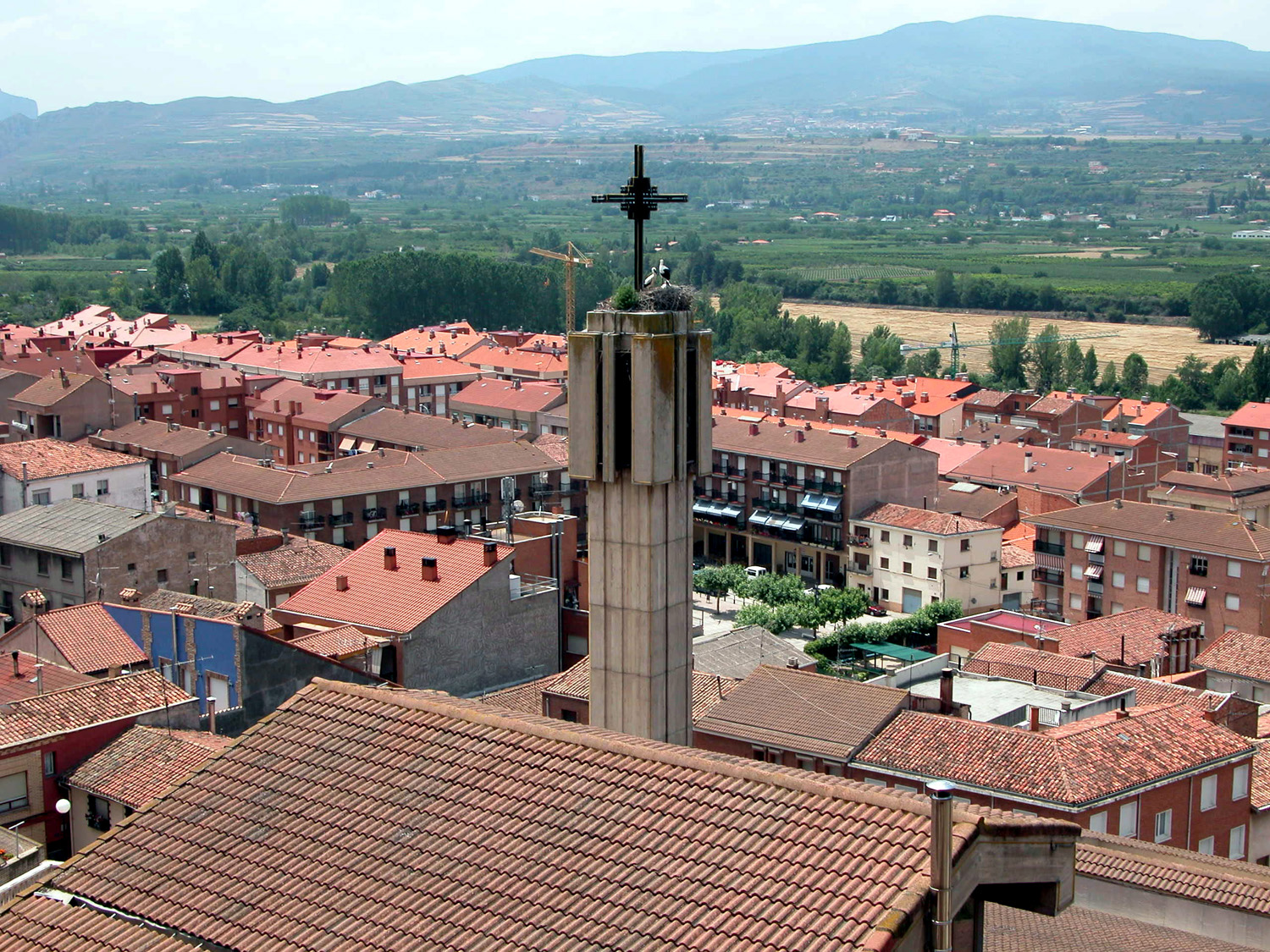
Parish church tower

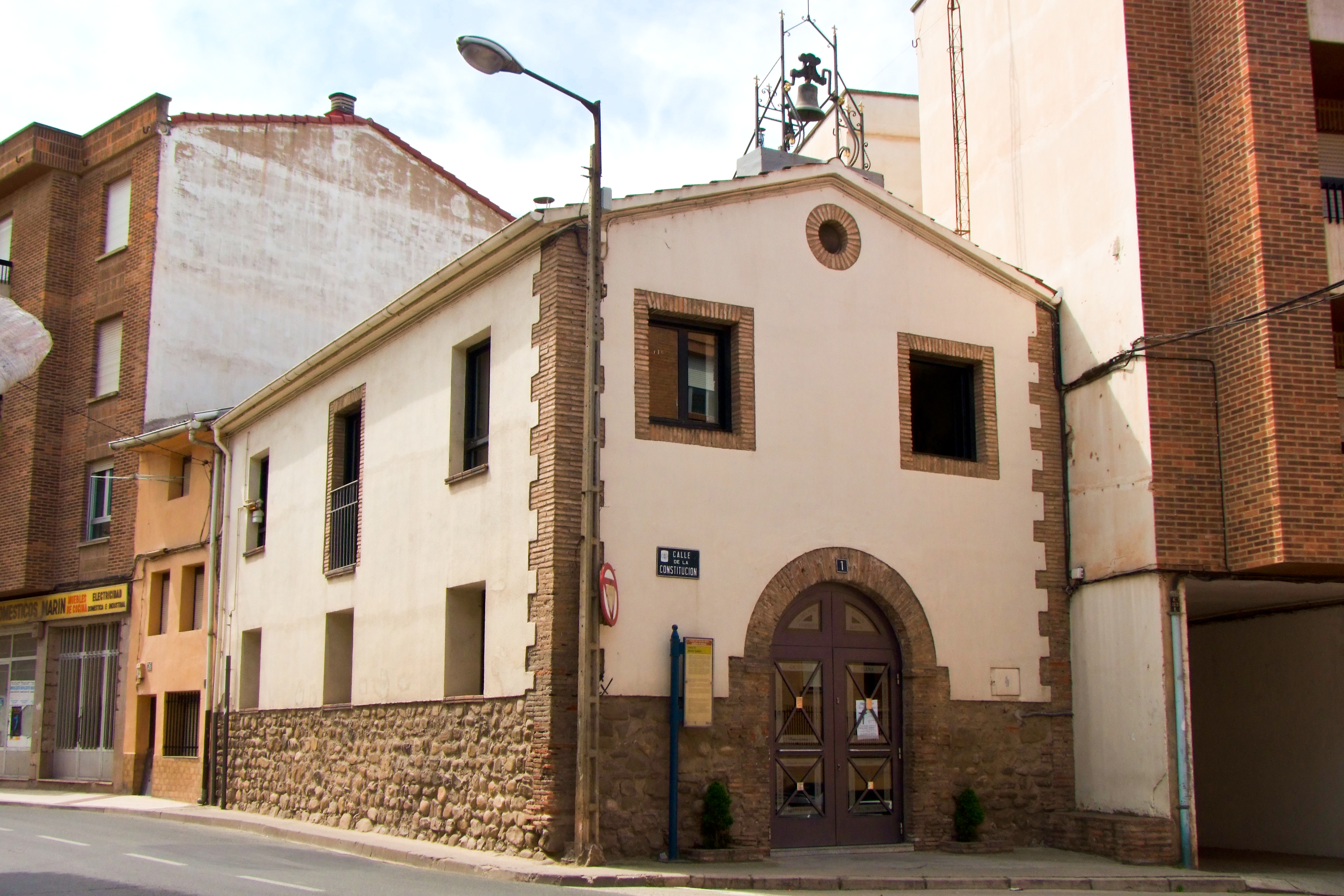
Santa Isabel Hermitage

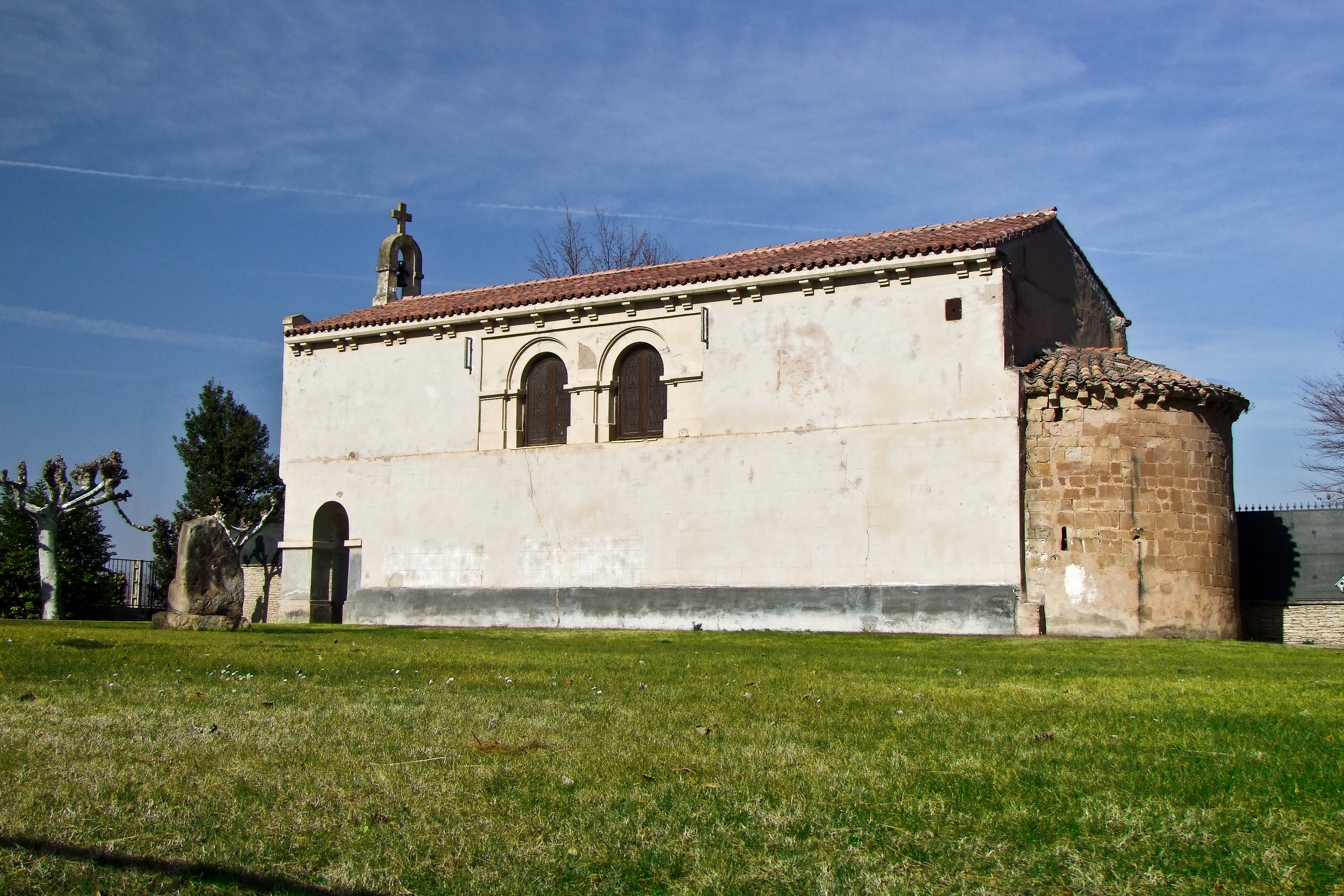
Nuestra Señora de Bueyo Hermitage

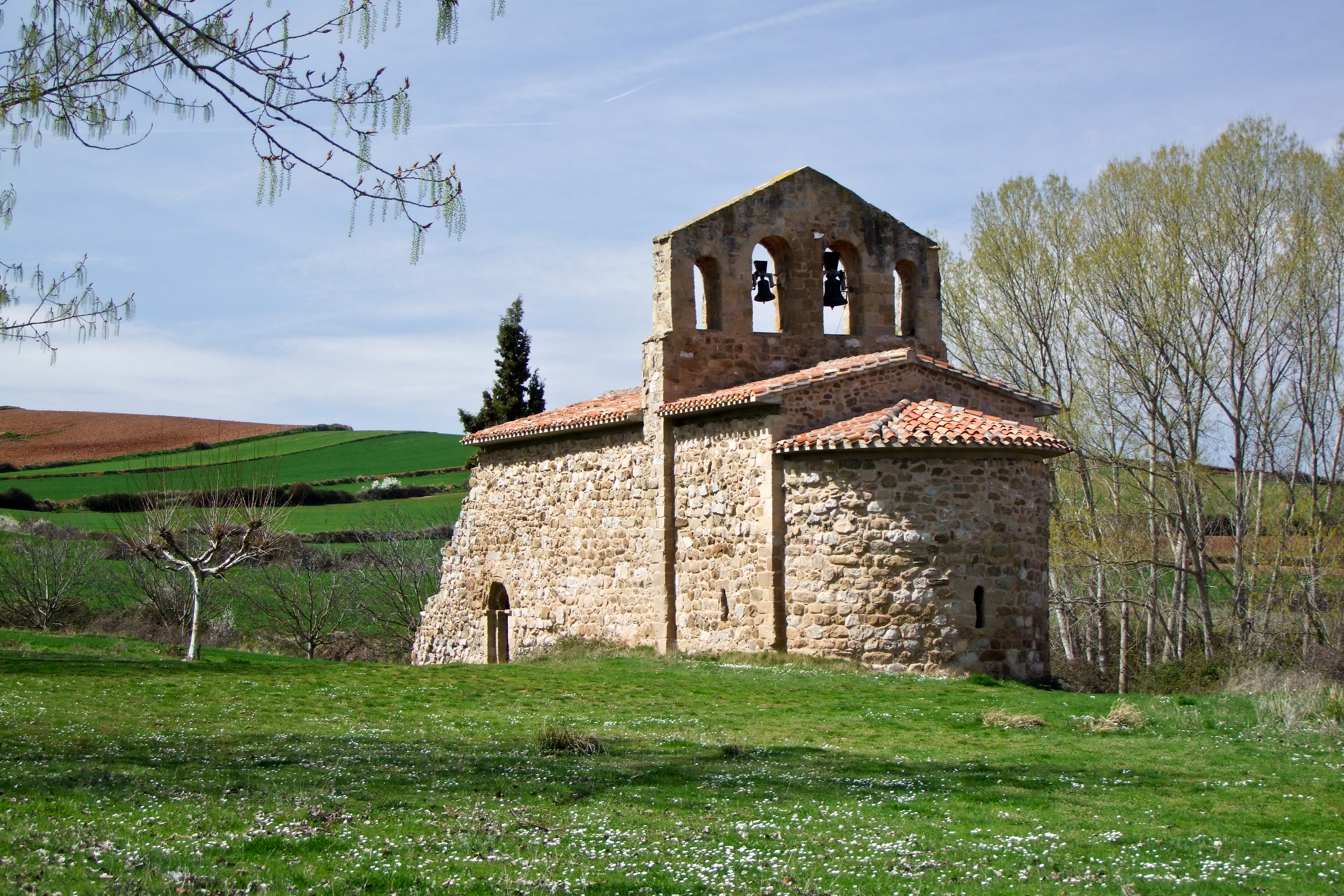
Santa Fe de Palazuelos Hermitage

== Local celebrations ==
- Pilgrimage to San Marcos: 25 April
- Saint Prudencio Feast day: 28 April
- Feasts of Triumph (or Summer): last Sunday in August
- Isidore the Laborer: 15 May
- Saint James: 25 July
- Virgen de Bueyo: 25 March

== Notable people ==
- Javier Cámara, actor
- Salva Díez, basketball player
- Carlos Coloma Nicolás, cyclist

== See also ==
- San Martín de Albelda monastery
- Battle of Albelda (851)
