= Camero Nuevo =

- Comarca
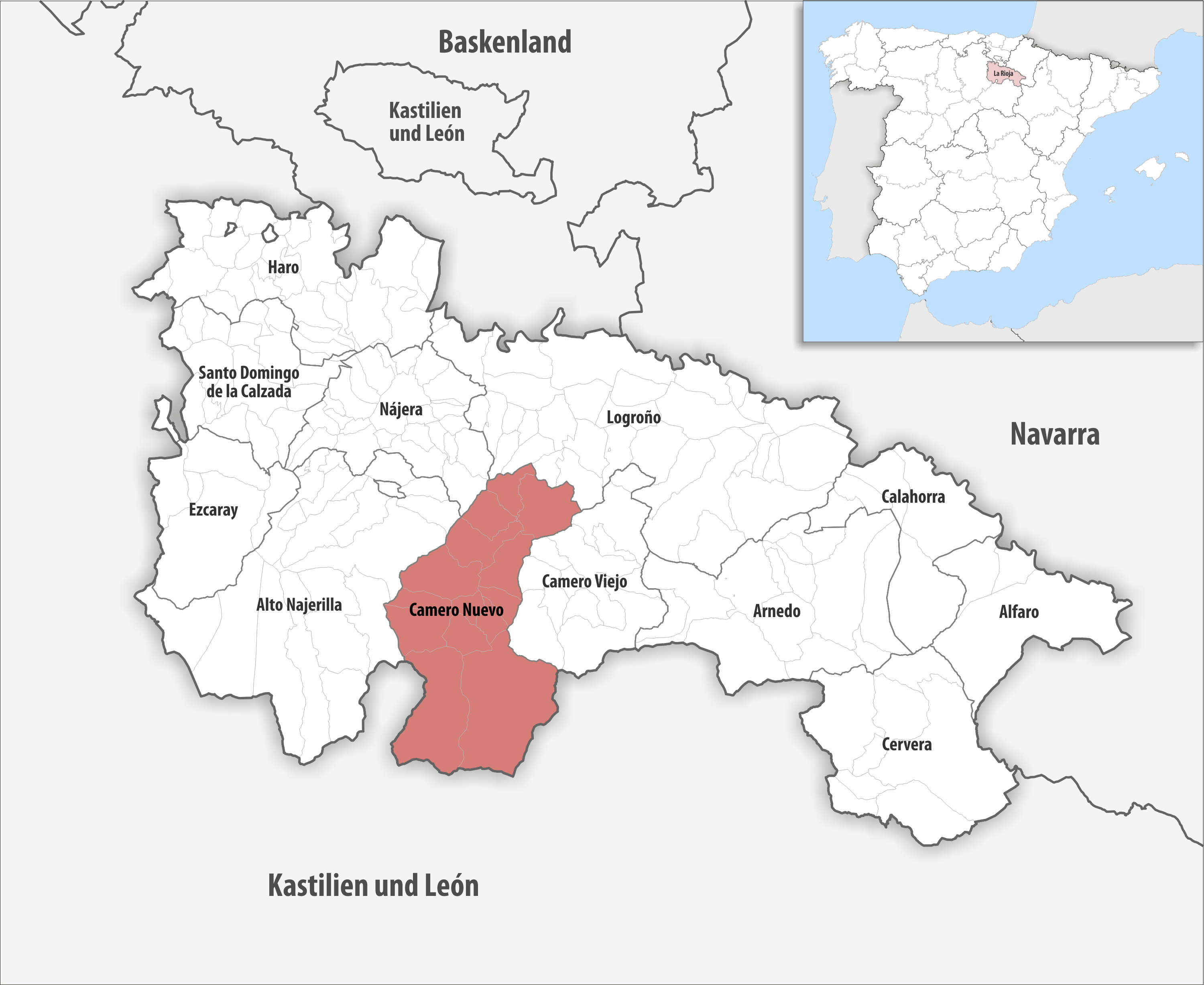
- Camero Nuevo
- Interactive map of Camero Nuevo
- Coordinates: 42.190159°N 2.643274°W
- Country: Spain

Camero Nuevo is a comarca in La Rioja province in Spain.
