= Arabic exonyms =

This list of Arabic exonyms includes names that are significantly different from the names of the same places in other languages, as well as names of Arabic origin in countries (especially Spain) where Arabic is no longer spoken. Some of these exonyms are no longer in use; these are marked by italics.

Places not mentioned are generally referred to in Arabic by their respective names in their native languages, adapted to Arabic phonology as necessary.

== Austria ==
Austria
English name	Arabic name	Endonym		Notes
English name	Arabic name	Name	Language	Notes
Austria	an-Namsā (النمسا)			Comes from the Ottoman Turkish نمچه (nemçe, “Austrian”), which comes from the Proto-Slavic word němьcь, which means foreigner/non-Slav/German.

== China ==
China
English name	Arabic name	Endonym		Notes
English name	Arabic name	Name	Language	Notes
Beijing	Khān Bālq (خان بالق) or Bekīn (بكين) or Beijīn/Beijīnq/Beijīngh (بيجين/بيجينق/بيجينغ)			Khān Bālq is the old medieval Arabic exonym for Beijing, it was named as such after the winter capital of the Mongolian Yuan dynasty, Khanbaliq, which is the direct predecessor to modern Beijing. Bekīn arouse from the French exonym Pékin, which itself came from the Portuguese exonym Pequim. The exonyms Beijīn, Beijīnq, and Beijīngh are the modern Arabic exonyms for Beijing, they come from the Mandarin name of the city and are often used interchangeably.
China	aṣ-Ṣīn (الصين) or Māṣīn (ماصين)			aṣ-Ṣīn is derived from Middle Persian 𐭰𐭩𐭭 (čīn, “China”), from Sanskrit चीन (cīna, “China”), itself usually derived from Old Chinese 秦 (*zin, “Qin”). Māṣīn is derived from the Persian Machin (ماچين), itself derived from the Sanskrit Maha Chin meaning Great China. This exonym was rarely used.
Guangzhou	Ṣīn Kalan (صين كَلان) or Ṣīn aṣ-Ṣīn (صين الصين) or Ṣīniyat aṣ-Ṣīn (صينية الصين)			Ṣīn Kalan, Ṣīn aṣ-Ṣīn, and Ṣīniyat aṣ-Ṣīn are all derived from the Persian Machin (ماچين), itself derived from the Sanskrit Maha Chin meaning Great China. Kalan (كَلان) is also of Persian origin and translates to 'Large' or 'Great'.
Hangzhou	al-Khansā' (الخنساء)			al-Khansā' is the medieval Arabic exonym for the city of Hangzhou, it was named as such after the companion of Muhammad and famous female poet, Tumāḍir al-Khansā'. al-Khansā' translates to "snub-nosed", an Arabic epithet for a gazelle as metaphor for beauty.
Quanzhou	Madinat az-Zaytūn (مدينة الزيتون)			Madinat az-Zaytūn translates to 'City of the Olives' and is a calque of Quanzhou's former Chinese nickname Citong Cheng meaning "tung-tree city", which is derived from the avenues of oil-bearing tung trees ordered to be planted around the city by the city's 10th-century ruler Liu Congxiao.

== Cyprus ==
Cyprus
English name	Arabic name	Endonym		Notes
English name	Arabic name	Name	Language	Notes
Nicosia	al-'Afqūsiyah (الأَفْقُوسِيَة) or Niqūsiah (نيقوسيا)			al-'Afqūsiyah (الأفقوسية) was the old Arabic name for Nicosia, and it originates from the Byzantine Greek name of the city, Λευκωσία (Lefkosia). Niqūsiah (نيقوسيا) is the Modern Arabic name for the city.

== France ==
France
English name	Arabic name	Endonym		Notes
English name	Arabic name	Name	Language	Notes
Bay of Biscay	Bāhr al-Akhdar			

== Georgia ==
Georgia
English name	Arabic name	Endonym		Notes
English name	Arabic name	Name	Language	Notes
Georgia	al-Kurj (الكُرج) or Bilād al-Kurj (بلاد الكُرج) or Kurjistan (كُرْجِسْتَان) or Jorjyah (جورجيا)			al-Kurj or Bilād al-Kurj (The Lands of Georgia) was the Arabic exonym for Georgia during medieval times, it most likely came from the Persian exonym for Georgia, Gorj (گرج), the name is still in use today although rarely. Kurjistan was most likely borrowed from the Turkish exonym Gorjestân, which is of Persian origin, it most likely gained popularity during Ottoman rule. Jorjyah is currently the most widely used exonym, which comes from the European name for Georgia.
Tbilisi	Tiflīs (تفليس)			Comes from the Persian pronunciation of the name, Tiflis.

== Germany ==
Germany
English name	Arabic name	Endonym		Notes
English name	Arabic name	Name	Language	Notes
Germany	'Almānya (أَلمَانِيَا)			Comes from the French name for Germany, Allemagne, but was known in medieval times as Jirmānyah (جرمانية), which was the Arabized form of its Latin name, Germania.

== Gibraltar ==
Gibraltar
English name	Arabic name	Endonym		Notes
English name	Arabic name	Name	Language	Notes
Gibraltar	Jabal Ṭāriq (جبل طارق)			Founded with an Arabic name meaning 'Mountain of Ṭariq', named for the 8th-century Islamic military leader Ṭariq ibn Ziyad.

== Greece ==
Greece
English name	Arabic name	Endonym		Notes
English name	Arabic name	Name	Language	Notes
Greece	al-Yūnān (اليُونَان)			Comes from Old Persian 𐎹𐎢𐎴 (Yauna, “Ionia”), which references the Greek region of Ionia, that resides in modern-day Turkey.
Heraklion	Rabḍ al-Khandaq (ربض الخندق)			Given an Arabic name after its conquest, this name was then Hellenized as Χάνδαξ (Chándax) or Χάνδακας (Chándakas), and would remain until the 19th century when the city revived its ancient name Ηράκλειον (Heracleion).
Chania	al-Hānim (الهانم) or Khānia (خانيا)			al-Hānim (الهانم) is the Arabic name given to Chania after its conquest; this name was then Hellenized as Χανιά (Chania), and it is from which the modern Arabic exonym Khānia (خانيا) originates.

== Italy ==
Italy
English name	Arabic name	Endonym		Notes
English name	Arabic name	Name	Language	Notes
Acireale	al-Yāj (الْياج) or Liyāj (لِياج)			
Agira	Shant Fīlibb (شنت فيلب)			Arabized form of its old name San Filippo.
Alcamo	Manzil al-Qāmūq (منزل القاموق) or 'Alqāmāh (علقمة)			Manzil al-Qāmūq (House of al-Qāmūq) is the name Muhammad al-Idrisi wrote to be the original Arabic name of Alcamo, however the Arabs at the time referred to it as 'Alqāmāh. al-Qāmūq is the founder of Alcamo.
Alcara li Fusi	Al-Aqarāt			Founded with Arabic name
Alì	Ali (عَلِيّ)			One of the possible theories for the etymology of this town is the Arabic name Ali (عَلِيّ).
Alimena	Al-Imān			Founded with Arabic name
Aliminusa	Rakhbal Al-Mīnusa			Founded with Arabic name
Amalfi	Malf (ملف)			
Ancona	'Ankūnah (أَنْكُونَة) or 'Anqūnah (أَنْقُونَة)			
Apulia	Būlyah (بولية)			
Aquileia	Iklāyah (إيكلاية) or 'Anklāyah (أنكلاية)			
Bagheria	Bab al-Gharb (باب الغرب) or Baḥrīyah (بحرية)			Founded with Arabic name; either from Bab al-Garb (باب الغرب), 'Gate of the West', or from Baḥrīyah (بحرية), which means 'Sea' or 'Marine'.
Benevento	Binfint (بنفنت) or Binbint (بنبنت)			
Borghetto	Al-Burjātah			Founded with Arabic name
Brindisi	'Abrinṭas (ابرنطس) or 'Abrindas (ابرندس)			
Buscemi	Qalʿat ʾAbū Shāma (قلعة أبو شامة) or Qalʿat ʾAbī Shāma (قلعة أبي شامة)			Founded with Arabic name: 'The Fortress of the Man with the Mole'. Over the centuries the name has been Romanized as Abu Xamah, Abuxama, or even Abisama. The Latinized version Buxemae and Bussemae, from the Norman period, however, is the one closest to today's form.
Cagliari	Qālmarah (قالمرة)			
Calabria	Qalawriyah (قَلَوْرِيَة)			
Calamonaci	Qalamūnash or Qal'at Mūn (قلعة مون) or Qal'at Mūnah (قلعة مونة)			Calamonaci has two possible etymologies: either from Qalamūnash, which itself is a derivation from the Greek Kalamiōn, or from Qal'at Mūn/Mūnah 'Fortress of Mūn/Mūnah'.
Calatafimi-Segesta	Qal'at Fīmī (قلعة فيمي)			Founded with Arabic name: 'Fortress of Fīmī'.
Caltabellotta	Qal'at al-Balūṭ (قلعة البلوط)			Founded with Arabic name: 'Fortress of The Oak'.
Caltagirone	Qal'at Ghīrān (قلعة غيران) or Qa'lat al-Jinūn (قلعة الجنون)			Founded with Arabic name. Was called Qal'at al-Jinūn (قلعة الجنون) during the Aghlabid period; also known as Ḥiṣn al-Jinūn ( حصن الجنون) or Ḥiṣn al-Jinawiyīn (حصن الجنويين), 'Fortress of the Genoese'. The name eventually became Qal'at Ghīrān (قلعة غيران), meaning 'Fortress of Ghīran'.
Caltanissetta	Qal'at an-Nisa' (قَلْعَةُ النِّسَاءِ)			Its original name was Castra Nicia; this name was then arabized into Qal'at an-Nisa' (قَلْعَةُ النِّسَاءِ) meaning 'Fortess of the Women'.
Caltavuturo	Qal'at Abī Thawr (قلعة أبي ثور)			Founded with Arabic name: 'Fortress of Abī Thawr'.
Camerino	Qamrīn (قَمْرِين)			
Canicattì	Khandaq aṭ-Ṭīn (خندق الطين)			Founded with Arabic name: 'Trench of Mud'.
Capri	Qabrah (قَبْرَةُ)			
Cassaro	al-Qaṣr (القصر)			Founded with Arabic name: 'the Castle'.
Castello di Mongialino	Malja' Khalil (ملجأ خليل) or Manzil Malja' Khalil (منزل ملجأ خليل)			'Khalil's Shelter'.
Catania	Qaṭāniyyah (قَطَانِيَةُ) or Qaṭāliyyah (قَطَالِيَةُ)			The city was also known as Balad al-Fīl (بَلَد الفِيل) or Madinat al-Fīl (مَدِينَة الفِيل), meaning 'Land/City of the Elephant'.
Catanzaro	Qaṭanṣār (قطنصار)			
Cefalà Diana	Jaflah (جفلة)			
Città di Castello	Qaṣṭlu (قصطلو)			
Civitavecchia	Jabt Bakkah (جبت بكّة)			
Collesano	Qal'at aṣ-Ṣarāṭ (قلعة الصراط)			'Fortress of Ṣarāṭ'
Comacchio	Qamālqah (قمالقة)			
Corleone	Qurliyūn (قُرلِيُون) or Qurullūn (قُرُلُون) or Qurulliyūn (قُرُلِيُون)			The etymology of the name is uncertain. It is believed to have taken its name from an Arab soldier who fought for the Aghlabids.
Cosenza	Kashnatah (كشنتة)			
Crotone	Qaṭrūnah (قطرونة)			
Enna	Qaṣr Yānih (قَصْرُ يَانِه) or Qaṣr Yāni (قصر ياني)			'Castle of Yānih/Yāni'; nativized as 'Castrogiovanni', which remained in use until 1926.
Florence	Flūransah (فَلُورَنْسَة) or 'Iflūransah (إِفْلُورَنْسَة)			
Gela	Madinat al-'Amidah (مدينة الأعمدة)			'City of the Pillars'
Italy	Īṭaliya (إيطاليا) or al-'Arḍ al-Kabīrah (الأَرْض الكبيرة)			al-'Arḍ al-Kabīrah translates to 'The Big Land', and it is a term used by medieval Arabs for the entire Italian Peninsula, but oftentimes it was used only for the region of Southern Italy.
Kalsa	al-Khāliṣa (الخالصة)			Founded with Arabic name: 'the Pure one'.
Lascari	Madinah Al-Asqāri			Founded with Arabic name
Lecce	Lajj (لَجّ)			
Livorno	Qurnah (قُرْنَة)			It was named as such after the Livorno Jews, who are known as al-Qirānah (القرانة) in Arabic and Grana in Judeo-Arabic.
Lombardy	'Anbardiah (أَنْبَرْدِيَة) or 'Anbarḍiah (أَنْبَرْضِيَة) or 'Ankabardiah (أنكبردية) or Bilād al-Linbard (بلاد اللنبرد)			Bilād al-Linbard translates to 'Land of the Lombards'.
Marineo	Mirnaw (مرناو)			
Marsala	Marsā 'Ali (مَرْسَى عَلِيّ) or Marsā Allāh (مَرْسَى الله)			Renamed with Arabic name after conquest: 'Ali's Harbour' or 'Allāh's Harbour'.
Mazaro	Wadī al-Majnūn (وادي المجنون)			'Mad Valley' or 'Valley of the Madman'.
Messina	Musaynah (مسّينى) or Masīnah (مَسِّينَةُ)			
Mineo	Mīnaw (مِيناو) or Qal'at Mīnaw (قلعة مِيناو)			
Misilmeri	Manzil al-'Amīr (منزل الأمير)			'Home of the Emir'.
Monte Catalfaro	Qal'at al-Far (قلعة الفار)			'Fortress of the Mouse'
Mount Etna	Jabal al-Nār (جبل النار)			'Mountain of Fire'.
Naples	Nabul (نَابُل)			
Otranto	'Aḏrant (أذرنت)			
Padua	Bāḏuah (بَاذُوَة)			
Palermo	Balarm (بَلَرْم)			
Pantelleria	Qawṣarah (قَوْصَرَة)			
Pesaro	Bisrah (بيسرة) or Biṣrah (بيصرة)			
Pisa	Bīzā (بيزا) or Bīsh (بيش) or Bīshah (بيشة)			Bīsh and Bīshah are medieval terms used by al-Idrisi to name the city, but in modern times Piza is referred to as Bīzā.
Ponza	Bānūsah (بَانُوسَةُ)			
Ravenna	Rabnah (ربنة)			
Regalbuto	Rākhbāl Al-Abbūd			Founded with Arabic name
Reggio Calabria	Rīyyah (رية) or Rayyū (رَيُو)			
Rimini	'Arīmnī (اريمني) or 'Arīmnīs (اريمنيس)			
Rome	Rūma (روما) or Rūmiyah (رُومِيَّة)			Rūmiya (رُومِيَّة) was the early Arabic name for Rome, and is rarely used nowadays.
Rossano	Rusyānah (رسيانة)			
Salerno	Slirno (سلرنو)			
Sardinia	Sardānyah (سَرْدَانِيَة) or Suridānyah (سُرِدَانِيَة)			
Savoca	Qalāt Az-Zabūd			
Sciacca	ash-Shāqah (الشاقة)			'The one who Separates'
Sicily	Ṣiqilliya (صِقِلِّيَة)			
Simeto	Wadī Mūsa (وادي موسى)			'Valley of Mūsa'.
Siponto	Sībent (سيبنت)			
Sorrento	Srint (سرنت)			
Soverato	Sibirniah (سبرنية)			
Siracusa	Saraqūsah (سَرَقُوسَة)			
Squillace	'Asjilāsah (اسجلاسة)			
Taormina	Ṭābarmīn (طَبَرْمِين)			Under the Fatimids, it was called al-Muīzziyyah (المعزّية) or Madinat al-Muīzz (مدينة المعزّ) after Caliph al-Muīzz.
Taranto	Ṭārant (طارنت)			
Terracina	Ṭarjīnah (طرجينة)			
Tivoli	Tūḏur (تَوْذُر)			
Trani	Ṭrānah (طرانة) or 'Aṭrānah (اطرانة)			
Trapani	'Aṭrābansh (أَطْرَابَنِش) or Ṭarābanash (طَرَابَنَش)			
Trieste	Iṣṭājānku (إصطاجانكو) or Isṭājānku (إسطاجانكو)			
Tropea	Atrabiyah (اتربية)			
Turin	Ṭarūnah (طَرُونَة)			
Tuscany	Tuskanah (تُسكانة) or Ṭusqanah (طُسقانة)			
Tyrrhenian Sea	Baḥr Ṭrānah (بحر طرانة)			
Venice	al-Bunduqīyya (اَلْبُنْدُقِيَّةُ)			The etymology of al-Bunduqīyya is uncertain but probably derives from modification of Byzantine Greek Βενετικός and/or Venetian venedego under influence from Arabic bunduq (بُنْدُق, "hazelnut, pebble, bullet") + -iyya (ـِيَّة, "-ia"), ultimately derived from the ancient Greek Pontus, which abounded in hazels. The name is attested from the early 10th century.
Vieste	Bistiyah (بستية)			
Villanova	Ballanūbah (بلنوبا) Bor illa Nūba (بيلّا نووِبا)			It was the home of the Siculo-Arabic poet known as al-Balnūbi, it was destroyed or deserted before the Norman conquest.
Zisa	Qaṣr al-Azīz (قصر العزيز)			The name Zisa derives from the Arab term al-Azīz, meaning "dear" or "splendid". The structure was conceived as a summer residence for the Norman kings, as a part of the large hunting resort known as Genoardo (Arabic: Jannat al-arḍ [جنة الأرض], literally "Earthly Paradise").

== Indonesia ==
Indonesia
English name	Arabic name	Endonym		Notes
English name	Arabic name	Name	Language	Notes
Indonesian Archipelago	Jazirah al-Jawi (جزيرة الجاوي)			Comes from Sanskrit exonym (Yavadvipa; Java Island), but in medieval times it generally refers to the Malay Archipelago or the Maritime Southeast Asia, as medieval Arab geographers often referred the whole region after a common place name (Pars pro toto).

== Malta ==
Malta
English name	Arabic name	Endonym		Notes
English name	Arabic name	Name	Language	Notes
Mdina	Madinat Mālṭah (مدينة مَالِطَةَ)			'City of Malta'.

== Montenegro ==
Montenegro
English name	Arabic name	Endonym		Notes
English name	Arabic name	Name	Language	Notes
Montenegro	al-Jabal al-'Aswad (الجبل الأسود)			'The Black Mountain', like Montenegro a translation of the endonym Črna Gora

== Netherlands ==
Netherlands
English name	Arabic name	Endonym		Notes
English name	Arabic name	Name	Language	Notes
The Hague	Lāhāy (لاهاي) or Alahāyah (الَهَايَهْ)			Lāhāy is the Arabized form of its French name La Haye. It was known among the Arabs in old times as Alahāyah.

== Portugal ==
Portugal
English name	Arabic name	Endonym		Notes
English name	Arabic name	Name	Language	Notes
Albufeira	al-Buḥayrah (البُحَيْرَة)			Founded with Arabic name, 'The Lake'.
Alcácer do Sal	Qaṣr 'Abi Dānis (قصر أبي دانس)			Founded with Arabic name, 'The Castle of 'Abi Dānis
Alcoutim	al-Quṭāmi (القطامي)			Founded with Arabic name, 'The Falcon'.
Alfândega da Fé	al-Funduq (الفندق)			Founded with Arabic name, 'The Inn'.
Algarve	al-Gharb (الغرب)			Founded with Arabic name, 'The West'.
Aljezur	al-Juzur (الجزر)			Founded with Arabic name, 'The Islands'.
Almada	Ḥiṣn al-Mā'din (حصن المعدن)			Founded with Arabic name, 'The Metal Fortress'.
Almeirim	Madinah al-Māryām			Founded with Arabic name
Almodôvar	al-Mudawwar (المُدَوَّر)			Founded with Arabic name, 'The Round One'.
Beja	Bājah (باجة)			The town was known during the times of the Visigoths as Paca, this was then Arabized into Bājah (باجة) during Umayyad times, and eventually turned into its modern form Beja when the Christians took over.
Coimbra	Qulumriyah (قُلُمْرِيَة) or Qulunbariyah (قلنبرية)			Arabized form of its old Roman name Colimbria.
Faro	Shantamariat al-Gharb (شَنْتَمَرِيَّةُ الغرب)			'Santa Maria of the West'.
Fátima	Fāṭīmah (فاطمة)			Named after Fāṭīmah az-Zahra', the daughter of the Islamic prophet Muhammad.
Ossonoba	'Akshūnbah (أكشونبة)			Arabized form of its old Roman name Ossónoba.
Ourém	Abdegas			Abdegas was apparently the name of the Muslim village on which the city of Ourém was founded, the Arabic pronunciation of the word is unknown.
Sacavém	Shaqabān (شقبان)			
Silves	Shilb (شِلْب)			
Tavira	Ṭabīrah (طبيرة)			Founded with Arabic name

== Spain ==
Spain
English name	Arabic name	Endonym		Notes
English name	Arabic name	Name	Language	Notes
Acered	al-Sirāṭ (السراط)			Founded with Arabic name
Aguilar de la Frontera	Ḥiṣn Bulāy (حصن بُلَاي)			'The Fortress of Bulāy'
Albacete	al-Basīṭ (ﭐَلبَسِيط)			Founded with Arabic name, 'The Plain' or 'The Flat', referring to the flat plains around.
Albaicín	al-Bayyāzīn (ٱلْبَيّازِينْ)			Founded with Arabic name
Albaida	al-Bayḍā' (البيضاء)			Founded with Arabic name, 'The White'.
Albalá	al-Balāṭ (البلاط) or al-Ballā'a (البَلَّاعة)			Founded with Arabic name. al-Balāṭ 'The Tiles' or 'The Stones', in reference to the Roman road nearby al-Ballā'a 'The Gutter'.
Albarracín	Banī Rāzin (بَنِي رَزِينٍ) or Sahlat Banī Rāzin (سَهْلَةُ بَنِي رَزِينٍ) or Shantamariat ash-Sharq (شَنْتَمَرِيَّةُ الشَّرْقِ)			Named after the Hawwara Berber Banu Razin dynasty that ruled the Taifa of Albarracín in the early eleventh century, it was also known as 'Ibn Rāzin (ابن رزين) or as-Sahlah (السَّهْلَةُ) Before it was ruled by the Banu Razin, it was known Shantamariah (شَنْتَمَرِيَّةُ) or Shantamariat ash-Sharq (شَنْتَمَرِيَّةُ الشَّرْقِ), i.e. 'Santa Maria of the East'.
Alberite	al-Baldah (البلدة)			'The Town'. This is one of two theories for the etymology of the town, the other one being the Latin Alber-iter.
Alburquerque	Abu al-Qūrq or Baladiyat Abī al-Qūrq (بَلَدِيَّةُ أَبِي القُرْقِ)			Founded with Arabic name, 'The Father of al-Qūrq' or 'The Town of the Father of al-Qūrq'.
Alcalá de los Gazules	Qal'at Jazūla (قلعة جزولة)			Founded with Arabic name, 'The Fortress of Jazūla'.
Alcalá de Guadaíra	Qal'at Jābir (قلعة جابر)			Founded with Arabic name, 'The Fortress of Jābir'.
Alcala de Henares	Qal'at Hināris (قلعة هنارس) or Madīnat al-Mā'idah (مدينة المائدة)			
Alcántara	Qanṭarat as-Sayf (قَنْطَرَة السَّيْفِ) or al-Qanṭarah (القنطرة)			Founded with Arabic name, 'The Arched Bridge of the Sword' or 'The Arched Bridge'.
Alcantarilla	Qanṭarat 'Ashkābah (قنطرة اشكابة)			Founded with Arabic name, 'The Arched Bridge of 'Ashkābah'
Alcañiz	al-Kanā'is (الكنائس)			Founded with Arabic name, 'The Churches'.
Alcaraz	Jabal al-Karaz (جبل الكرز)			Founded with Arabic name, 'The Mountain of Cherry'
Alcaucín	al-Qawsayn (القَوْسَيْنِ)			Founded with Arabic name, 'The Two Arches'.
Alcázar de San Juan	al-Qaṣr (القصر)			Founded with Arabic name, 'The Castle'.
Alcazarén	al-Qaṣrayn (القَصْرَين)			Founded with Arabic name, 'The Two Castles'.
Alcolea	al-Qulay'ah (القُلَيعة)			Founded with Arabic name, 'The Little Castle'.
Alcúdia	al-Qudiah (القودية) or al-Kudiah (الكُدية)			Founded with Arabic name, the name comes from the Maghrebi Arabic word al-Kidya (الكدية), which means 'The Plateau'.
Alcuéscar	Al-Qāwāsqar			Founded with Arabic name
Alfambra	al-Ḥamrāʼ (الْحَمْرَاء)			Founded with Arabic name, 'The Red One'.
Alfamén	al-Ḥammām (الحمَّام) or al-Fahīmn (الفهيمن)			Founded with Arabic name, al-Ḥammām (الحمَّام) 'The Bathhouse'.
Alfarnate	al-Farnat (الفرنت)			Founded with Arabic name, 'Flour Mill'.
Algaida	al-Ghaīḍah (الغَيضة)			Founded with Arabic name, 'The Grove'.
Algarrobo	al-Kharrūbah (الخَرُّوبة) or al-Kharrūb (الخَرُّوب)			Founded with Arabic name
Algeciras	al-Jazīrah al-Khaḍrā' (الجزيرة الخضراء)			Founded with Arabic name, 'The Green Island'.
Alhama de Murcia	al-Ḥammah (الحَمّة) or Ḥammat Mursiyah (حَمّة مرسية)			Founded with Arabic name, 'The Hot Springs' or 'The Hot Springs of Mursiyah'.
Alhambra	al-Ḥamrāʼ (الْحَمْرَاء) or al-Qalʻatu al-Ḥamrāʼ (الْقَلْعَةُ ٱلْحَمْرَاءُ)			Founded with Arabic name, 'The Red One' or 'The Red Fortress'.
Alhaurín de la Torre	Burj al-Ḥawrīn (برج الحَورِيِّين)			Founded with Arabic name, 'Tower of the Hawwara'.
Alicante	Laqant (لقنت) or al-Qant (القنت)			Arabisation of the Latin Lucentum, which comes from the Greek Leuké ("white").
Almáchar	al-Makhar (المَخَر)			Founded with Arabic name
Almadén	al-Mā'din (المعدن)			Founded with Arabic name, 'The Metal'.
Almansa	al-Manṣaf (المَنْصَف)			Founded with Arabic name, 'The area half-way through the road'.
Almassora	al-Manṣūrah (المنصورة) or al-Maḥṣūrah (المحصورة)			Founded with Arabic name, 'The Victorious one'; named after the Andalusian military leader al-Manṣūr, while al-Maḥṣūrah translates to 'The Confined one'.
Almazán	al-Maḥṣan (المَحْصَن)			Founded with Arabic name, 'The Fortified'.
Almenar	al-Manār (المَنار)			Founded with Arabic name, 'The Illuminated one'.
Almensilla	al-Manzilah (الَمنزِلَة)			Founded with Arabic name, 'The House'.
Almería	al-Mariyyah (المَرِيَّة)			Founded with Arabic name
Almonacid de la Cuba	al-Munastīr (المُنَستير)			Founded with Arabic name, Arabized form of the word monastery.
Almudaina	al-Mudainah (المُدَينة)			Founded with Arabic name, 'The Little City'.
Almuñécar	al-Munakkab (المُنَكَّب) or Ḥiṣn al-Munakkab (حصن المُنَكَّب)			Founded with Arabic name
Alovera	al-Ḥuwayrah (الحُوَيْرَة)			Founded with Arabic name
Alpujarras	al-Busharāt (البُشارات)			Founded with Arabic name
Alquézar	al-Qaṣr (القصر)			Founded with Arabic name, 'The Castle'.
Alzira	Jazīrat Shaqr (جزيرة شَقْر)			Founded with Arabic name, 'The Island of Júcar/Xúquer', with Shaqr being the Arabic name for the Júcar/Xúquer river.
Andalusia	al-'Andalus (الأَنْدَلُس)			al-Andalus is the name that the Muslims gave to the Iberian Peninsula, it is mainly used to refer to the Muslim ruled regions of Iberia during the Middle Ages, the name may be derived from the name of the Vandals. The modern autonomous community of 'Andalusia' is named after it.
Ardales	Arḍīṭ (أَرْضِيطُ) or Ḥarshafa (حرشفة)			According to 'A Dictionary of Spanish Place Names', the original name of Ardales was Cardales, which means 'Thistle fields', and later turned into Hardares. The Arabic version then became 'Harsafa' which means ‘edible thistle’. ['Harsafa' is most likely referring to the singular form of Cardoon in Arabic, which is Ḥarshafa]. Arḍīṭ may have also originated from Hardares, however that is unconfirmed.
Arriate	ar-Rīyāḍ (الرِّيَاض)			Founded with Arabic name, 'The Gardens'.
Axarquía	ash-Sharqiyah (الشرقية)			Founded with Arabic name, 'The Eastern One'.
Azofra	as-Sukhrah (السُّخرة)			Founded with Arabic name
Azuqueca de Henares	as-Sukaykah (السُّكَيكة)			Founded with Arabic name, comes from the Arabic word Sikah (سكة), and translates to 'The Little Lane'.
Badajoz	Baṭalyaws (بَطَلْيَوْس)			Founded with Arabic name
Banyalbufar	Banī al-Baḥar (بني البحر)			A possible etymology, 'People of the Sea' or 'Tribe of the Sea'.
Belchite	Balshal or Bilshid			A possible etymology
Benacazón	Binā' Qassūm (بناء قَسّوم) or Ibn/Banī Qassūm (ابن/بني قَسّوم)			Founded with Arabic name, 'The Building of Qassūm'; Ibn/Banī Qassūm translates to 'The Son/Descendants of Qassūm'.
Benadalid	Ibn ad-Dalīl (ابن الدليل)			Founded with Arabic name, 'Son of the Guide'.
Benaguasil	Ibn al-Wazir(ابن الوزير) or Banī al-Wazir(بني الوزير)			Founded with Arabic name, 'The Son/Descendants of al-Wazir', al-Wazir was the family that founded the city over the ruins of a Roman villa.
Benahavís	Binā' Ḥabīsh (بناء حبيش)			Founded with Arabic name, 'The Building of Ḥabīsh'. The word Ḥabīsh could have come from the Arabic word Ḥabashi (حبشي), which meant Ethiopian, but was used to identify any dark-skinned African; this could indicate that the city was founded by a man of Sub-Saharan African descent.
Benalmádena	Binā' al-Ma'dānah (بناء المَعْدَانة) or Ibn/Banī al-Ma'dan (ابن/بِنى المعدن) or Banī al-Madīnah (بِنى المدينة)			Founded with Arabic name. Binā' al-Ma'dānah (بناء المَعْدَانة) translates to 'The Building of Metal', Ibn/Banī al-Ma'dan (ابن/بِنى المعدن) translates to 'Son/Descendants of Metal', Banī al-Madīnah (بِنى المدينة) translates to 'Descendants of the City'.
Benarrabá	Ibn ar-Rabāḥ (ابن الرَّبَاح) or Banū/Banī ar-Rabāḥ (بنو/بني الرَّبَاح)			Founded with Arabic name. Ibn ar-Rabāḥ (ابن الرَّبَاح) translates to 'Son of ar-Rabāḥ', Banū/Banī ar-Rabāḥ (بنو/بني الرَّبَاح) translates to 'Descendants of ar-Rabāḥ'.
Binissalem	Banī Sālim (بني سالم)			Founded with Arabic name. Banī Sālim (بني سالم) translates to 'Descendants of Sālim'.
Bufalí	Abū Khālid (أبو خالد)			Founded with Arabic name. Abū Khalid (أبو خالد) translates to 'Father of Khālid'.
Bujaraloz	Burj al-Arus			Founded with Arabic name
Bujalance	Burj al-Ḥansh (بُرج الحنش)			Founded with Arabic name Burj al-Ḥansh (بُرج الحنش) translates to 'Tower of al-Ḥansh', al-Ḥansh is a type of snake known as the Eastern racer.
Cáceres	Qaṣrash (قصرش) or Qaṣrāsh (قصرآش)			Arabisation of Latin Norba Caesarina or Castra Cæcilia
Cádiz	Qādis (قادِس) or Ghādish (غادِش)			Arabized form of its old Latin name Gades.
Cadrete	Qadrit			Arabized form of its old Latin name Cateracta, the Arabic pronunciation is unknown.
Calatañazor	Qal'āt An-Nusūr (قلعة النُسُور)			Founded with Arabic name: 'Fortress of the Vultures'
Calatayud	Qal‘at ’Ayyūb (قلعة أيوب)			Founded with Arabic name: 'Fortress of ’Ayyūb'
Calatrava la Vieja	Qalʿat Rabāḥ (قلعة رَبَاح)			Founded with Arabic name: 'Fortress of Rabāḥ'
Cartagena	Qarṭājannah (قَرْطاجَنَّة)			Arabized form of its Latin name Carthaginem
Caspe	Qaṣb (قصب) or Qasb (قسب)			Possibly either an Arabized form of its original name or founded with an Arabic name. The place name Casp was documented in Andalusi sources as "Qsp", "Qasp" or "Qasb", and has been related to the Arabic word "Casba". [This could be referring to Qaṣba (قصبة), which translates to 'Rod'.]
Castile	al-Qashtālah (القشتالة) or al-Qila' (القلاع)			al-Qashtālah is the Arabized form of its original name Castille, while al-Qila' is a translation of the name to Arabic, and translates to 'The Castles'.
Castillo de Locubín	Ḥiṣn al-'Uqbān (حصن العِقْبَان) or Ḥiṣn al-'Uqab (حصن العُقاب)			Founded with Arabic name: Ḥiṣn al-'Uqbān translates to 'Fortress of the Eagles', while Ḥiṣn al-'Uqab translates to 'Fortress of the Eagle' The Battle of Las Navas de Tolosa took place here, and is known in Arabic as The Battle of al-'Uqab, named after Ḥiṣn al-'Uqab.
Castillo de Montemayor	Ulyat Kanbaniya			
Cazarabet	Qaṣr Abbād			Founded with Arabic name
Ceuta	Sabtah (سَبْتَة)			The area was known as Septem Fratres (Seven Brothers) in Latin, this would eventually be shortened to Septum or Septa, and would later become known as Sabtah in Arabic.
Cieza	Madinat Siyāsah (مدينة سياسة) or Madinat as-Siyāsah (مدينة السياسة)			It is possible that the name Madinat Siyāsah (City of Siyāsah) is an Arabized form of the city's previous name, Segisa, which was mentioned by Ptolemy. The name Madinat as-Siyāsah may also be of Arabic origin, and would then translate to 'The City of Politics'.
Ciudad Real	Māslākha			
Ciutadella de Menorca	Madīnat al-Jazīra (مدينة الجزيرة) or Madīnat Menūrqah (مدينة منورقة)			'The City of the Island' and 'The City of Menorca', respectively
Cordoba	Qurṭubah (قرطبة)			Arabized form of its old Roman name Corduba, which in theory might be the Latinized form of the Phoenician-Punic qart ṭūbah meaning 'good town'.
Covadonga	Ṣakhrat Bilāy (صخرة بلاي)			'The Boulder of Pelagius'; named after the founder of the Kingdom of Asturias, who defeated the Arabs there in the first ever Christian victory in Iberia, known as 'Siege of the Boulder' (حصار الصخرة) in Arabic and as 'Battle of Covadonga' in English.
Cuarte de Huerva	Qūwart (قورت)			
Cuenca	Quwanka (قُوَنْكَةُ) or Quwanqa (قُوَنْقَةُ) or Kuwanka (كونكة)			Under the Arabs the castle of the city was known as 'qunka' which has no other feature than to reflect the previous Christian name, and so the name may be of Arabic origin. The name may also be an Arabization of the original Roman name, which derives from the Latin conca meaning "river basin", referring to the gorge of the rivers Júcar and Huécar.
Cuevas del Almanzora	Kuhūf al-Manṣurah (كهوف المنصورة)			'The Caves of al-Manṣurah' al-Manṣurah translates to 'The Victorious one' and is named after the Andalusian military leader al-Manṣūr.
Cutanda	Qutunda (قُتُنْدَةُ)			Possibly an Arabized form of its original name, which is Germanic kotta ‘heights’ echoed by Latin quota.
Chiprana	Shibrānah (شبرانة)			Possibly an Arabized form of its original Roman name Cipriano.
Daroca	Qal'at Darūqah (قلعة دَرُوقَةَ)			Qal'at Darūqah, which translates to 'Fortress of Darūqah', was given to the city after its conquest by the Arabs.
Deià	Ḍay'ah (ضيعة)			Founded with Arabic name
Dénia	Dāniyyah (دانيّة)			Arabized form of its Visigothic name Denia.
Ebro River	Nahr 'Ibrah (نَهْرُ إِبْرَةَ) or Nahr Ṭurṭūshah (نَهْرُ طَرْطُوشَةَ)			Translates to "River of 'Ibrah" and "River of Tortosa" respectively
Écija	Istijjah (إِسْتِجَةُ) or Isījjah (إسيجة)			Arabized form of its Roman name Astigi.
Elche	'Alsh (ألش)			Arabized form of its Roman name Ilici or Illice.
Fabara	Ḥawwārah (حوارة) or Fawārah (فوارة)			The name comes from either the Hawwara Berber tribe, or from the Arabic Fawārah (فوارة), which translates to fountain, sparkling spring, or geyser.
Faraján	Farḥān			Founded with Arabic name, translates to 'Happy' or 'Delightful'
Fuentes de Ebro	Funtush			Founded with Arabic name
Gállego	Yalaq			Founded with Arabic name
Genalguacil	Jannat Al-Wāzir			Founded with Arabic name
Generalife	Jannat Al-Arīf			Founded with Arabic name
Getafe	Al-Jādāfih			Founded with Arabic name
Girona	Jarandah (جَرَنْدَةُ) or Jirūnah (جِيرُونَةُ)			
Granada	Gharnāṭah (غرناطة)			The meaning and origin of the name are unknown, it could be of Arabic, Berber, or Latin origin.
Guadalajara	Wādī Al-Ḥijārah (وادي الحجارة) and Madinat al-Faraj (مَدِينَة الفَرَج)			Founded with Arabic name. Wādī Al-Ḥijāra translates to 'The Valley of Stones', and Madinat al-Faraj translates to 'The City of al-Faraj'.
Guadalcanal	Wādi Al-Khānnā			Founded with Arabic name
Guadalcázar	Wādi Al-Qasr			Founded with Arabic name
Guadalevín	Wadī Al-Libān			Founded with Arabic name
Guadalquivir	Wādi Al-Qabīr			Founded with Arabic name
Guadalope	Wādi Al-Lawh			Founded with Arabic name
Guadasséquies	Wadi As-Sukkār			Founded with Arabic name
Guadix	Wādi Al-Ash			Founded with Arabic name
Huelva	Walbah (وَلْبَة) or 'Unbah (أونبة)			Arabized form of its old Roman name Onuba.
Huerva	Warbah			Founded with Arabic name
Huesca	Washqah (وشقة)			Arabized form of its old Roman name Osca.
Igualeja	Balāt Al-Wālay			
Íscar	Hisn Al-Asqār			Founded with Arabic name
Isla de Las Palomas	Jazīra Al-Tārif			
Jaén	Jayyān			Founded with Arabic name
Jalón	Shalun (شَلوْن)			Founded with Arabic name
Jerez de la Frontera	Sharīsh (شَرِيش) or Shirsh (شِرِش)			
Jiloca	Shaluqah			Founded with Arabic name
Júcar River	Nahr Shaqr (نهر شَقْر)			Nahr Shaqr translates to 'The River of Shaqr', Shaqr is most likely an Arabized form of the river's original name.
Lleida	Lāridah (لاردة)			
Lucena	al-Yusānah (اليُسَانَة)			Arabized form of its Hebrew name Eliossana.
Macharaviaya	Māšār Abu Yahyā			Founded with Arabic name
Madrid	Mājriṭ (مجريط)			Founded with Arabic name, comes from the Arabic word Majrā (مجرى), which means stream.
Mairena del Aljarafe	Maharana			Founded with Arabic name
Maluenda	Malwanda			Founded with Arabic name
María de Huerva	Ḥiṣn Al-Mariyya			Founded with Arabic name
Marratxí	Al-Murāqšī			Founded with Arabic name
Medina Azahara	Madinah Az-Zāhra			Founded with Arabic name
Medinaceli	Madinah As-Salīm			Founded with Arabic name
Medina-Sidonia	Madinah Aš-Šadūna			Founded with Arabic name
Mérida	Māridah (ماردة)			Arabized form of its old Latin name Emerita.
Mequinenza	Miknāsa (مكناسة)			The name comes from Miknasa, a Zenata Berber tribe, this was Latinized as Miquinencia and later turned into its modern Spanish name Mequinenza.
Morón de la Frontera	Mawrūr (مورور)			
Montañana	Munt Anyāt			Founded with Arabic name
Monzalbarba	Manzil Barbar			
Muel	Muwīl			Founded with Arabic name
Nájera	An-Nājarrah			Founded with Arabic name
Navarre	Balāt Al-Baškans			
Orés	Warša			Founded with Arabic name
Palma de Mallorca	Madinah Al-Mayūrqah			
Pechina	Bajjānah (بَجَّانَة)			
Puebla de Almenara	Garīp al-Mānārah			Founded with Arabic name
Ricla	Rikla			Founded with Arabic name
Rueda de Jalón	Ḥiṣn Rūṭat al-Yahūd (حصن روطة اليهود)			Founded with Arabic name, translates to 'The Fortress of the Jewish Rūṭah'.
Salobreña	Shlūbiniah (شلوبينية) or Shalūbaniah (شَلُوبَنِيَة)			
Santaella	Shant Yālah (شَنْتَ يَالَه)			
Santiago de Compostela	Shānt Yāqūb (شانت ياقوب)			
Segovia	Shqūbiyah (شقوبيّة) or Shkūbiyah (شكوبية)			
Segura	War Al-Abyād			
Seville	Ishbīliyyah (أشبيليّة)			
Sierra de Alcaraz	Silsilat Jibāl al-Karaz (سلسلة جبال الكرز)			'The Cherry Mountain range'
Simancas	Sīmānqah (سيمانقة) or Shānt Mānkash (شانت مانكش)			
Somed	Ḥiṣn Sumid			Founded with Arabic name
Tarifa	Tarīfah			Founded with Arabic name
Tarragona	Ṭarraqūnah (طَرَّكُونَةُ)			Arabized form of its old Latin name Tarraconis.
Teruel	Ṭarwīl (طَرْوِيلُ)			Founded with Arabic name
Toledo	Ṭulayṭulah (طُلَيْطِلَة)			Arabized form of its old Latin name Toletum.
Torre Alháquime	Burj al-Ḥakīm (بُرج الحكيم)			Founded with Arabic name, translates to 'The Tower of al-Ḥakīm'.
Tortosa	Ṭurṭūshah (طرطوشة)			Arabized form of its old Latin name Dertusa or Dertosa.
Trafalgar	Ṭaraf al-Ghār (طرف الغار) or Ṭaraf al-Gharb (طرف الغرب) or al-Ṭaraf al-'Aghar (الطرف الأغر)			Founded with Arabic name. Ṭaraf al-Ghār (طرف الغار) translates to 'Edge/Cape of the Cave/Laurel', Ṭaraf al-Gharb (طرف الغرب) translates to 'Edge/Cape of the West'. In modern Arabic, the place is sometimes re-transcribed as al-Ṭaraf al-'Aghar (الطرف الأغر).
Tudela	Tuṭaylah (تُطَيْلَة)			Arabized form of its old Latin name Tutela.
Úbeda	'Ubbdah (أُبَّدَةُ) or 'Abbdat al-'Arab (أبّدة العرب)			Founded with Arabic name
Valladolid	Balād al-Walīd (بلد الوليد)			'The Land of al-Walīd' (disputed)
Zafra	Ṣafra' (صفراء)			Founded with Arabic name, translates to 'The Yellow One'.
Zamora	Sammūrah (سَمُّورة) or Zammūrah(زَمُّورَة)			Arabized form of its old Visigothic name Semure.
Zaragoza	Saraqusṭah (سَرَقُسْطَةُ)			Arabized form of its old Greco-Roman name Caesaraugusta (Καισαραυγοῦστα).
Zuera	Ṣukhayrah (بلدية صُخَيرة) or Zuhayrah (زُهَيرة)			Founded with Arabic name, Ṣukhayrah translates to 'Little Rock' while Zuhayrah translates to 'Little Flower'.

== Sweden ==
Sweden
English name	Arabic name	Endonym		Notes
English name	Arabic name	Name	Language	Notes
Sweden	Asūj (أَسُوج)			This was the pre-modern arabic exonym for Sweden, nowadays almost all Arabs use as-Sūwayd (السُوَيد).

== Turkmenistan ==
Turkmenistan
English name	Arabic name	Endonym		Notes
English name	Arabic name	Name	Language	Notes
Ashgabat	'Ishq Ābād (عشق أباد)			The literal name of the city is "city of love" or "city of devotion", and the name consists of the Arabic word 'Ishq (عشق), which means 'Love or Want', and the Persian suffix Ābād (أباد), which means 'City'.

== See also ==
- List of Arabic place names
