= Almenara =

Almenara may refer to:

- Almenara, Minas Gerais, a city in Brazil
- Almenara, Castellón, a municipality in Castellón province, Spain
- Almenara de Adaja, a municipality in Valladolid province, Spain
- Almenara de Tormes, a municipality in Salamanca province, Spain
- Puebla de Almenara, a municipality in Cuenca province, Spain
- Almenara (Madrid), a neighborhood in the district of Tetuán, in the municipality of Madrid, Community of Madrid, Spain
- Pico Almenara, the highest mountain of Sierra de Alcaraz, Spain

== See also ==
- Battle of Almenar, a battle in Spain fought 1710
