= Algarrobilla =

Algarrobilla, small carob (algarrobo) in Spanish, also written algarovilla, may refer to:

- Balsamocarpon brevifolium, a plant species found in Chile
- Prosopis humilis, a flowering plant and a tree species found in Argentina
- Prosopis juliflora, the bayahonda blanca, a shrub or small tree species native to Mexico, South America and the Caribbean
- Prosopis nigra, the black carob tree, a leguminous tree species that inhabits the Gran Chaco ecoregion in Argentina and Paraguay
- Senna sophera, a plant in the genus Senna
- Pithecellobium parvifolium, a plant in the genus Pithecellobium

== See also ==
- Algarrobina, a syrup made from the black carob tree
