= Zaragoza (comarca) =

Zaragoza Comarca Comarca de Zaragoza
- Comarca
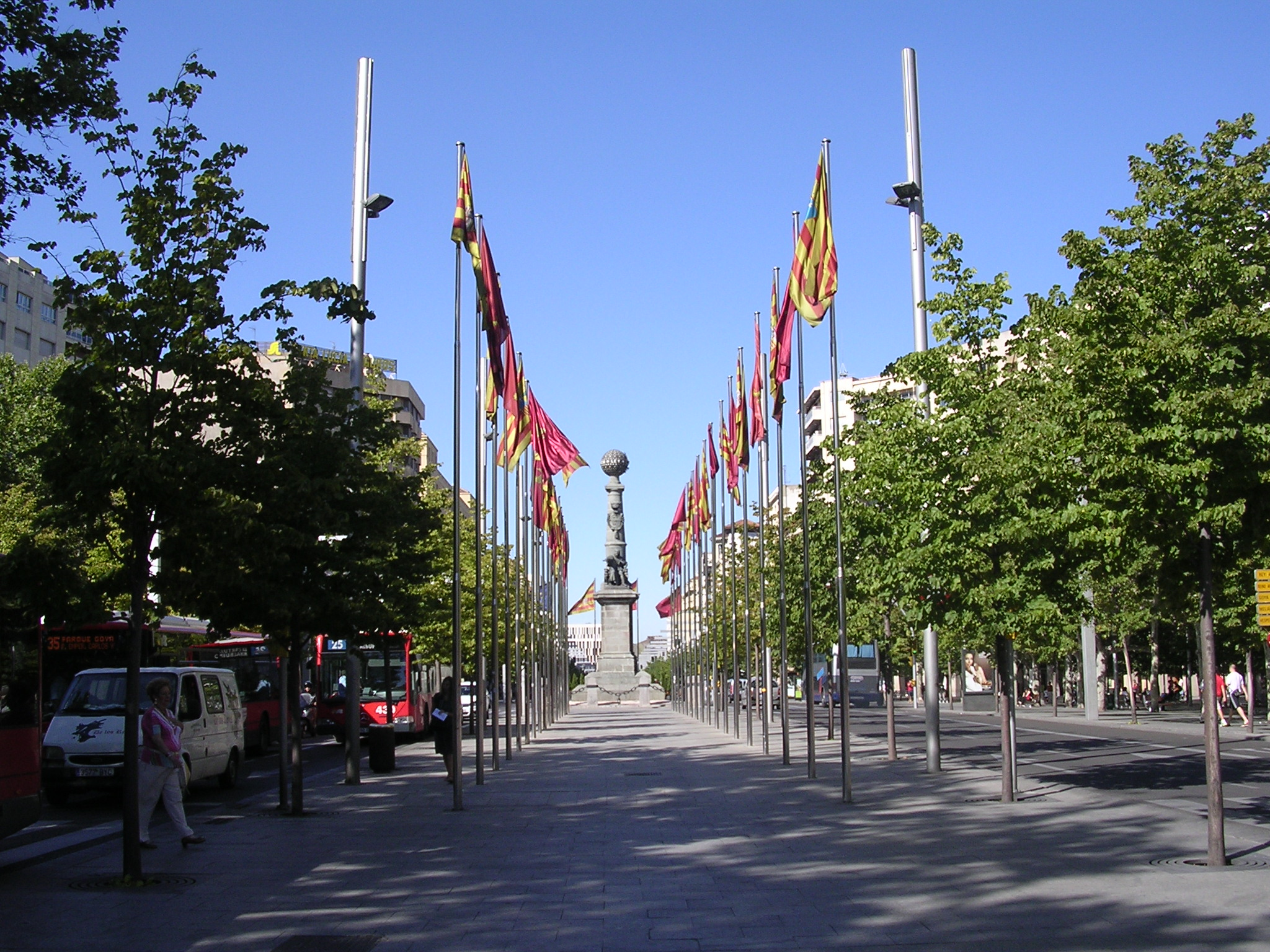
- Plaza de Aragón in Zaragoza city

- Coordinates: 41°34′N 0°54′W
- Country: Spain
- Autonomous community: Aragon
- Province: Zaragoza
- Capital: nil
- Municipalities: List: See text

Area
  - Total: 2,288.8 km^{2} (883.7 sq mi)

Population
  - Total: 739,788
  - Density: 323.22/km^{2} (837.14/sq mi)
- Time zone: UTC+1 (CET)
  - Summer (DST): UTC+2 (CEST)
- Largest municipality: Zaragoza

Zaragoza Comarca is a comarca in Aragon, Spain. It is located in the center of Zaragoza Province and includes Zaragoza metropolitan area.

Zaragoza city gives its name to this comarca.

== Municipalities ==
Alfajarín, Botorrita, El Burgo de Ebro, Cadrete, Cuarte de Huerva, Fuentes de Ebro, Jaulín, María de Huerva, Mediana de Aragón, Mozota, Nuez de Ebro, Osera de Ebro, Pastriz, La Puebla de Alfindén, San Mateo de Gállego, Utebo, Villafranca de Ebro, Villamayor de Gállego, Villanueva de Gállego, Zaragoza, Zuera

== See also ==
- Zaragoza Province
