= List of Arabic place names =

This is a list of traditional Arabic place names. This list includes:

- Places involved in the history of the Arab world and the Arabic names given to them.
- Places whose official names include an Arabic form.
- Places whose names originate from the Arabic language.

All names are in Standard Arabic and academically transliterated. Most of these names are used in modern times, but many of these Arabic forms are not in active use in their namesake places—indeed, modern Arabic names for the same places have often changed to reflect and respect the place's modern non-Arabic pronunciation.

== ا ʼAlif ==
- أبّذة العرب Ubbaḏaḧ al-ʻArab. Úbeda, Spain
- أبو ظبي ʼAbū Ẓabi. Abu Dhabi, United Arab Emirates
- أبو غريب ʼAbū Ġurayb. Abu Ghraib, Iraq
- أبو قير ʼAbū Qīr. Abu Qir, Egypt
- أحساء al-ʼAḥsāʼ. Al-Hasa, Saudi Arabia
- أحواز al-ʼaḥwazʼ. Al-Ahwaz, Iran
- اَلْعَلَمَيْن al-ʼalamain. Alamein; Enham Alamein, United Kingdom (part of name)
- الاركون al-Arkun. Alarcón, Spain
- القلعة al-qalaʿâ. Alcalá de Henares, Spain
- القلعة al-qalaʿâ. Alcalà de Xivert, Spain
- المُنَكَّب al-Munakkab. Almuñécar, Spain
- المدور al-Mudawār. Almudévar, Spain
- اخميم Aḫmīm. Akhmim, Egypt
- إرتريّا ʼIritriyyā. Eritrea actually derived from Greek ερυθρος, red (location next to the Red Sea).
- الأردنّ al-ʼUrdunn. Jordan
- أركوش ʼArkūš. Arcos, Spain
- أرنيط ʼArnīṭ. Arnedo, Spain
- أريحا ʼArīḥā. Jericho, Palestine
- أريولة ʼUryūlaḧ. Orihuela, Spain
- إستجّة ʼIstiǧǧaḧ. Écija, Spain
- إسدود ʼIsdūd. Ashdod, Israel
- إسرائيل ʼIsrāʼīl. Israel
- الإسكندرون al-ʼIskandarūn. İskenderun, Turkey (from Αλεξάνδρεια, Alexandria, as are all the other names derived from Alexander the Great, who founded these cities)
- إسكندريّة ʼIskandariyyaḧ. Iskandariya, Iraq
- الإسكندريّة al-ʼIskandariyyaḧ. Alexandria, Egypt
- اسمارا Asmārā. Asmara, Eritrea
- أسوان ʼAswān. Aswan, Egypt
- أشبيليّة ʼIshbīliyyaḧ. Seville, Spain
- أطار ʼAṭār. Atar, Mauritania
- ألش ʼAlš. Elche, Spain.
- الإمارات العربيّة المتّحدة al-ʼImārāt al-ʼArabiyyaḧ al-Muttaḥidaḧ. United Arab Emirates
- الأندلس al-ʼAndalus. Al-Andalus; Andalusia, Spain
- أمّ الفحم ʼUmm al-Faḥm. Umm al-Fahm, Israel
- أمّ قصر ʼUmm Qaṣr. Umm Qasr, Iraq
- أمّ القيوين ʼUmm al-Qaywayn. Umm al-Qaiwain, United Arab Emirates
- انتاكيّة Antākiyyaḧ. Antioch, Turkey
- انواكشوط Anwākšūṭ. Nouakchott, Mauritania
- الشرقية Aš-Šarqiyya. Axarquía, Spain
- أيلة ʼAylaḧ. Eilat, Israel

== ب Bāʼ ==
- باتنة Bātnaḧ. Batna, Algeria
- بني قاسم Bani Qasim. Benicasim, Spain
- بينيدورم Bēní Dōrm. Benidorm, Spain
- بينيتاشيل Bēní ta txell. Benitachell, Spain
- باقة الغربيّة Bāqaḧ al-Ġarbiyyaḧ. Baqa al-Gharbiyye, Israel
- البحرين al-Baḥrayn. Bahrain
- بحرية Baḥrīyah or باب الغرب Bab al-Gharb. Bagheria, Italy
- برغش Burġuš. Burgos, Spain
- بريدة Burayda. Buraidah, Saudi Arabia
- ﭐَلبَسِيط al-Basīṭ. Albacete, Spain
- البصرة al-Baṣraḧ. Basra, Iraq
- بلنسيّة Balansiyyaḧ. Valencia, Spain
- بَلَرْم Balarm. Palermo, Italy
- بلد الوليد Balad al-Walid. Valladolid, Spain
- بَطَلْيَوْس Baṭalyaws. Badajoz, Spain
- بعقوبه Baʻqūbaḧ. Baquba, Iraq
- بغداد Baġdād. Baghdad, Iraq
- بنبلونة Banbalūnaḧ. Pamplona, Spain
- البنت al-Bunt. Alpuente, Spain
- بنغازي Banġāzī. Benghazi, Libya
- بوتلميت Būtilimīt. Boutilimit, Mauritania
- بور سعيد Būr Saʻīd. Port Said, Egypt
- بور سودان Būr Sūdān. Port Sudan, Sudan
- بومرداس Būmardās. Boumerdes, Algeria
- بيت جالا Bayt Ǧālā. Beit Jala, Palestine
- بيت حانون Bayt Ḥānūn. Beit Hanoun, Palestine
- بيت لاهيّة Bayt Lāhiyyaḧ. Beit Lahia, Palestine
- بيت لحم Bayt Laḥm. Bethlehem, Palestine
- بيروت Bayrūt. Beirut, Lebanon
- بيسان Baysān. Bet She'an, Israel
- بئر السّبع Biʼr as-Sabʻ. Beersheba, Israel

== ت Tāʼ ==
- تهامة Tihāmah. Tihamah, Saudi Arabia
- تبوك Tabūk. Tabuk, Saudi Arabia
- تجكجة Tiǧikǧaḧ. Tidjikja, Mauritania
- تدمر Tadmur. Tadmor, Syria
- تيروال Tīrwāl. Teruel, Spain
- تشاد Tašād. Chad
- تركيا Turkiyā. Turkey
- تطيلة Tuṭīlaḧ. Tudela, Navarre, Spain
- تكريت Tikrīt. Tikrit, Iraq
- تلمسان Tilimsān. Tlemcen, Algeria
- تونس Tūnis. Tunis; Tunisia
- تيبازة Tībāzaḧ. Tipasa, Algeria
- تيشيت Tīšīt. Tichit, Mauritania

== ث Ṯhāʼ ==
- ثادق Ṯādiq. Thadig, Saudi Arabia

== ج Ǧīm ==
- جباليّا Ǧabāliyyā. Jabalia, Palestine
- جبل طارق Ǧabal Ṭāriq. Gibraltar
- جبل عليّ Ǧabal ʻAliyy. Jebel Ali, United Arab Emirates
- جبيل Ǧubayl. Byblos, Lebanon
- الجبيل al-Ǧubayl. Jubail, Saudi Arabia
- جدّة Ǧiddaḧ. Jeddah, Saudi Arabia
- جرندة Ǧarundaḧ. Girona, Spain
- الجزائر al-Ǧazāʼir. Algiers; Algeria
- الجزيرة الخضراء al-Ǧazīraḧ al-Khaḍrāʼ. Algeciras, Spain
- جزيرة شقر Ǧazīraḧ Šuqr. Alzira, Spain
- جنين Ǧanīn. Jenin, Palestine
- الجنينة al-Ǧunaynaḧ. Geneina, Sudan
- جيّان Ǧayyān. Jaén, Spain
- جيبوتي Ǧībūtī. Djibouti.
- الجيزة al-Ǧīzaḧ. Giza, Egypt

== ح Ḥāʼ ==
- الـحَـمّـة al-Ḥammah. Alhama de Granada, Spain
- الحجاز al-Ḥiǧāz. Hejaz, Saudi Arabia
- حصن المعدن Ḥiṣn al-Mā'din. Almada, Portugal
- حضرموت Ḥaḍramawt. Hadhramaut, Yemen
- حرمة Ḥarmah. Harmah, Saudi Arabia
- حلب Ḥalab. Aleppo, Syria
- حمص Ḥimṣ. Homs, Syria
- حولا Ḥūlā. Hula, Lebanon
- الحيبة al-Ḥībaḧ. Al-Hibah, Egypt
- حيفا Ḥayfā. Haifa, Israel

Haidar

== خ Khāʼ ==
- خنشلة Khenchela. Khenchela, Algeria
- الخارجة al-Ḫāriǧaḧ. Kharga, Egypt
- خان يونس Ḫān Yūnis. Khan Yunis, Palestine
- الخبر al-Ḫubar. Khobar, Saudi Arabia
- خربت بيت لاحي Ḫirbat Bayt Lāḥī. Khirbet Beit Lei, Palestine
- الخرطوم al-Ḫarṭūm. Khartoum, Sudan
- الخليل al-Ḫalīl. Hebron, Palestine

== د Dāl ==
- الدّاخلة ad-Dāḫilaḧ. Dakhla, Egypt.
- الدّار البيضاء ad-Dār al-Bayḍāʼ. Casablanca, Morocco
- الدمام ad-Dammāmʼ. Dammam, Saudi Arabia
- دار السّلام Dār as-Salām. Dar-es-Salaam, Tanzania
- دانيّة Dāniyyaḧ. Dénia, Spain.
- دبيّ Dubayy. Dubai, United Arab Emirates
- دلّس Dallas. Dellys, Algeria
- دمشق الشّام Dimašq aš-Šām. Damascus, Syria
- الدّوحة ad-Dawḥaḧ. Doha, Qatar
- ديار بكر Diyar Bakr. Diyarbakır, Turkey

== ذ Ḏāl ==
- ذهبان Ḏahbān. Zahban, Saudi Arabia

== ر Rāʼ ==
- رام الله Rām Aḷḷāh. Ramallah, Palestine
- رحمة الله Raḥmatollāh. Ramatuelle, France
- الرّباط ar-Rabāṭ. Rabat, Morocco
- رفح Rafaḥ. Rafah, Palestine
- الرّقّة ar-Raqqaḧ. Raqqa, Syria
- الرّمادي ar-Ramādī. Ramadi, Iraq
- الرّملة ar-Ramlaḧ. Ramla, Israel
- رندة Rundaḧ. Ronda, Spain.
- الرّياض ar-Riyāḍ. Riyadh, Saudi Arabia
- رأس تنورة Raʼs Tannūraḧ. Ras Tanura, Saudi Arabia
- رأس الخيمة Raʼs al-Ḫaymaḧ. Ras al-Khaimah, United Arab Emirates

== ز Zāy ==
- زنجبار Zinǧibār. Zanzibar, Tanzania
- الزّقازيق az-Zaqāzīq. Zagazig, Egypt
- زوارة Zuwāraḧ. Zuwara, Libya
- الزّويرات az-Zuwayrāt. Zouérat, Mauritania

== س Sīn ==
- سامرّاء Sāmarrāʼ. Samarra, Iraq
- سبتة Sabtaḧ. Ceuta, Spain.
- سخنين Saḫnīn. Sakhnin, Israel
- سرقسطة Saraqusṭaḧ. Zaragoza, Spain
- السّعوديّة as-Saʻūdiyyaḧ. Saudi Arabia
- سقطرة Suquṭraḧ. Socotra, Yemen
- السّليمانيّة as-Sulaymāniyyaḧ. Sulaymaniyah, Iraq
- السّماوة as-Samāwaḧ. Samawah, Iraq
- سمّورة Sammūraḧ. Zamora, Spain
- السّودان as-Sūdān. Sudan
- سُوريا / سورية Sūriyā / Sūriyyaḧ. Syria
- سوسة Sūsaḧ. Sousse, Tunisia
- السّويس as-Suways. Suez, Egypt

== ش Šīn ==
- الشّارقة aš-Šāriqaḧ. Sharjah, United Arab Emirates
- شنت فيلب Shanta Fīlibb. Agira, Italy
- شانت مانكش Šānt Mānkaš. Simancas, Spain
- شقبان Shaqabān. Sacavém, Portugal
- شريش Šarīš. Jerez de la Frontera, Spain
- شرم الشّيخ Šarm aš-Šayḫ. Sharm el-Sheikh, Egypt
- شفا عمر Šafā ʻAmr. Shefa-Amr, Israel
- شقوبيّة Šiqūbiyyaḧ. Segovia, Spain
- شلمنقة Šalamanqaḧ. Salamanca, Spain
- شناص Šināṣ. Shinas, Oman
- شنقيط Šinqīṭ. Chinguetti, Mauritania

== ص Ṣād ==
- صا فيتا Ṣā Fītā. Safita, Syria
- صحار Ṣuḥār. Sohar, Oman
- الصّحراء الغربيّة aṣ-Ṣaḥarāʼ al-Gharbiyyaḧ. Western Sahara
- صخرة بلاي Ṣaḫraḧ Bilāy. Covadonga, Spain
- صفد Ṣafad. Safed, Israel
- صلالة Ṣalālaḧ. Salalah, Oman
- صنعاء Ṣanʻāʼ. Sanaá, Yemen
- صور Ṣūr. Tyre, Lebanon
- الصّومال aṣ-Ṣūmāl. Somalia.
- صيدا Ṣaydā. Sidon, Lebanon
- عين قانا Ain Kana. Ain Kana, Lebanon

== ط Ṭāʼ ==
- الطائف aṭ-Ṭāʾif. Ta'if, Saudi Arabia
- طبريّة Ṭabariyyaḧ. Tiberias, Israel
- طرابلس Ṭarābulus. Tripoli, Lebanon; Tripoli, Libya
- طرّاكونة Ṭarrākūnaḧ. Tarragona, Spain
- طرسونة Ṭarasūnaḧ. Tarazona, Spain
- طرطوشة Ṭurṭūšaḧ. Tortosa, Spain
- طرف الغار Ṭaraf al-Ghar. Cape Trafalgar, Spain
- طريفة Ṭarīfaḧ. Tarifa, Spain
- طلبيرة Ṭalabayraḧ. Talavera de la Reina, Spain
- طليطلة Ṭulayṭulaḧ. Toledo, Spain
- طنجة Ṭanǧaḧ. Tangier
- طولكرم Ṭūlkarm. Tulkarm, Palestine
- طيّبة Ṭayyibaḧ. Tayibe, Israel
- طيرة Ṭīraḧ. Tira, Israel

== ظ Ẓāʼ ==
- ظفار Ẓufār. Dhofar, Oman
- الظّهران aẓ-Ẓahrān. Dhahran, Saudi Arabia

== ع ʻAyn ==
- عبادان ʻAbadan. Abadan, Iran
- عجمان ʻAǧmān. Ajman, United Arab Emirates
- عدن ʻAdan. Aden, Yemen
- العراق al-ʻIrāq. Iraq
- عرعر ʻArʻar. Arar, Saudi Arabia
- العريش al-ʻArīš. Al 'Arish, Egypt
- عسقلان ʻAsqalān. Ashkelon, Israel
- العقبة al-ʻAqabaḧ. Aqaba, Jordan
- عكّا ʻAkkā. Akko, Palestine
- عكبرا ʻUkbarā. Ukbara, Iraq
- عمّان ʻAmmān. Amman, Jordan
- عُمان ʻUmān. Oman
- عنّابة ʻAnnābaḧ. Annaba, Algeria
- عنيزة ʻUnayzaḧ. Unaizah, Saudi Arabia

== غ Ġayn ==
- al-Ġahf/al-Kahf. Alquife, Spain
- الغرب al-Gharb. Algarve, Portugal
- الغردقة al-Ġardaqaḧ. Hurghada, Egypt
- غرناطة Ġarnāṭaḧ. Granada, Spain
- غزّة Ġazzaḧ. Gaza, Palestine

== ف Fāʼ ==
- فاس Fās. Fes, Morocco
- الفجيرة Fuǧayraḧ. Fujairah, United Arab Emirates
- فلسطين Filasṭīn. Palestine
- الفلّوجة al-Fallūǧaḧ. Fallujah, Iraq
- فطاني Faṭṭāni. Pattani, Thailand

== ق Qāf ==
- قابس Qābis. Gabès, Tunisia
- قادس Qādis. Cádiz, Spain
- قصُور Qaṣūr Kasur, Pakistan
- القدس Al-Quds. Jerusalem, Israel
- القامشلي al-Qāmišlī. Qamishli, Syria
- منزل القاموق Manzil Al-Qāmūq or علقمة 'Alqāmāh. Alcamo, Italy
- القاهرة al-Qāhiraḧ. Cairo, Egypt
- قلعة أيوب Qal‘at ’Ayyūb. Calatayud, Spain
- قرطاج Qarṭāǧ. Carthage, Tunisia
- قرطاجنة الحلفاء Qarṭāǧannaḧ al-Ḥalfāʼ. Cartagena, Spain
- قرطبه Qurṭubaḧ. Córdoba, Spain
- قرمونة Qarmūnaḧ. Carmona, Spain
- قسنطينة Qusanṭīnaḧ. Constantine, Algeria
- قسطنطينية Qusṭanṭīniyyaḧ. Constantinople (Istanbul), Turkey
- القصر al-Qaṣr. Alcàsser, Spain
- القصر الكبير al-Qaṣr al-Kabīr. Ksar el-Kebir, Morocco
- قصر أبي دانس Qaṣr ʼAbī Dānis. Alcácer do Sal, Portugal
- قصر يانه Qaṣr Yānih. Enna, Italy
- قَطَانِيَةُ Qaṭāniyyah or قَطَالِيَةُ Qaṭāliyyah. Catania, Italy
- قطر Qaṭar. Qatar
- قطيف Qaṭīf. Qatif, Saudi Arabia
- قلعة أيوب Qalʻaḧ ʼAyyūb. Calatayud, Spain
- قلقيلية Qalqīlyaḧ. Qalqilyah, Palestine
- قلنسوة Qalansawaḧ. Qalansawe, Israel
- قلهرة Qalahurraḧ. Calahorra, Spain
- قَلْعَةُ النِّسَاءِ Qal'at an-Nisa'. Caltanissetta, Italy
- القمر al-Qamar / Al-Qumur. Comoros
- قنا Qinā. Qina, Egypt
- القنيطرة al-Qunayṭiraḧ. Quneitra, Syria
- قونكة Qūnkaḧ. Cuenca, Spain
- القيروان al-Qayrawān. Kairouan, Tunisia

== ك Kāf ==
- كربلاء Karbalāʼ. Karbala, Iraq
- كركوك Kirkūk. Kirkuk, Iraq
- الْكِفْل al-Kifl. Kifl, Iraq
- كوت Kūt. Kut, Iraq
- الكوفة al-Kūfaḧ. Kufa, Iraq
- كوم أمبو Kawm ʼUmbū. Kom Ombo, Egypt
- الكويت al-Kuwayt. Kuwait
- كيهيدي Kayhaydī. Kaédi, Mauritania
- كفيرت Kufairet. Kferet, Israel

== ل Lām ==
- اللّاذقيّة al-Lāḏiqiyyaḧ. Latakia, Syria
- لاردة Lāridaḧ. Lleida, Spain
- لّبنان Lubnān. Lebanon
- اللّدّ al-Ludd. Lod, Israel
- لقنت Laqant or القنت al-Qant. Alicante, Spain
- لورقة Lawraqaḧ. Lorca, Spain
- ليبيّا Lībiyyā. Libya
- ليّون Liyyūn. León, Spain

== م Mīm ==
- ماردة Māridaḧ. Mérida, Spain
- مالقة Mālaqaḧ. Málaga, Spain
- المحمرة al-Muḥammara. al Muhammara, Iran
- المدوّر al-Mudawwar. Almodóvar del Campo, Spain
- المدور al-Mudawwar. Almodóvar del Pinar, Spain
- المدور العدنة al-Mudawwar al-Adna. Almodóvar del Río, Spain
- المدوّر al-Mudawwar. Almodôvar, Portugal
- مدينة شدونة Madīnaẗ Šadūnaḧ. Medina-Sidonia, Spain
- المدينة المنوّرة al-Madīnaḧ al-Munawwaraḧ. Medina, Saudi Arabia
- مرتيل Martīl. Martil, Morocco
- مَرْسَى عَلِيّ Marsā 'Ali or مَرْسَى الله Marsā Allāh. Marsala, Italy
- مرسى مطروح Marsā Maṭrūḥ. Marsa Matruh, Egypt
- مرسيّة Mursiyyaḧ. Murcia, Spain
- المريّة al-Mariyyaḧ. Almería, Spain
- مسقط Masqaṭ. Muscat, Oman
- مشهد Mashhad. Mashhad, Iran
- مصر Miṣr. Egypt
- المغرب al-Maghrib. Morocco; Maghreb
- مكّة المكرّمة Makkaḧ al-Mukarramaḧ. Mecca, Saudi Arabia
- ملطة Malṭaḧ. Malta.
- مليلة Malīlaḧ. Melilla, Spain
- المنامة al-Manāmaḧ. Manama, Bahrain
- المنصورة al-Manṣūraḧ. Al Mansurah, Egypt
- مورور Mawrūr. Morón, Spain
- مجريط Majrīṭ. Madrid, Spain
- موروني Mūrūnī. Moroni, Comoros
- موزمبيق Mussa Bin Bique. Mozambique
- الموريتانيّا al-Mūrītāniyyā. Mauritania
- موصل Mawṣil. Mosul, Iraq

== ن Nūn ==
- نابلس Nābulus. Nablus, West Bank
- ناجرة Nāǧiraḧ. Nájera, Spain
- النّاصرة an-Nāṣiraḧ. Nazareth, Israel
- ناصريّة Nāṣiriyyaḧ. Nasiriyah, Iraq
- نجامينا Naǧāmīnā. N'Djamena, Chad
- نجد Naǧd. Najd, Saudi Arabia
- نجران Najrān. Najran, Saudi Arabia
- النّجف an-Naǧaf. Najaf, Iraq
- نزوى Nizwā. Nizwa, Oman

== و Wāw ==
- وادان Wādān. Ouadane, Mauritania
- وادي الحجارة Wādī al-Ḥijāraḧ. Guadalajara, Spain
- وادي الكبير Wādī al-Kabīr. Guadalquivir, Spain
- وادي آش Wādī 'Ash. Guadix, Spain
- الوجاجة al-Wajājaḧ. Al Wajajah, Oman
- وشقة Wašqaḧ. Huesca, Spain
- ولاته Walātaḧ. Oualata, Mauritania
- ولبة Walbaḧ. Huelva, Spain
- وهران Wahrān. Oran, Algeria

== ي Yāʼ ==
- يافا Yāfā. Jaffa, Israel
- يبنة Yibnaḧ. Yavne, Israel
- اليُسَانَة al-Yusānaḧ. Lucena, Spain
- الْياج Al-Yāj or لِياج Liyāj. Acireale, Italy
- اليمن al-Yaman. Yemen
- ينبع البحر Yanbuʻ al-Baḥr. Yanbu' al Bahr, Saudi Arabia

== See also ==
- Glossary of Arabic toponyms
- Arabic exonyms
- Arabic language
- Arabic name
- Maghreb toponymy
- Toponym
