= Glossary of Arabic toponyms =

Glossary of Arabic terms found in Arabic toponyms

PEF Survey of Western Palestine Key Map

The glossary of Arabic toponyms gives translations of Arabic terms commonly found as components in Arabic toponyms. A significant number of them were put together during the PEF Survey of Palestine carried out in the second half of the 19th century.

== A ==
'Ain, pl.: `Ayūn, ʿUyūn
Spring, fountain, source. Examples: El Aaiún
Ab, Abu
Father; as a geographical term it signifies "producing", "containing", etc.;
Arak, pl.: Arkan
Cavern or cliff (among various meanings); see

== B ==
Bab, pl.: Buwab
Gate. Examples Bab el-Mandeb; see
Baḥr
Arabic: بحر - Sea, large river. see
Beit
House. see
Balad
Arabic: بلد (sometimes transliterated as Beled or Belled) - Town; see
Bir
Arabic: بير, Well; see
Birkeh
Artificial pool, tank; see
Buḥayra, Baḥeirah
Arabic: بحيرة, Lake, lagoon; Diminutive of بَحْر (baḥr, “sea”).
Burj
Arabic: برج, Tower, castle; see

== C ==
Casbah
a kind of medina (old city) or fortress; cf. "Qasba"; see

== D ==
Dar
wikt:دار house; see Relevant pages with titles containing Dar
Deir
wikt:دير monastery, convent, cloister (often ruins thereof); see
Derb
wikt:درب road, pass;see
Dhahr
wikt:ظهر ridge;

== H ==
Haram
Sacred place; see
Haud
Reservoir, pond; see

== I ==
Ibn
Son; as a geographical term it signifies "producing", "containing", etc. see

== J ==
Jama'a, Djama'a, Jami'a
place of gathering, community, mosque;
Jazira, Jezireh, Jeziret
Island;
Jebel, Djebel, Jebal, Jabal
mountain;
Jisr
bridge; see
Jubb
(Arabic: جُبّ ): well, pit; see

== K ==
Kafr, Kafar, Kafer, Kufur, Kfar
Ultimately from an unattested "Mari language" through Akkadian and Aramaic, meaning "unfortified town". See the Wiktionary entry at كفر. Equivalent to Modern Hebrew Kfar. Unrelated to kafir or kufr.
Kasbah, Kasba, Kasaba
See Qasba
Khan
From Persian xân, meaning caravanserai. Unrelated to the "Khan" in "Genghis Khan".
- Relevant pages with titles containing Khan
Khirbet, Khurbet, Khirbat, etc.
is the conjunctive form "ruin of" (خربة) of the Arabic word for "ruin" (خرب, khirba, khirbeh, kharab ("ruined"))
Ksar, qsar, plural: ksour, qsour
Maghrebi Arabic; See "Qasr"
Kul'ah, Kal'at, Kalat, Kala, Kaleh
Arabic, Persian. See "Qalat"

== M ==
Mazar
مزار: shrine, grave, tomb, etc. cf. "Mazar (mausoleum)". The placename usually refers to a grave of a saint, ruler, etc.. Examples: Mazar-i-Sharif
Mazra', Mazra'a, Al-Mazra'a, Mazraa
مزرعة, mazraʿa: farm, مزرع, mazraʿ: field, farmland, origin for majra, hamlet in Indian subcontinent

== N ==
Nahr
wikt:نهر, river, with the particular meaning of perennial water course, as opposed to a seasonal one, which is called a wadi; see

== O ==
Oued
In North African Arabic, same as Wadi; see

== Q ==
Qabr, Kabr, pl.:Qubūr
Arabic: قَبْر, pl. Arabic: قُبُور - tomb, grave
Qal'a (construct state: qal'at)
Arabic, Persian. Fortified place, fort, fortress, castle;
Casbah, Kasbah, Qaṣba, Qaṣbah, Qaṣaba
Arabic: القصبة, romanized: al-qaṣaba), a kind of medina (old city) or fortress
Qaṣr, Kaṣr, al-Qaṣr, pl.:Quṣūr
Arabic: قصر, lit. 'palace/castle/fortress', from Latin castrum
- It entered into Spanish and Portuguese placenames in the forms Alcazar, Alcácer
- North African (Maghrebi Arabic) form: Ksar

The dictionary definition of qasr at Wiktionary

== R ==
Ras
wikt:رأس, head, cape, top, peak, etc., see
Rujm, plural: rujum
wikt:رجم, mound, cairn, hill, spur, and also as "stone heap" or "tumulus".

== S ==
souk, sūq, souq
wikt:سوق, "market"

== U ==
Umm
Mother; as a geographical term it signifies "producing", "containing", etc.; cf. "Mother of all"; see

== W ==
Wadi, Wad, North African Arabic: see Oued
Watercourse: stream (often intermittent stream), sometimes dry waterbed, valley

== See also ==
- Toponymy of Maghreb
- Oikonyms in Western and South Asia
- Place names of Palestine
- List of Arabic place names

== Sources ==
- Mann, Joel F. (2005). An international glossary of place name elements. Scarecrow Press. ISBN 978-0-8108-5040-8.
- Negev, Avraham; Gibson, Shimon (2005). Archaeological encyclopedia of the Holy Land (4th, revised, illustrated ed.). Continuum International Publishing Group. ISBN 978-0-8264-8571-7.
- Siddiqi, Akhtar Husain; Bastian, Robert W. (1985). "Urban Place Names in Pakistan: A Reflection of Cultural Characteristics". Names. 29 (1): 65–84. OCLC 500207327.
- Siddiqi, Jamal Mohd (1982). Significance of technical terms in place names—a case-study of Aligarh District. Proceedings of the Indian History Congress. Vol. 43. pp. 332–341. JSTOR 44141245.
