= Jaulín =

Jaulín, Spain
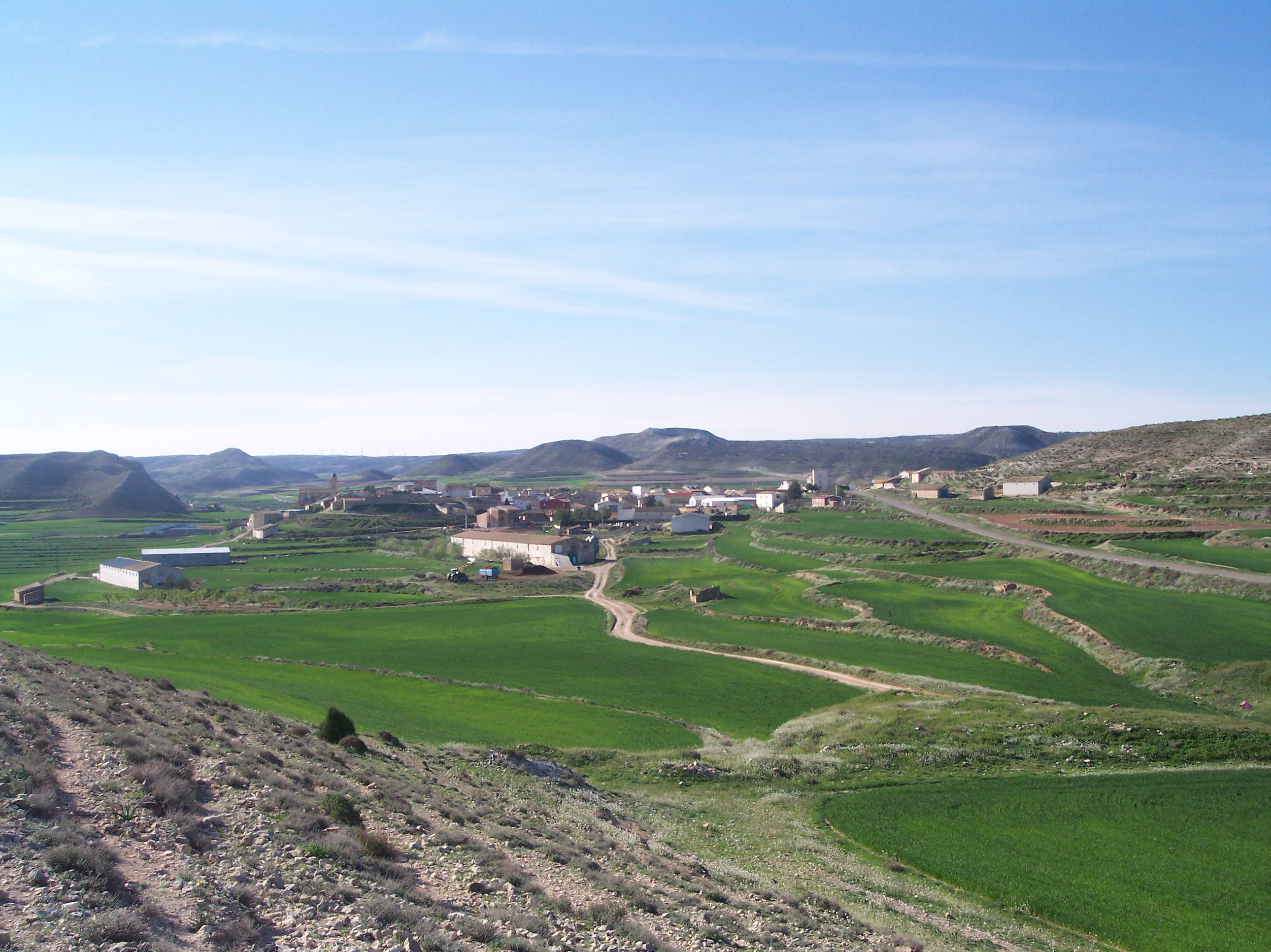

- Flag Coat of arms

- Location within Aragon Location within Spain Location within Europe
- Country: Spain
- Autonomous community: Aragon
- Province: Zaragoza
- Municipality: Jaulín

Area
  - Total: 46 km^{2} (18 sq mi)

Population (2025-01-01)
  - Total: 305
  - Density: 6.6/km^{2} (17/sq mi)
- Time zone: UTC+1 (CET)
  - Summer (DST): UTC+2 (CEST)

Jaulín is a municipality located in the province of Zaragoza, Aragon, Spain. According to the 2004 census (INE), the municipality has a population of 307 inhabitants.

== Points of interest ==
- Gamesa G128-4.5 MW wind turbine

== See also ==
- List of municipalities in Zaragoza
