= Villamayor de Gállego =

Coordinates: 41°41′08″N 0°46′26″W

- Flag Coat of arms

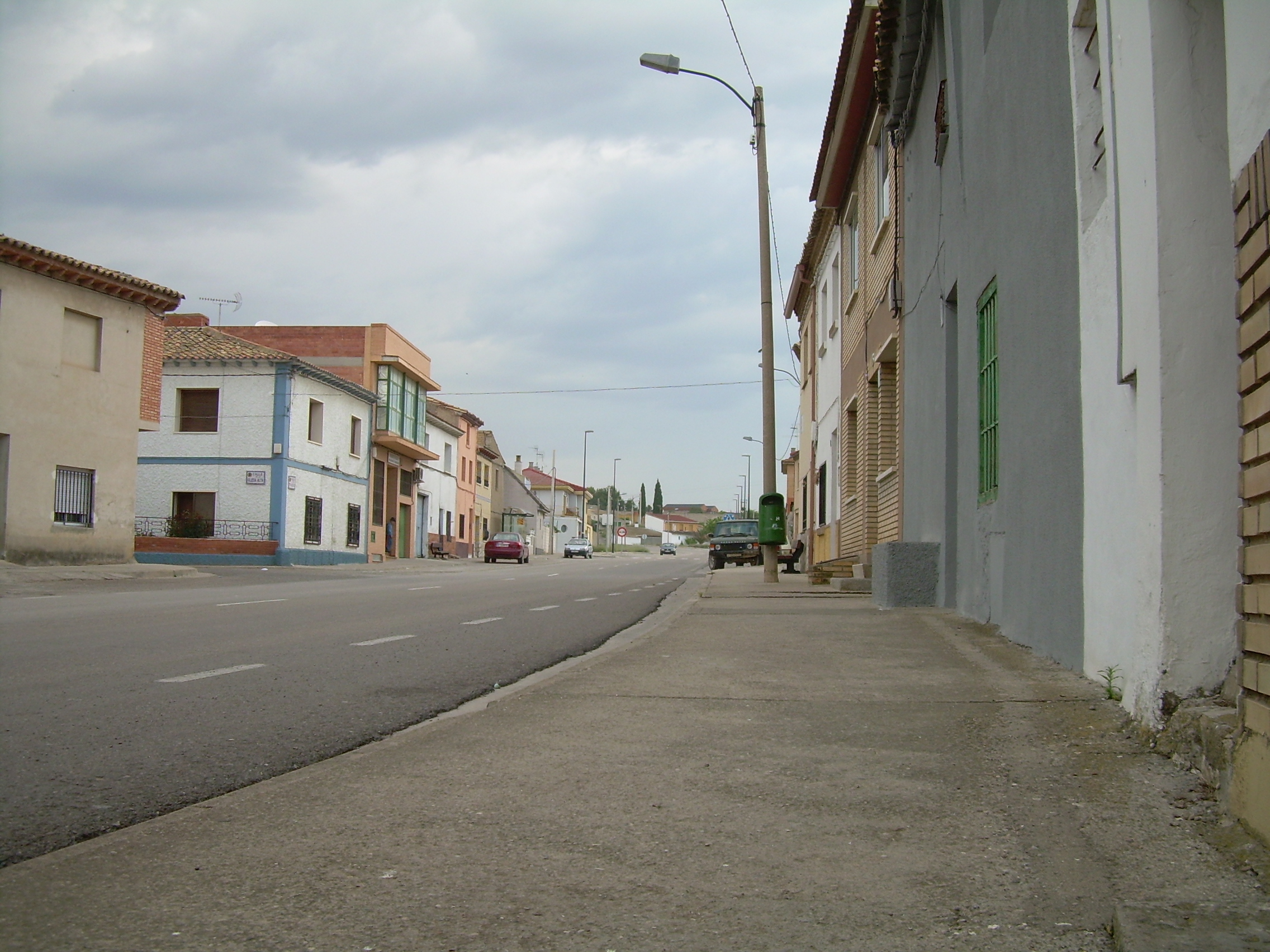
- Country: Spain
- Autonomous community: Aragon
- Province: Zaragoza
- Comarca: Zaragoza Comarca

Area
  - Total: 89.36 km^{2} (34.50 sq mi)

Population (2025-01-01)
  - Total: 2,841
  - Density: 31.79/km^{2} (82.34/sq mi)
- Time zone: UTC+1 (CET)
  - Summer (DST): UTC+2 (CEST)

Villamayor de Gállego is a municipality located in the province of Zaragoza, Aragon, Spain. According to the 2010 census (INE), the municipality has a population of 2,888 inhabitants. Villamayor de Gállego became independent from Zaragoza in 2006.

== See also ==
- List of municipalities in Zaragoza
