= Toponymy of Maghreb =

The toponymy of Maghreb is the product of ancient civilizations, invasions, and migrations of multiple peoples of different origins and languages, recorded primarily via Berber, Arabic, Spanish, and French traditions, but also certain influence of Phoenicians, Ancient Greeks, and the Ancient Rome. The recorded names were often distorted due to imperfection of medieval recording the pronunciation of Berber toponyms by Arabs and further by inadequacy of the records of French colonial administration of the territories of Maghreb (Tunisia, Lybia, Algeria, Morocco, Western Sahara, and Mauretania). The transcription of the names is also aggravated by a variety of local spoken dialects. All these problems have been known since as early as the 11th century, and they still have to be handled by modern researchers and cartographers seeking standardization of toponymy.

The 14th-century Arabic scholar Ibn Khaldun recorded over 1,000 toponyms of Maghreb in his Kitāb al-ʻIbar.

In the toponymy of Maghreb, Mohamed Meouak singles out three linguistic factors: hybrid toponyms (Arabic-Berber), "cross-bred" anthroponyms used in place names, and the interactions between Islamic and Christian topographies. Arabic influence may be classified into replacement of Berber toponymy with Arabic and the Arabization of Berber names.

The issue is also pertinent to atlases of Maghreb in other countries, e.g., in Hungary.

== Table ==
Toponyms of settlements in the Maghreb
Settlement	Country	Historical forms and Names	Meaning
Tetouan	Morocco	Titawin; Tetteguin	Eyes in Berber Languages, plural form of "tiṭṭ" ⵜⵉⵟⵟ.
Rabat	Morocco	Ribāṭ	Fortified monastery; ribāṭ refers to a fortified religious establishment or frontier outpost.
Beni Mellal	Morocco		Beni is derived from the Arabic Bani meaning "Sons of" which corresponds to the Berber Ait, Ath and At. Mellal comes from the Berber root M-L-L meaning white.
Algiers	Algeria	Icosium	The Arabic name al-Jazāʾir (الجزائر), means 'the Islands'.
Tripolis	Libya	Ṭarābulus al-Gharb; Oea	From Greek, meaning three cities.

== See also ==
- Glossary of Arabic toponyms
- List of Arabic place names
