= Arcos =

Arcos or ARCOS can refer to:

== Places ==
=== Brazil ===
- Arcos, Minas Gerais, in Brazil

=== Portugal ===
- Arcos de Valdevez, a municipality in the Viana do Castelo District
- Arcos (Anadia), a civil parish in the municipality of Anadia
- Arcos (Braga), a civil parish in the municipality of Braga
- Arcos (Estremoz), a civil parish in the municipality of Estremoz
- Arcos (Ponte de Lima), a civil parish in the municipality of Ponte de Lima
- Arcos (Tabuaço), a civil parish in the municipality of Tabuaço
- Arcos (Vila do Conde), a civil parish in the municipality of Vila do Conde

=== Spain ===
- Taifa of Arcos, a medieval kingdom in what is now southern Spain
- Arcos de la Frontera, a town in Andalusia, Spain
- Arcos de las Salinas, a town in Aragon, Spain
- Arcos (Madrid), a ward in the district of San Blas-Canillejas, in the city of Madrid
- Arcobrica, old name for Arcos de la Frontera

== Other ==
- Arcos (fish), a genus of clingfishes
- ARCOS, the All Russian Co-operative Society, a purchasing agency of the Soviet Russian government in Britain during the 1920s
- ARCOS LLC, a software system for the utility industry
- ARCOS-1, fiber optic cable system
- Agustín Gómez-Arcos, a Spanish writer
- Federico Arcos, a Spanish anarchist
