= Azofra, Spain =

Azofra
- Municipality
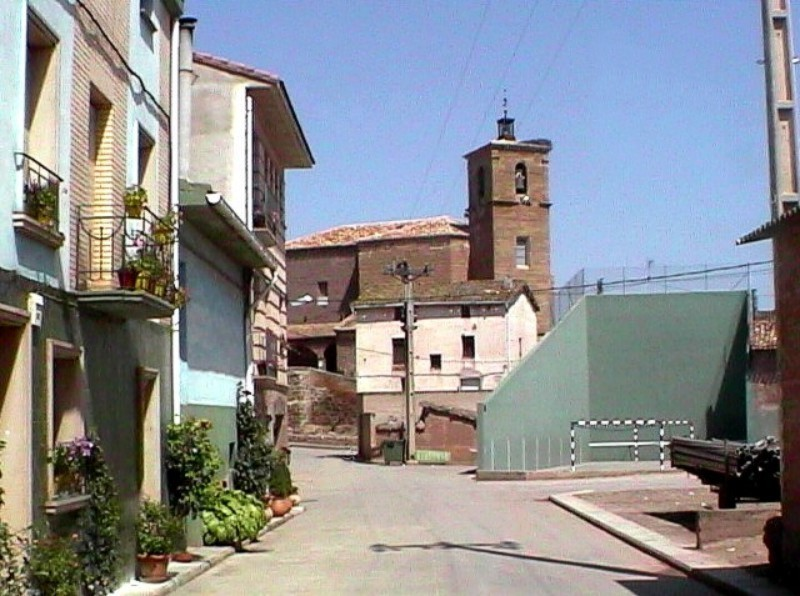

- Location within Rioja Alta (La Rioja).

- Location in La Rioja Location in Spain
- Coordinates: 42°25′26″N 2°48′03″W
- Country: Spain
- Autonomous community: La Rioja
- Comarca: Nájera

Government
  - Alcalde: Ernesto Álvarez Fernández (PP)

Area
  - Total: 11.84 km^{2} (4.57 sq mi)
- Elevation: 559 m (1,834 ft)

Population (2025-01-01)
  - Total: 188
  - Density: 15.9/km^{2} (41.1/sq mi)
- Time zone: UTC+1 (CET)
  - Summer (DST): UTC+2 (CET)
- Website: http://www.azofra.org/
- 36 km to Logroño

Azofra is a municipality in the Autonomous Community of La Rioja, Spain.

== Etymology ==
The name Azofra appeared in 1199, in a papal bull that conceded privileges to the Monastery of San Millán de la Cogolla. According to Asín, it derives from the Arabic as-suxra, "the tribute", that would record the form in which someone obtained property or the function discharged.
