= Algarrobo =

Algarrobo may refer to:

== Places ==
- Algarrobo, Chile
- Algarrobo, Magdalena, Colombia
- Algarrobo, Spain
- Algarrobo, Aibonito, Puerto Rico, a barrio
- Algarrobo, Guayama, Puerto Rico, a barrio
- Algarrobo, Vega Baja, Puerto Rico, a barrio
- Algarrobo, Yauco, Puerto Rico, a barrio

== Plants ==
- Ceratonia siliqua, the European carob tree
- Prosopis, a genus of flowering plants in South America and elsewhere
- Samanea saman, a flowering tree called algarrobo in Cuba
- Hymenaea, a genus of flowering plants in Colombia and the Americas

== See also ==
- Los Algarrobos (disambiguation)
- Algarrobos, a barrio in the municipality of Mayagüez, Puerto Rico
- El Algarrobo, an iron mine in northern Chile
