= Pico Almenara =

Mountain in Spain

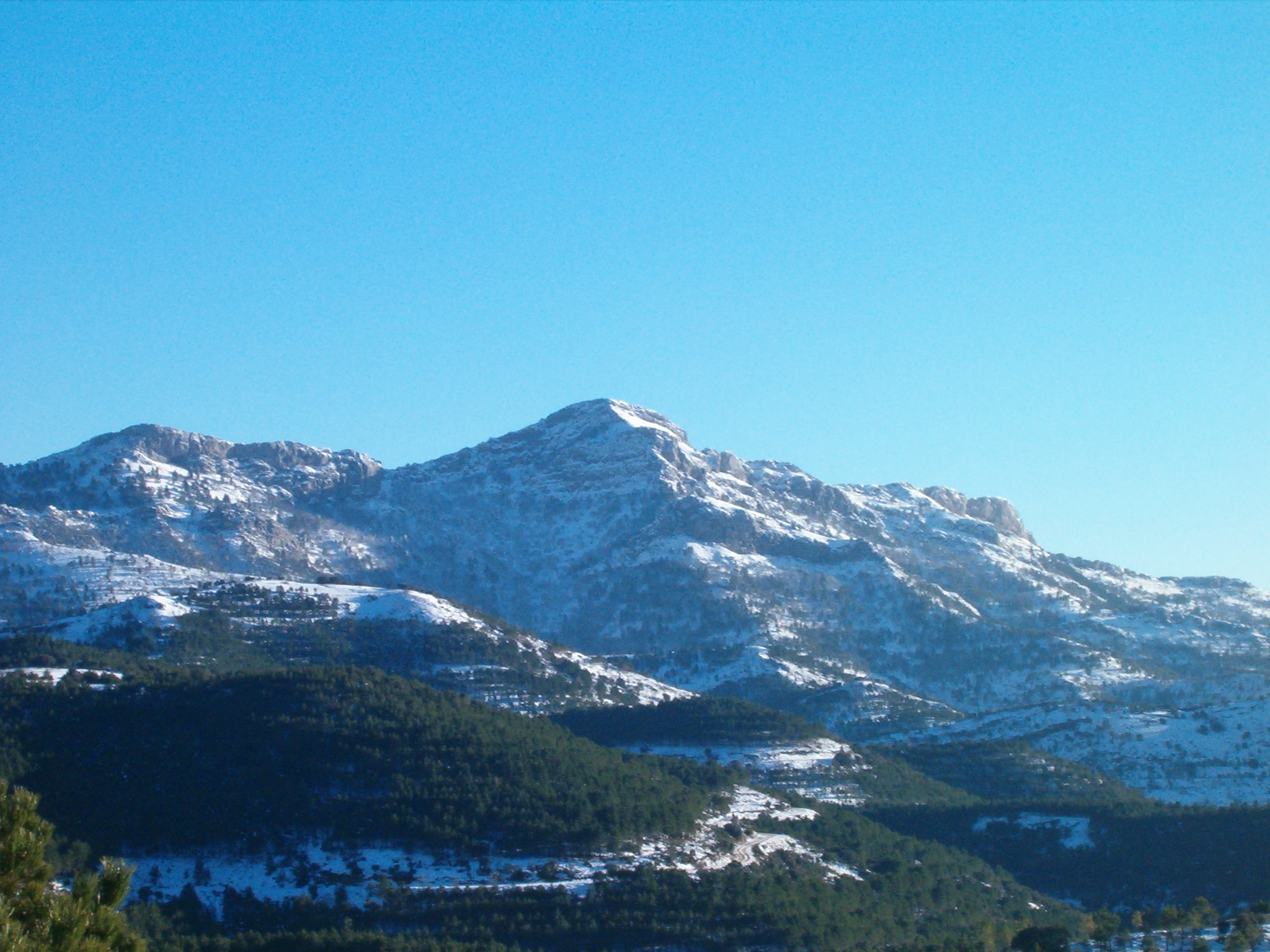
- Winter view of the North face

Highest point
- Elevation: 1,796 m (5,892 ft)
- Prominence: 648 m (2,126 ft)
- Coordinates: 38°37′00″N 02°22′00″W

Geography
- Location within Spain
- Location: Albacete Province, Castile-La Mancha
- Parent range: Sierra de Alcaraz

Climbing
- First ascent: ancestral
- Easiest route: hike

Pico Almenara is a 1796 m (5893.4 ft.) high mountain in Spain.

== Geography ==
The mountain is located in Albacete Province, in the southern part of the autonomous community of Castile–La Mancha. It's the highest peak of the Sierra de Alcaraz, and is visible from a large part of the province.

== Access to the summit ==
The summit can be accessed by hiking trails on the different faces of the mountain. From 1000 to 1600 metres above sea level they mainly go through pine woods while the last part of the hikes walk through open terrain.

== See also ==
- Baetic System
