= Borghetto =

Borghetto (the diminutive of borgo) is a common Italian place name:

- Borghetto d'Arroscia, a commune (Italian comune) in the province of Imperia
- Borghetto di Borbera, a commune in the province of Alessandria
- Borghetto di Vara, a commune in the province of La Spezia
- Borghetto Lodigiano, a commune in the province of Lodi
- Borghetto Santo Spirito, a commune in the province of Savona
- Borghetto San Nicolò, a former commune in the province of Imperia
- Borghetto, a frazione of the commune of Valeggio sul Mincio in the province of Verona
- Borghetto, a frazione of the commune of Tuoro sul Trasimeno in the province of Perugia
- Borghetto, a frazione of the commune of Piacenza in the province of Piacenza
- Borghetto, a frazione of the commune of San Martino di Lupari in the province of Padua
- Borghetto, a frazione of the commune of Mozzo in the province of Bergamo
- Borghetto, a frazione of the commune of Avio, in the province of Trento
- Borghetto, farmstead of Garbagna Novarese, in the province of Novara
