= Sierra de Alcaraz =

Mountain range in Albacete Province, southeast Spain

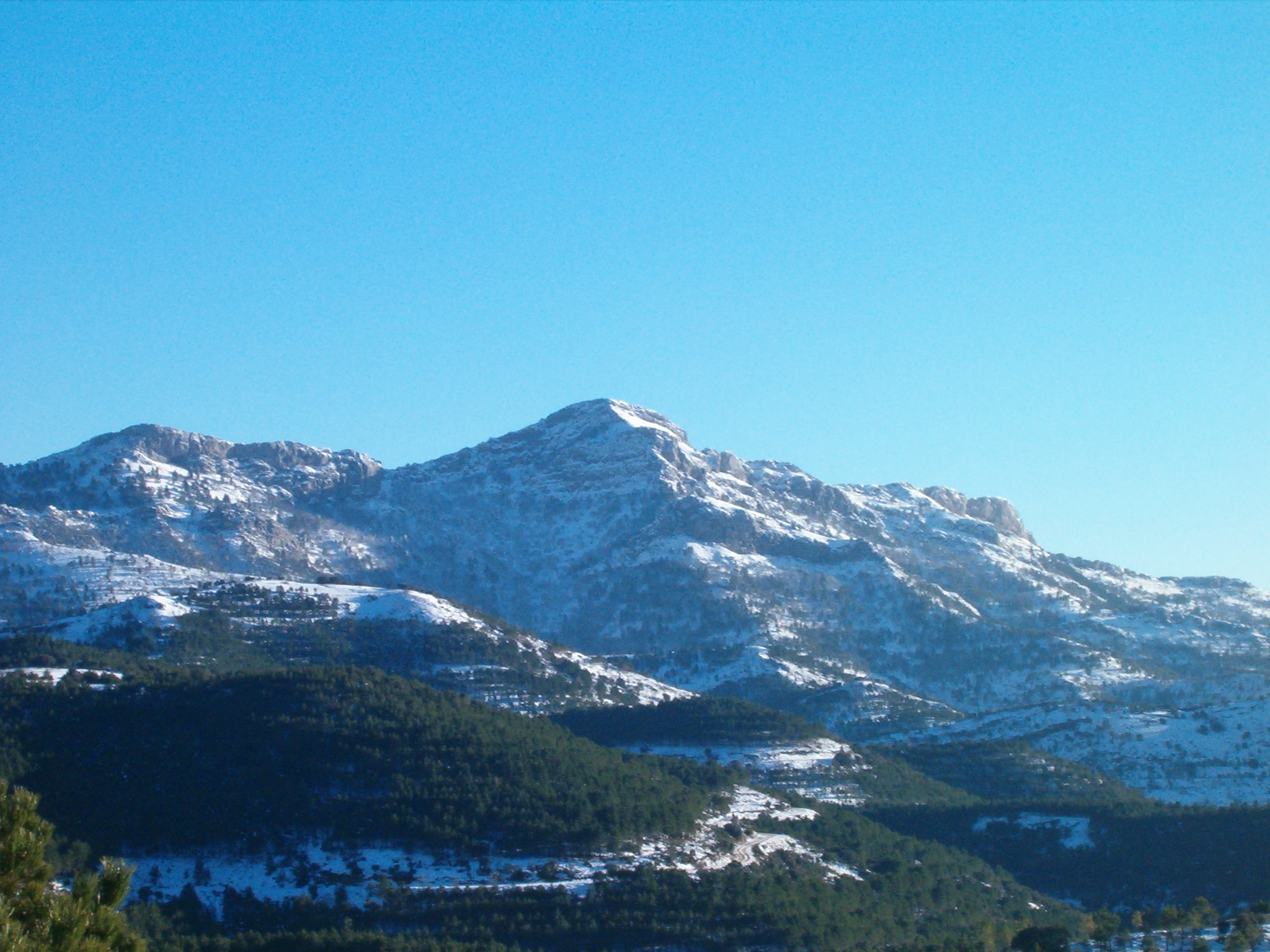
- View of Pico Almenara

Highest point
- Peak: Pico Almenara
- Elevation: 1,796 m (5,892 ft)
- Coordinates: 38°37′N 02°22′W

Geography
- Location within Spain
- Location: Albacete Province, Castile-La Mancha
- Country: Spain
- Parent range: Prebaetic System

Geology
- Mountain type: Limestone

The Sierra de Alcaraz is a mountain range of the Cordillera Prebética located in Albacete Province, southeast Spain. Its highest peak is the Pico Almenara with an elevation of 1,796 m.

== See also ==
- Baetic System
