= Almenara de Adaja =

Coordinates: 41°13′N 4°40′W

Almenara de Adaja, Spain
- Interactive map of Almenara de Adaja, Spain
- Country: Spain
- Autonomous community: Castile and León
- Province: Valladolid
- Municipality: Almenara de Adaja

Area
  - Total: 17.16 km^{2} (6.63 sq mi)
- Elevation: 773 m (2,536 ft)

Population (2025-01-01)
  - Total: 24
  - Density: 1.4/km^{2} (3.6/sq mi)
- Time zone: UTC+1 (CET)
  - Summer (DST): UTC+2 (CEST)

Almenara de Adaja is a municipality located in the province of Valladolid, Castile and León, Spain. According to the 2004 census (INE), the municipality had a population of 37 inhabitants.

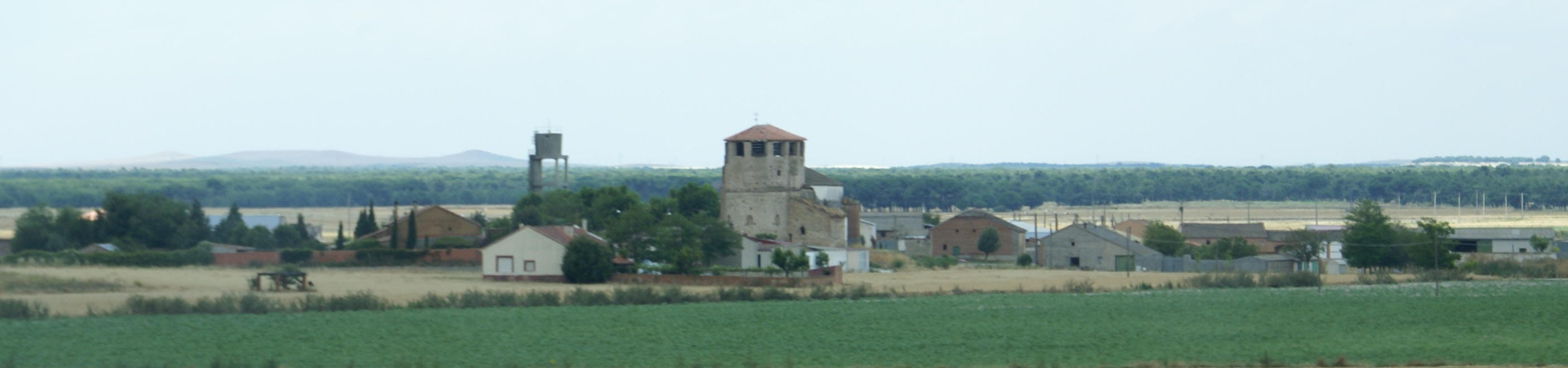
Paronamic view of this small town.
