= Los Algarrobos =

Los Algarrobos may refer to:

- Los Algarrobos, Chiriquí, Panama
- Los Algarrobos, Veraguas, Panama
