= Mazraa =

Mazraa or Mazra'a may refer to:

== Places ==
=== Syria ===
- Al-Mazraa, Suwayda, a town in the Al-Suwayda Governorate
- Al-Mazraa, Homs, a village in Homs District, Homs Governorate
- Al-Mazraah, a village in Talkalakh District, Homs Governorate

=== Lebanon ===
- Corniche el Mazraa, Street in Beirut
- Mazraat Meshref, a town in Tyre district
- Mazraat El Chouf, a town and area in Chouf District
- Mazraa, Beirut, a commercial district in Beirut
- Mazraat Al Toufah, a village in Zgharta District
- Mazraat En Nahr, a village in Zgharta District

=== Israel ===
- Mazra'a, a local council in the western Galilee
- el-Mazra'a, or Mizra, ancient site in the Jezreel Valley also called Hirbat el Mizra
- Khirbet el Mazra'a, locality in the Upper Galilee now Zar'it

=== Palestine ===
- Al-Mazra'a ash-Sharqiya, a town near Ramallah
- Al-Mazra'a al-Qibliya, a village, now part of Al-Zaitounah town in the Ramallah and al-Bireh Governorate
- Al-Muzayri'a, a village in the Ramle Subdistrict

== Other ==
- Battle of al-Mazraa
