= Cuarte de Huerva =

- municipality
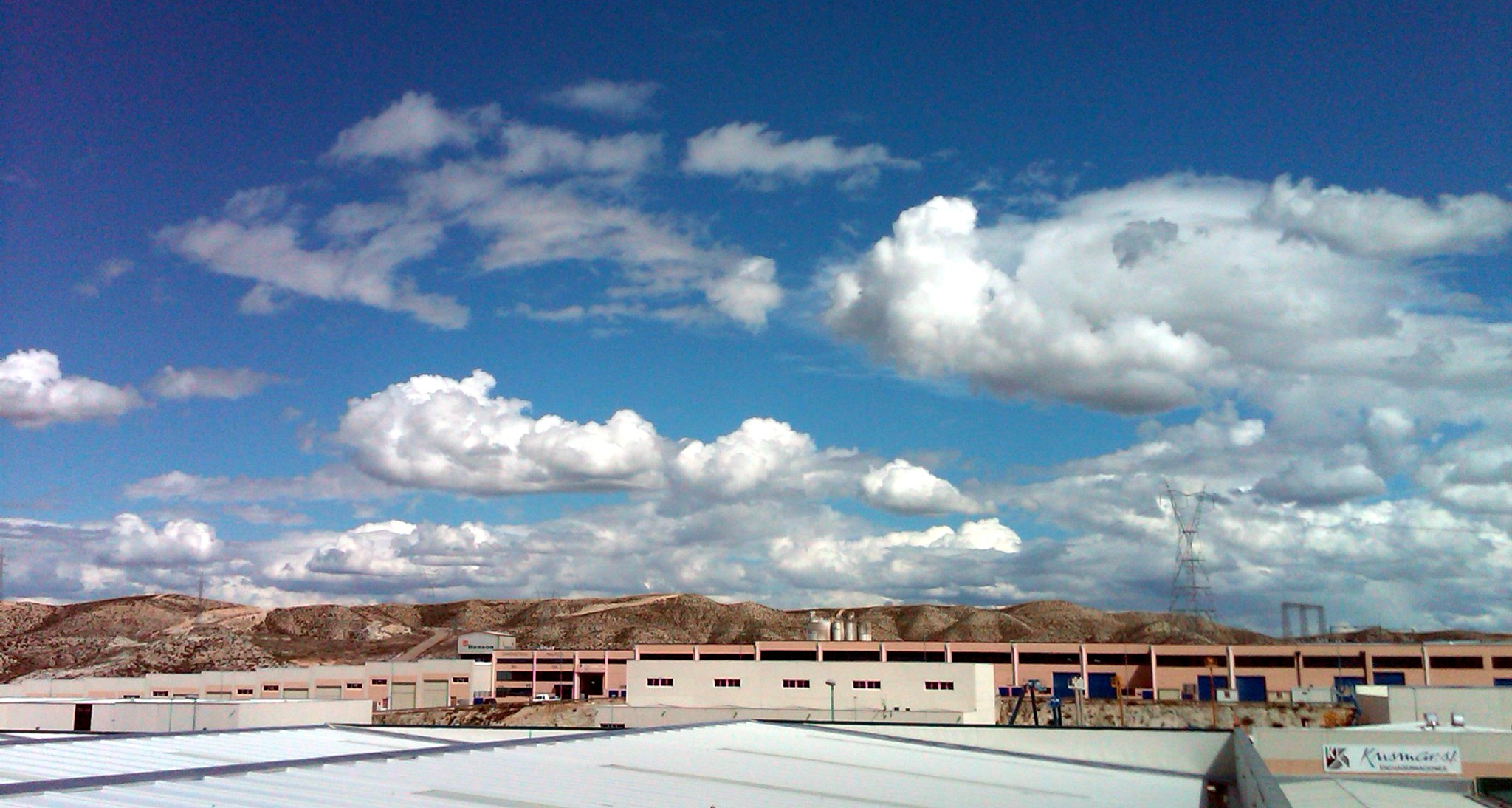
- View of Cuarte de Huerva

- Coat of arms

- Location within Aragon Location within Spain Location within Europe
- Country: Spain
- Autonomous community: Aragon
- Province: Zaragoza
- Comarca: Zaragoza

Government
  - Type: Mayor–council
  - Body: Ayuntamiento de Cuarte de Huerva
  - Mayor: Jesús Pérez Pérez (Aragonese Party)

Area
  - Total: 8 km^{2} (3.1 sq mi)

Population (2025-01-01)
  - Total: 15,408
  - Density: 1,900/km^{2} (5,000/sq mi)
- Time zone: UTC+1 (CET)
  - Summer (DST): UTC+2 (CEST)

Cuarte de Huerva is a municipality located in the province of Zaragoza, Aragon, Spain. According to the 2013 census the municipality has a population of 11,043 inhabitants.

It is named after the Huerva River.

== See also ==
- Zaragoza Comarca
- List of municipalities in Zaragoza
