= María de Huerva =

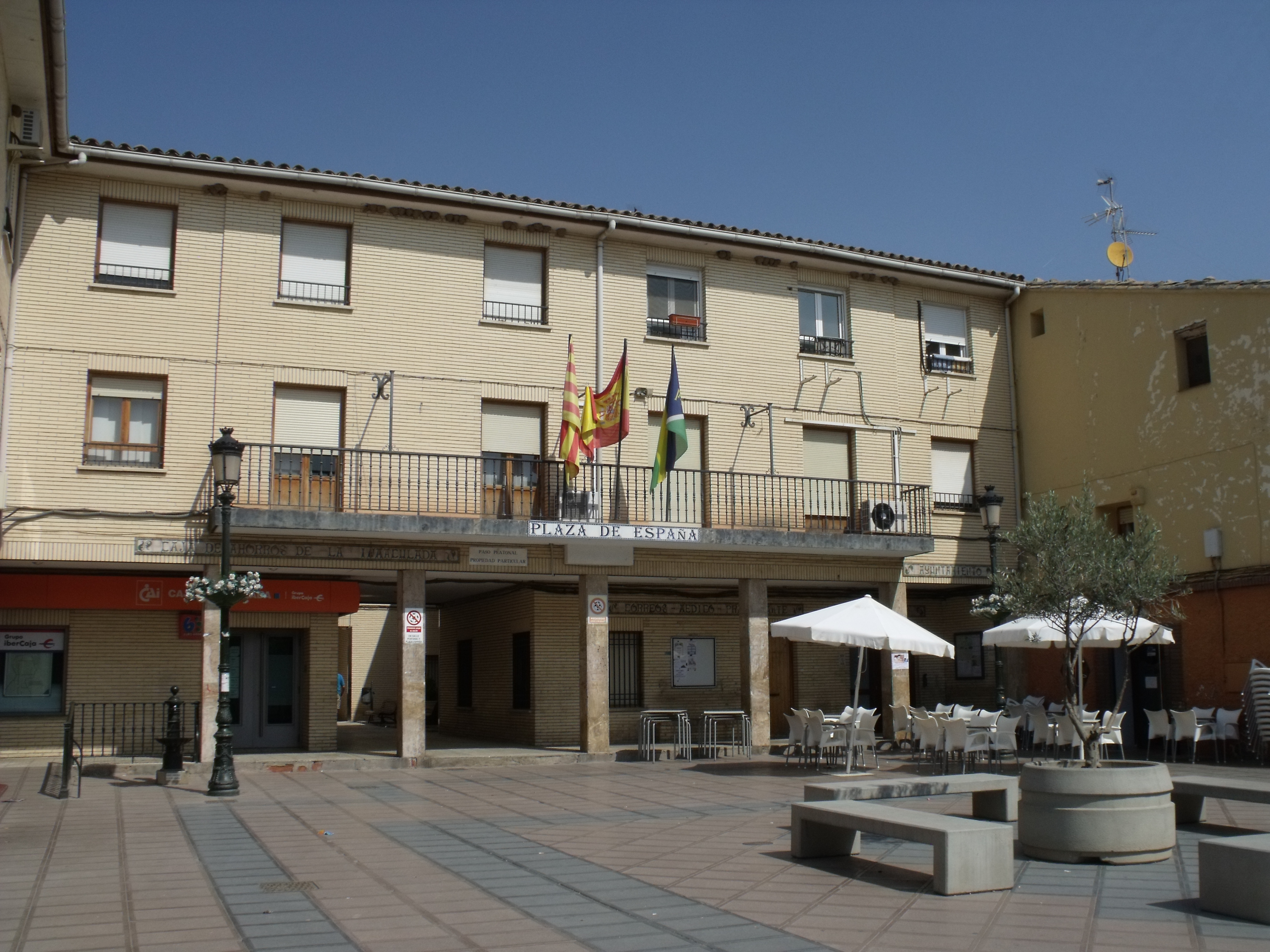
- Town hall

- Flag Coat of arms

- Location within Spain
- Coordinates: 41°32′N 1°00′W
- Country: Spain
- Autonomous community: Aragon
- Province: Zaragoza
- Municipality: María de Huerva

Area
  - Total: 108 km^{2} (42 sq mi)

Population (2025-01-01)
  - Total: 6,558
  - Density: 60.7/km^{2} (157/sq mi)
- Time zone: UTC+1 (CET)
  - Summer (DST): UTC+2 (CEST)

María de Huerva is a municipality located in the province of Zaragoza, Aragon, Spain. According to the 2004 census the municipality has a population of 2,125 inhabitants.

María de Huerva is named after the Huerva River.

== See also ==
- Zaragoza Comarca
- List of municipalities in Zaragoza
