= Abu al-Hasan al-Balnubi =

Egyptian poet

- Born: Villanova, Emirate of Sicily
- Died: 1100s Cairo, Egyptian Fatimid Caliphate
- Citizenship: Emirate of Sicily; Egyptian Fatimid Caliphate
- Occupations: Poet, teacher, writer

Abu al-Hasan Ali bin Abd al-Rahman bin Abi al-Bashaer al-Siqilli (Egyptian Arabic: أبو الحسن علي بن عبد الرحمن بن أبي البشائر الصِّقلي), also known as Ibn Abi al-Bishr al-Siqilli (ابن أبي البشر الصقلي), was an Egyptian Arab Sicilian poet of the eleventh century AD / fifth AH, who lived most of his life in Fatimid Egypt.

== Biography ==
The dates of his birth and death are unknown. He was known as al-Balnubi because he came from Villanova (Ballanûbah in Arabic) in western Sicily. He migrated to Fatimid Egypt after the Norman conquest of Sicily.

In Alexandria, he taught grammar and language to Abu Muhammad Abdullah bin Yahya bin Hammoud al-Khuraimi, Ali bin al-Hassan bin Youssef al-Damrawi, and Omar bin Issa al-Soussi. Among those who narrated his poetry were Abu al-Hasan al-Jayzi, and Abu al-Raja’ Bashir ibn al-Mubasher ibn Fatak al-Masri.

He wrote poetry in praise of Abu Muhammad al-Yazuri, who was vizier to the Caliph Al-Mustansir Billah from Muharram 442/June 1050 to Muharram 450/March 1058.

Al-Balnoubi used to move between Alexandria and Cairo, and he earned his living by praising emirs and elders, and by doing some teaching.

The year of his death, like his birth, is unclear, and he may have been alive until the last third of the fifth century AH.

== Literature ==
Although he came from the Maghreb, he often imitated the poetic styles of the Mashriq and Omar Farroukh noted his “eloquence and beauty, despite the weakness of his style at times. He did not mention Sicily in his poetry. Rather, he had many characteristics of Egyptian poets in the Fatimid era, which indicates that most of his poetry originated in Egypt." The poetic forms he used included praise poems, satire, lamentation, descriptive pieces and ghazals.

Imad al-Din al-Isfahani mentioned Balnubi’s collection of poetry, of which he said: “I read completely free-form poetry, more than ruby and pearl, attributed to Abu al-Hassan bin Abi al-Bishr.” A collection of his poetry's was edited by Hilal Naji and published in 1976.
