= ARCOS LLC =

American software company

- Type: Private company
- Industry: Software
- Headquarters: Columbus, Ohio, United States
- Key people: Mitchell McLeod (chairman and founder), Paul Bernard (President and CEO)
- Number of employees: Does not disclose
- Website: www.arcos-inc.com

ARCOS is an American software company based in Columbus, Ohio. The company produces automated crew callout and a resource management software system for electric and gas utility companies.

The ARCOS System is a software-as-a-service subscription.

== History ==
ARCOS, an acronym for Automated Roster Call Out System, evolved from a company launched by Mitchell McLeod in 1993 called McLeod & Associates. In 1997, Alliant Energy Corp. asked McLeod to streamline the utility company’s callout system, which McLeod accomplished. Other U.S. utility companies asked for the same automated callout system, and McLeod focused his business on developing automated callout systems. McLeod spun off this business line in 2005, creating ARCOS.

On November 11, 2013, Corum Group announced that ARCOS obtained a strategic investment from the Riverside Company to allow it to expand operations and staff. At the time of The Riverside Company's investment, ARCOS, Inc. changed its name to ARCOS LLC.

In 2011, Salt River Project, the third-largest U.S. public power utility, became the first company to put in place a smartphone automated callout application made by ARCOS.

== Product ==
The order in which each lineman is called out for work after business hours is often stipulated by workplace rules and union agreements. Electric utility companies as well as gas and nuclear utilities use automated callout systems to reduce the time it takes to assemble a crew for power restoration work.
