= Algarrobina =

Syrup in Peruvian cuisine

Algarrobina is a syrup made from the Black Carob tree. It is popular in Peruvian cuisine and can be used in smoothies, cocktails, or simply in milk. Black Carob is a tree indigenous to Coastal Peru; rich in natural sugars, vitamins and minerals, it's a good substitute for chocolate. It can also be found in health food stores in the U.S.

Although its common name is black carob, Prosopis pallida is a South American native tree, unrelated to the traditional Mediterranean carob Ceratonia siliqua, which was introduced to Peru by Spanish settlers. There are similar South American tree species commonly called carob, e.g., Prosopis alba (white carob), but only the pods of Prosopis pallida (black carob) are used in making algarrobina.
