= Zuera =

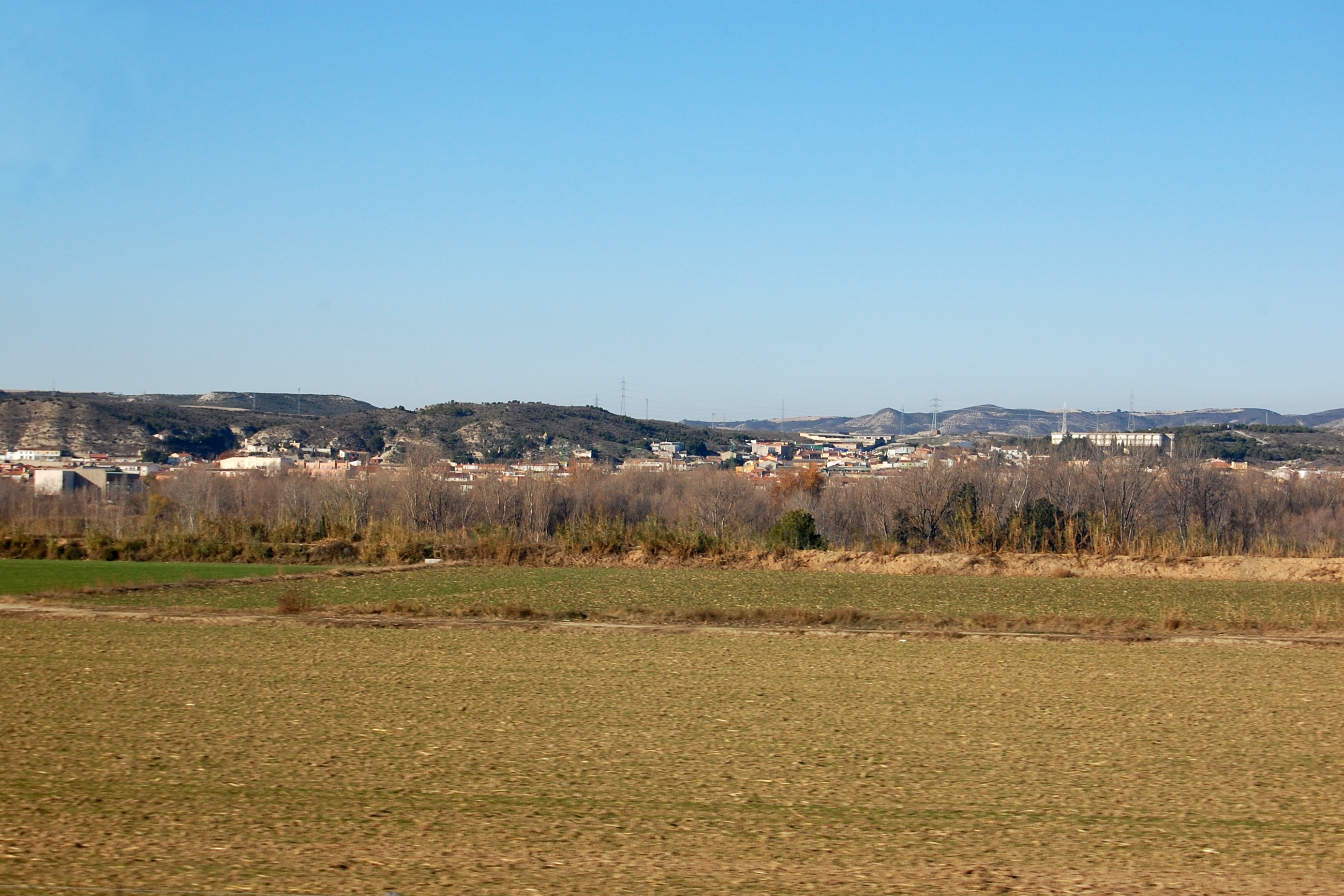

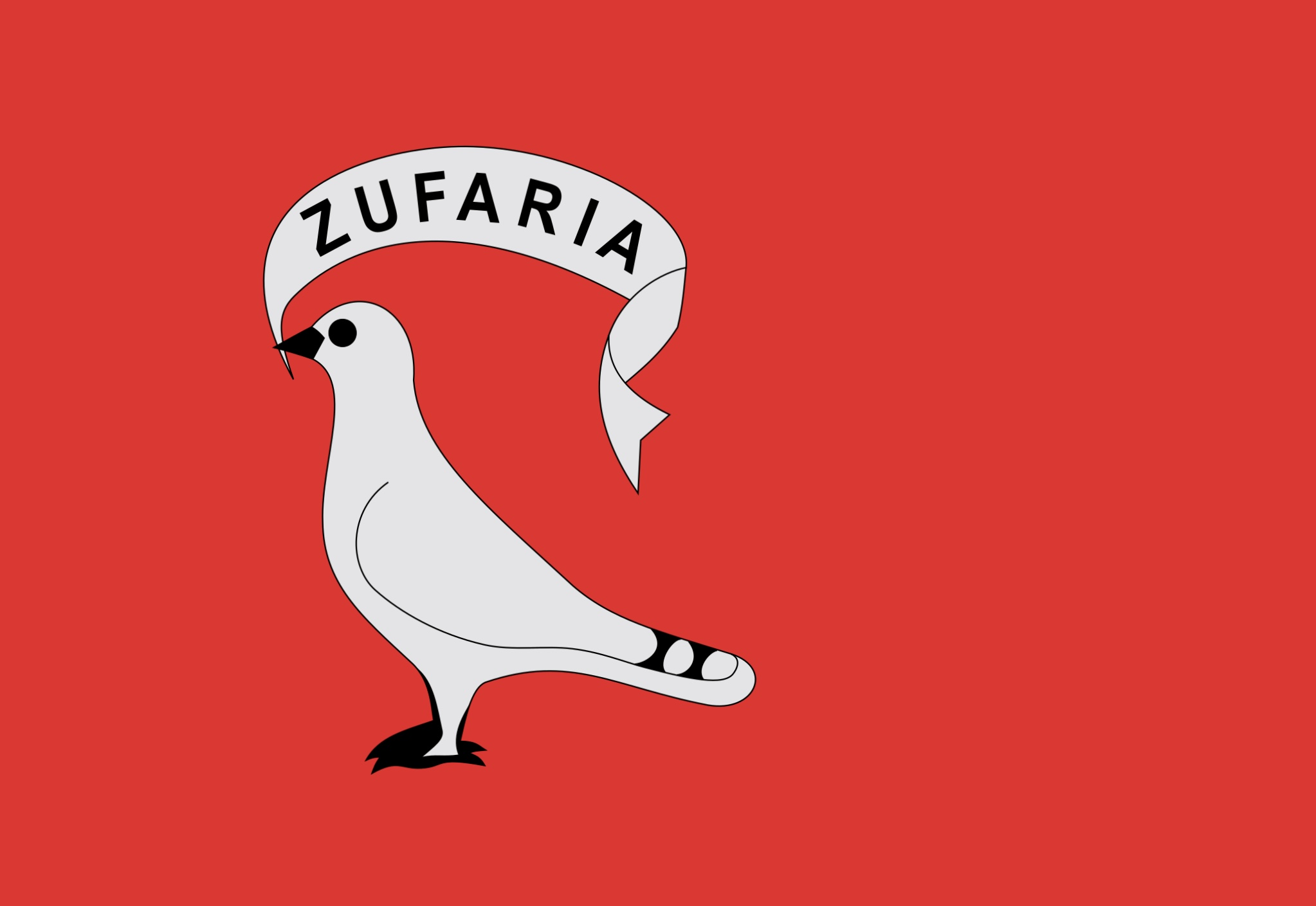
- Flag Coat of arms

- Location within Aragon Location within Spain Location within Europe
- Coordinates: 41°52′N 0°47′W
- Country: Spain
- Autonomous community: Aragon
- Province: Zaragoza
- Comarca: Zaragoza Comarca

Area
  - Total: 369 km^{2} (142 sq mi)
- Elevation: 280 m (920 ft)

Population (2025-01-01)
  - Total: 8,766
- Time zone: UTC+1 (CET)
  - Summer (DST): UTC+2 (CEST)

Zuera is a municipality located in the province of Zaragoza, Aragon, Spain. According to the 2010 census, the municipality has a population of 7,510 inhabitants.

Zuera's geographical location in the Zaragoza Comarca and its proximity to the city of Zaragoza have shaped the historical development of the town from its beginnings until today. Urban settlements in the municipality of Zuera are located right on the banks of the Gállego River. They follow a longitudinal axis along which (continuing the transportation and communication schemes established by the ancient Romans) the N-123 national highway, the Madrid-Barcelona and Zaragoza-France trains, as well as high-voltage power lines are located.

== See also ==
- Zaragoza Comarca
- List of municipalities in Zaragoza
