= Alovera =

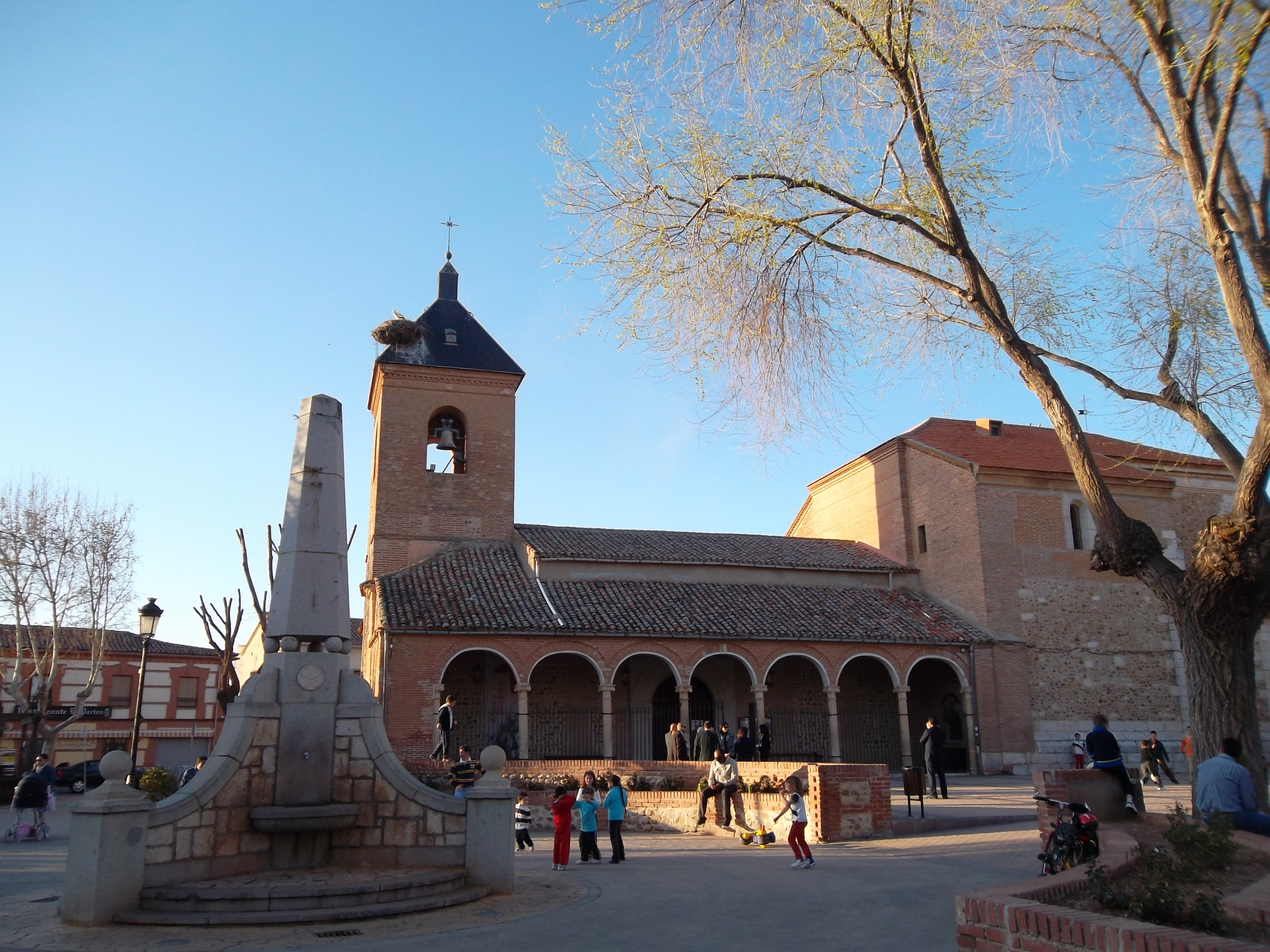

- Flag Coat of arms

- Location within Province of Guadalajara Location within Castilla-La Mancha Location within Spain
- Coordinates: 40°35′48″N 3°14′53″W
- Country: Spain
- Autonomous community: Castile-La Mancha
- Province: Guadalajara
- Municipality: Alovera

Area
  - Total: 13.65 km^{2} (5.27 sq mi)

Population (2025-01-01)
  - Total: 14,526
  - Density: 1,064/km^{2} (2,756/sq mi)
- Time zone: UTC+1 (CET)
  - Summer (DST): UTC+2 (CEST)

Alovera is a municipality located in the province of Guadalajara, Castile-La Mancha, Spain. According to the 2015 census (INE), the municipality has a population of 12,247 inhabitants.

== History ==
Since the discovery of a Roman cupae (a tomb) in 1999 in the restoration of the St. Michael´s Church, we know there was a Roman settlement in Alovera. This cupae was dated in the 1st or 2nd century. Juan Manuel Abascal and Armin Stylow, from Universidad de Alcalá, concluded that the text written on the cupae was "(monument to) Pompeyo Fusco, 60 years old. It was commissioned by his wife Antonia Melusa". Apart from the cupae, it is thought that one of the column bases of the St. Michael´s Church belonged to the peristyle of a Roman villa.

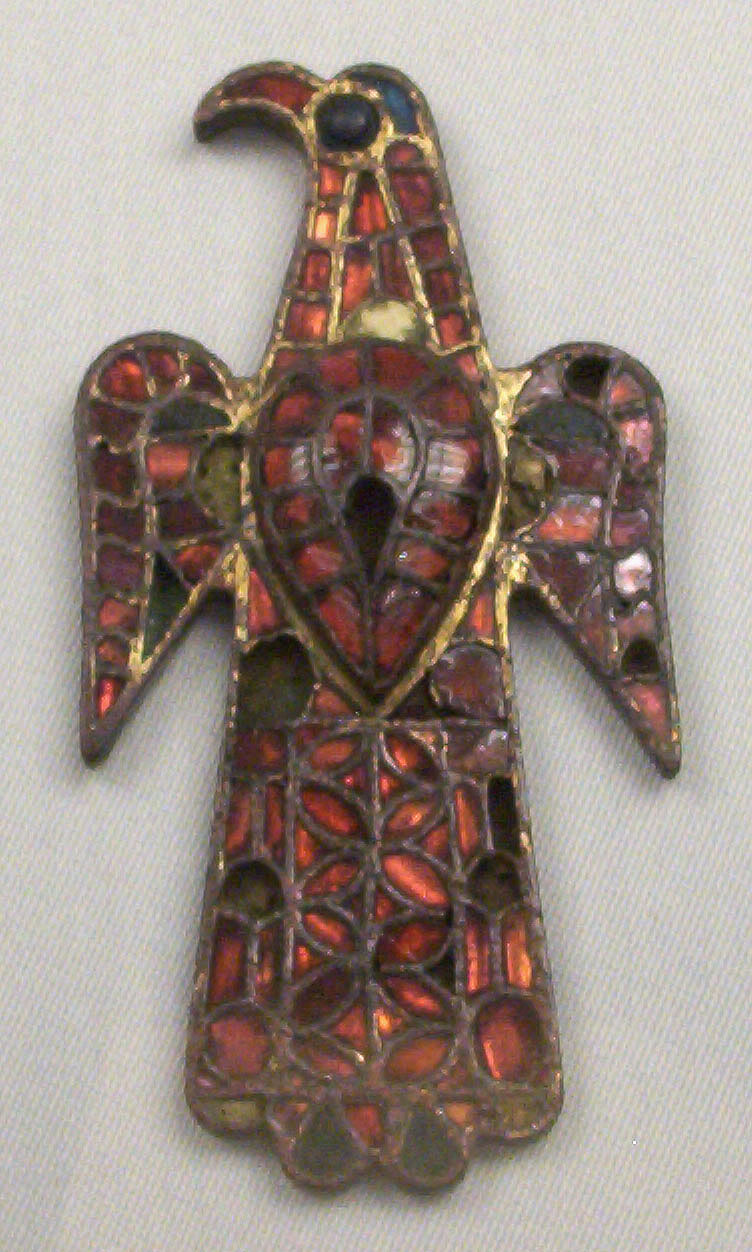
One of the two Visigothic cloisonné fibulae discovered in Alovera

We also know there was a Visigothic settlement in Alovera thanks to a couple of brooches which are on display at Museo Arquelógico Nacional in Madrid. This brooches, known as fibulas, were made in the 6th century using the cloisonné technique.

The first documents to mention Alovera were written in the 16th century. By then, Alovera was a farmer settlement which lands belonged to the monasteries of St. Bartholomew of Lupiana, St. Clair and St. Bernard.

In the 16th century, St. Michael´s Church was built by master Nicolás de Ribero helped by Juan de Buerga and Juan Ballesteros. In 1690 finished the construction. The church is composed of three naves, a bell tower and an atrium. The main altarpiece was built in the 17th century by Juan, Pedro and Francisco González, followers of classical manichaeism. Also, there are a St. Gregory altarpiece made by the disciples of Juan de Borgoña and Juan Correa de Vivar and, in the sacristy, a Pieta painting by Willem Key.

In 1626, Felipe II gives to Alovera the title of villa. Then, the Villahermosa de Alovera was sold to Lorenza de Sotomayor, marquess of Alovera. Nowadays, there is still a marquess of Alovera.
