= Gamesa G128-4.5 MW =

The Gamesa G128-4.5 MW wind turbine, from Gamesa, near Jaulín, Zaragoza, Spain, is a wind turbine with the largest rotor, which surpasses with 128 metres (420 ft) that of the Enercon E-126 by 2 metres (6 ft 7 in). It is the prototype of this model. The rotor is fixed on an 81,-120,-or-140-metre (266, 394, or 459 ft) tall tower consisting of concrete and steel. The turbine has a generation power of 4.5 MW.
