= Puebla de Almenara =

- municipality
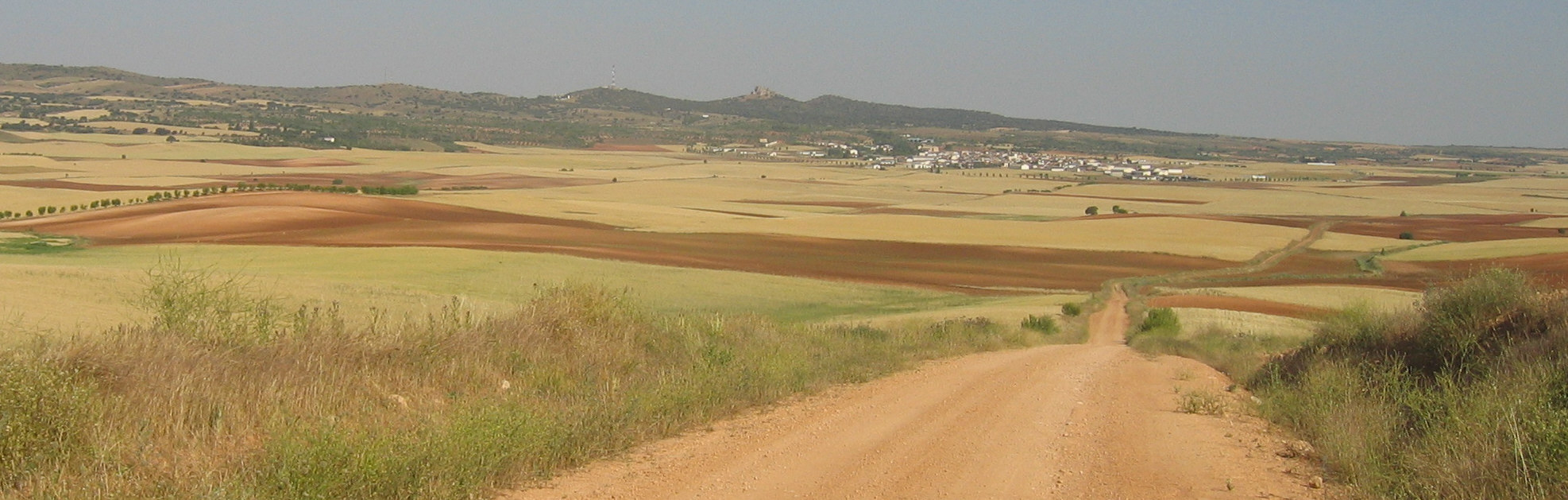

- Flag Coat of arms

- Location within Spain Location within Castilla-La Mancha
- Coordinates: 39°47′N 2°48′W
- Country: Spain
- Autonomous community: Castile-La Mancha
- Province: Cuenca
- Municipality: Puebla de Almenara

Area
  - Total: 37.72 km^{2} (14.56 sq mi)

Population (2025-01-01)
  - Total: 294
  - Density: 7.79/km^{2} (20.2/sq mi)
- Time zone: UTC+1 (CET)
  - Summer (DST): UTC+2 (CEST)

Puebla de Almenara is a municipality located in the province of Cuenca, Castile-La Mancha, Spain. According to the 2009 census (INE), the municipality has a population of 474 inhabitants.
