= Cadrete =

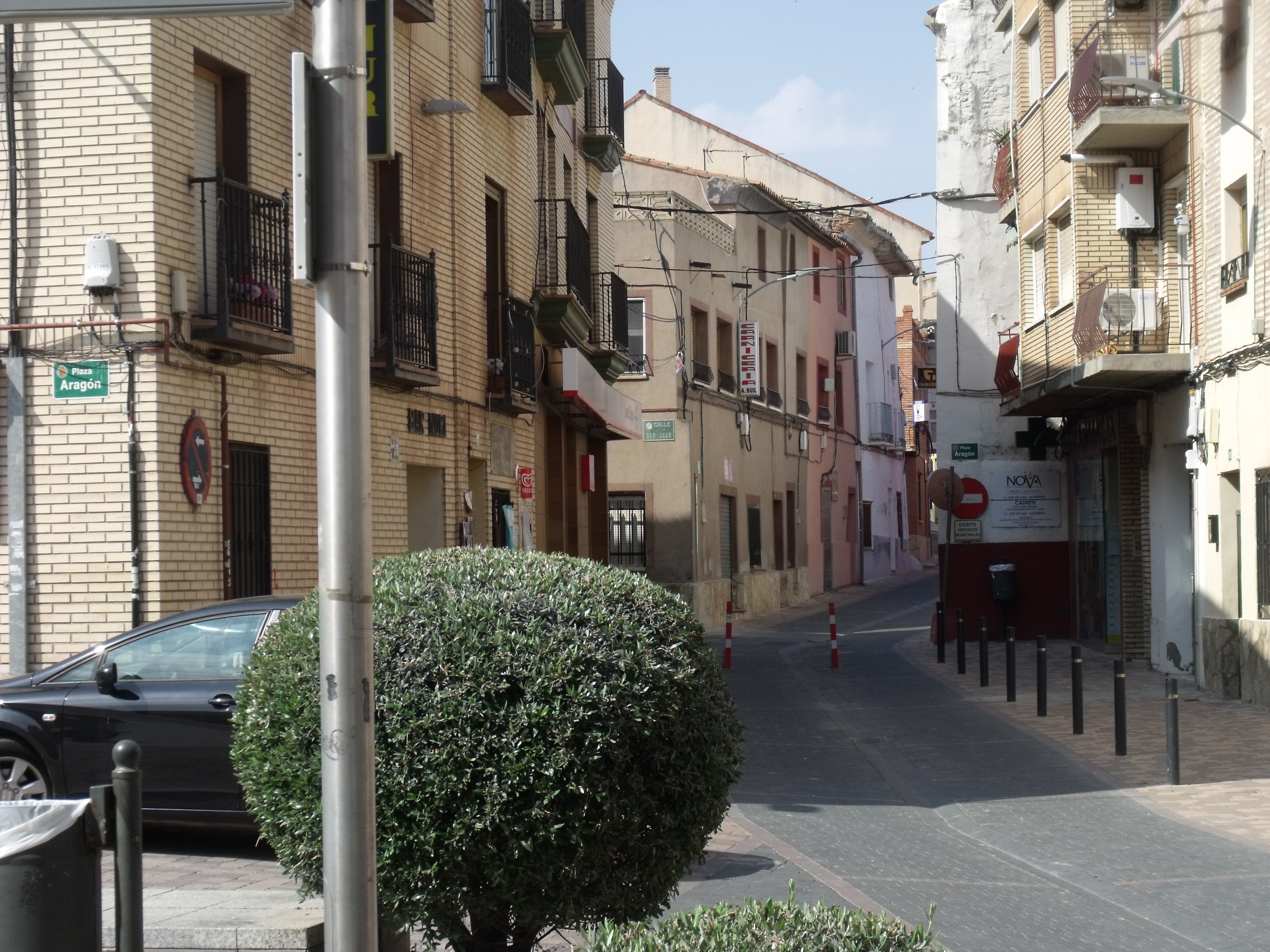

- Flag Coat of arms

- Location within Aragon Location within Spain Location within Europe
- Country: Spain
- Autonomous community: Aragon
- Province: Zaragoza

Area
  - Total: 8 km^{2} (3.1 sq mi)

Population (2025-01-01)
  - Total: 4,688
  - Density: 590/km^{2} (1,500/sq mi)
- Time zone: UTC+1 (CET)
  - Summer (DST): UTC+2 (CEST)

Cadrete is a small town in north-east Spain, close to Zaragoza. It is notable for its Muslim castle, Mudejar Church and famous Cardoons. More recently, a massive wind-turbine has been installed less than 300 metres from the village, producing several landscape damages and high noise rates for the town's inhabitants.

== History ==
Cadrete (Qadrit in Arabic) was founded as a Moorish settlement within Al-Andalus. The Moors built a fortress on top of a steep hill around which the medieval town developed. The old mosque was later converted into a Moorish-style church during the period of the Reconquest.

== See also ==
- List of municipalities in Zaragoza
