= Entrena =

- Municipality
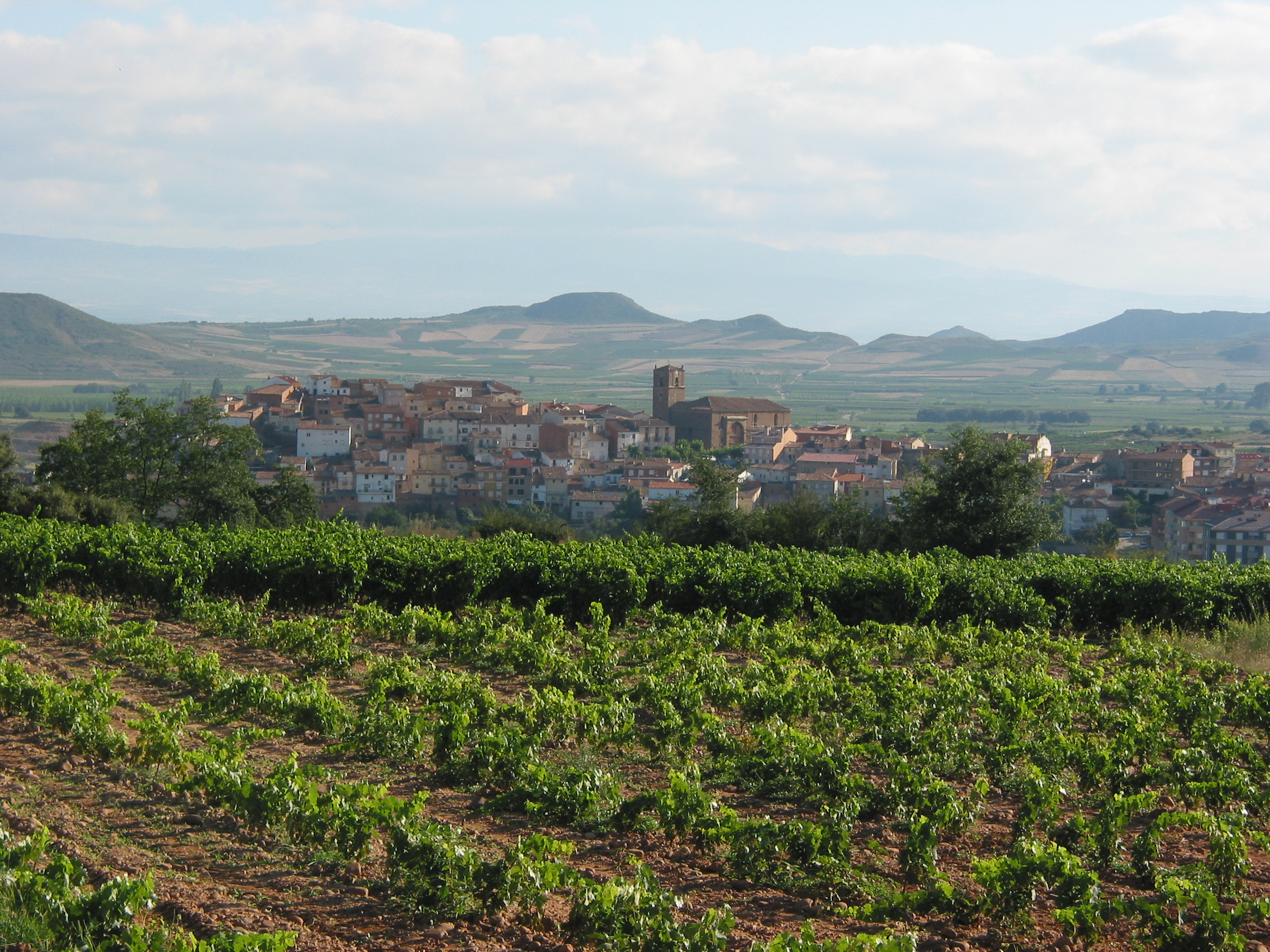
- View of Entrena. At foreground its vineyards

- Flag Coat of arms

- Location within Rioja Media (La Rioja).
- Coordinates: 42°23′N 2°32′W
- Country: Spain
- Autonomous community: La Rioja
- Comarca: Rioja Media

Government
  - Mayor: Esteban Pérez Díez (PP)

Area
  - Total: 21.03 km^{2} (8.12 sq mi)
- Elevation: 559 m (1,834 ft)

Population (2025-01-01)
  - Total: 1,660
  - Density: 78.9/km^{2} (204/sq mi)
- Time zone: UTC+1 (CET)
  - Summer (DST): UTC+2 (CET)
- Website: http://www.entrena.org
- 12 km to Logroño

Entrena is a municipality of La Rioja, Spain, located near the capital Logroño. Its population in January 2010 was 1,503 over an area of 21.03 square kilometres. The nucleus is placed at an altitude of 558 metres. It is bordered by Navarrete and Lardero to the north; Albelda de Iregua to the east; Nalda, Sorzano and Sojuela to the south; and Medrano to the west.

== Geography ==
The relief of the municipality is level, its altitude varies between the 500 and the 600 M.s. Most of the land are in a glacis, old channel of Iregua River. In the South zone are the first spurs of the Mountain range of Moncalvillo. The village is located in this zone, on the hill called El Conjuro. Is urbanized in bastille with his streets staggered and concentric. The residential zone extends from the slope south until the adjacent plain, whereas in the slope north, fresher, situates the Neighbourhood of Las Bodegas.

The rivers are few and with great low water. Hardly precipices coming from the mountain range cross the term from the South to North, like Ruicidera or Río Daroca.

Northwest: Navarrete	North: Navarrete	Northeast: Lardero
West: Medrano		East: Albelda de Iregua
Southwest: Sojuela	South: Sorzano	Southeast: Nalda

== History ==
The zone was populated by Romans, as it indicates the Roman town of La Dehesa, in addition to the road of Zaragoza-Briviesca that crossed the municipality.

Alfonso I of Asturias the Catholic in the middle of 8th century reconquered the villa from the Muslims. According to the Geographic Dictionary, published in Barcelona in 1830, Entrena would be founded by this king around 750, but already it is known by the Chronicle of Alfonso III that these incursions realised by this king did not suppose the foundation of villages. These expeditions, carried out along with their brother Froila, consisted of killing the Muslims they found and gathering Christians to take them to the mountains.

In 1044, Entrena appears documented under the romance name Antelena.

From 1076, it belongs to Castile and to its king Alfonso VI. This king, before the strategic value of the zone, border with the kingdoms of Aragón and Navarre, populated and raised diverse fortresses to protect his interests. One of those seats was Entrena.

In 1160 Sancho VI of Navarre "repopulated" the villa.

In certain gifts of king Sancho VI of Navarre it appears with the Latin name of Entidigone.

During the reign of Stephanie of Foix, widow of García Sánchez III of Navarre, was one of the villages favored by the privilege of union and other rights, with Sojuela, Velilla de la Rad, Fuenmayor, Hornos de Moncalvillo, Medrano and Navarrete. These municipalities were known as the Seven Towns of the Country. Later, this queen donated Entrena to the monastery of Santa María la Real of Nájera, appearing named as Antelana.

In 1189 the Benedictine monks of Santa María la Real of Nájera, among others, donated the church of Entrena to the bishopric of Calahorra after lawsuits between the bishop and the monastery, with intervention of the king and the abbot of Cluny.

King Enrique II of Castile donates the town to Juan Ramirez de Arellano by the lent services, according to appears in the concession writing of the Señorío de Cameros. Since then the town would be linked to the Arellano family that would have great disputes with the Gómez Manrique (they were gentlemen of Navarrete by donation realised in 1380 by Juan I of Castile to Diego Gómez Manrique de Lara).

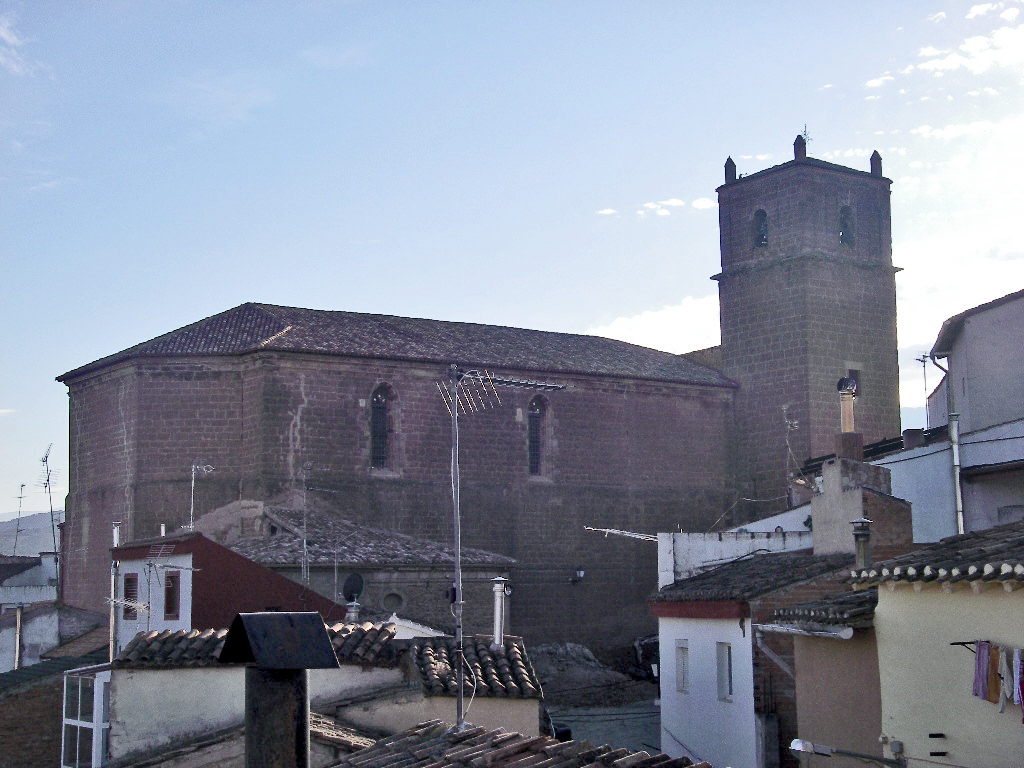
Saint Martin's Church

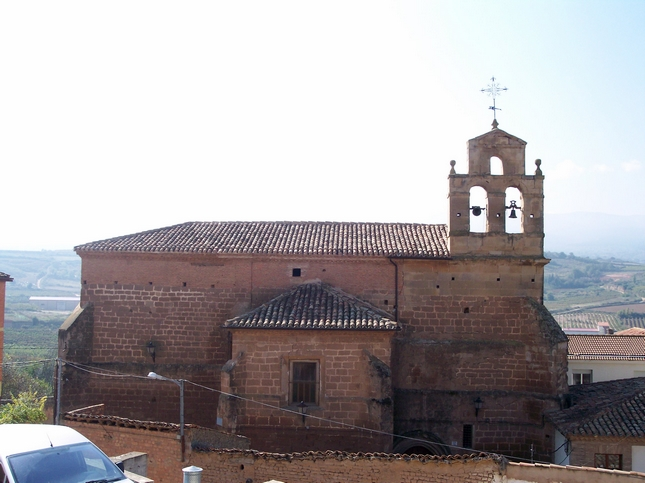
St. Clare's Convent

In 1478 the neighbors of Navarrete destroy fortifications constructed by those of Entrena. In retaliation, people of Clavijo and Lagunilla, that were of Arellano, destroyed the term of Ribafrecha that was affection of Manrique family. Entrena, until the abolition of the señoríos, belonged to the counts of Aguilar, gentlemen of Cameros.

In 1492 the expulsion of the Jews in Spain is carried out by the Catholic Monarchs. At this time the Jewish community in Entrena was important, getting to constitute an aljama, with an approximated population of 50 families. In 1503 Carlos Ramirez de Arellano and his wife, Juana de Zúñiga, gentlemen of Cameros and counts of Aguilar, founded the monastery of Santa Clara in Entrena granting to him in addition the already preexisting Santa Maria de Barrivero. The founding nuns came from Tordesillas and the monastery belonged to the franciscan province of Burgos. The first abbess was a Arellano.

Entrena had a hospital and hostelry to take care of the pilgrims that approached by the French Way to arrive at Compostela as they testify documents of 16th century.

After the disappearance of the señoríos, in 1811, formed part of the province of Soria, until the creation of the province of Logroño on 30 November 1833.

In 1851, according to Pascual Madoz, Entrena had 202 houses, the City council and prison; a convent of monks of Santa Clara, a source of potable water [...] And school for both sexes. His production consisted especially in wheat, barley, beans and wine, in addition to rear of sheep and the hunting of partridges, quails and hares. The industry was based in three mills, that each day go in decadence, and some factories of liquor, that works very little.

According to this census Entrena had a population of 181 neighbours, 780 souls.

=== The Coffer of Mercy ===
In 1571 Francisco de Moreda established an agricultural government social security fund, that it had the objective to distribute cereals, especially wheat, between the poorest farmers. These had to give back the grain loan with a minimum interest. Normally the neighbors of the town benefited from this one, but during first half of the 18th century also they did those of neighboring localities. It was in operation until 1799.

=== Santa Ana Hill ===
It is an archaeological deposit excavated at the end of 1970s and the beginning of the 1980s by Antonio González Blanco and Urbano Espinosa Ruiz.

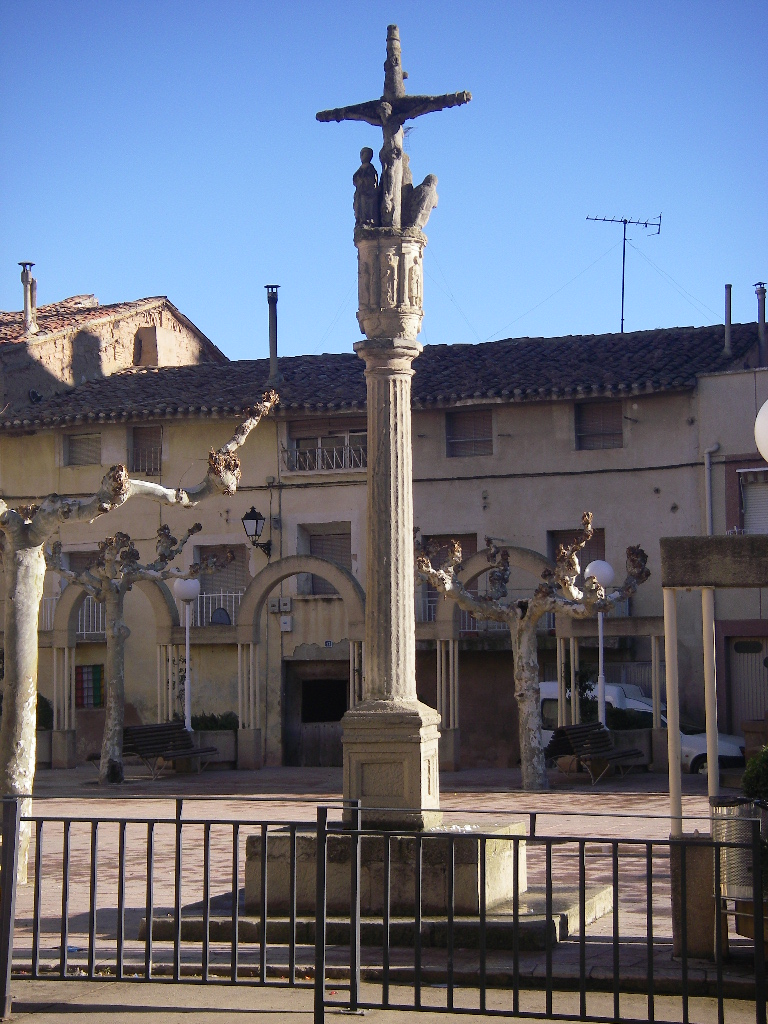
Crucero

The rests found more ancient belong to the hallstatt culture. Treat of two funds of bench-like sheds were recovered abundant material that find in the Museum of La Rioja. These materials consist in polished ceramics, painted, fingered and spatulated. The vessels are generally decorated with high neck and biconic profile. Also highlight several moulds for metallic axes realized in sandstone.

This site was found in the peak of the hill and believe that it was a holy place since they have found ashes and other rests that indicate it. The populated could develop around the sides of the hill but his rests have disappeared because of the crop of these lands.

Also have found rests of back periods, Celtiberians (La Tène culture) and Romans. The location of the settlement was next to the shod that communicated Zaragoza with Briviesca. Of the Roman era have found rests of ceramic, some Roman scales, lids of sarcophagus, low burials knit and a human-like round trail from the early Christian era.

== Communications ==
=== Roads ===
The main road of access is the LR-254 that communicates Entrena with Lardero and Logroño through the N-111. The LR-137 crosses the town from southeast to northwest and link with the roads N-111, N-120 and N-232 joining towns like Nalda, Navarrete and Fuenmayor. The LR-445 communicates Entrena with the neighbouring town of Sojuela and the LR-444 part of the LR-137 from the Hermitage of Santa Ana to Medrano.

== Monuments ==
=== Religious buildings ===
- St. Martin's Church. Constructed in 1545 in ashlar masonry factory. It is a church of a ship of three sections with chapels between abutments, cruise and eight-sided head of three planes. It is covered by vaults with ogives starred of different layouts, and slightly has pointed arcs. Sacristy of three sections is a construction barroca located to the north of the head. The temple has two entrances faced in the second section, the one to the north is a semicircular arch, and that to the south is formed by clasicistas elements, it registers in a triumphal arch. The tower of two bodies is of end of 16th century.

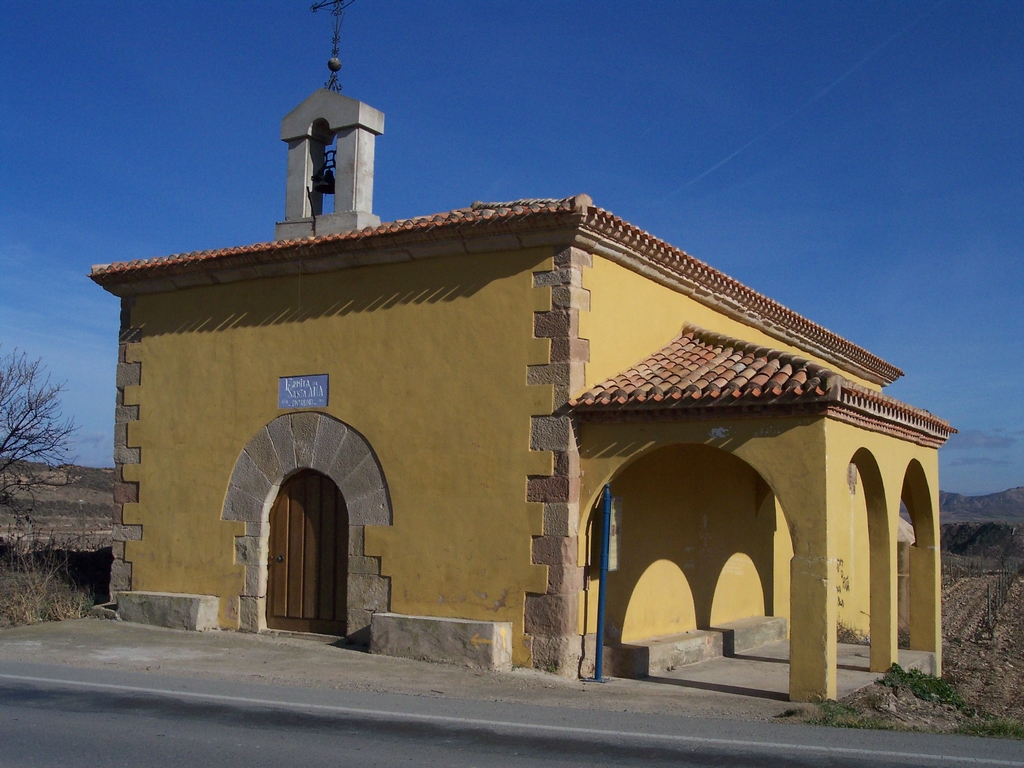
St. Ann's Hermitage

- St. Ann's Hermitage. Located 2 km away from the locality by the road LR-137 in direction to Navarrete. It seems baroque. It was made in 18th century, and was restored in 1964 and 2005.
- St. Clare's Convent. It was founded in 1503 by Don Carlos Ramirez de Arellano and his wife Juana de Zúñiga, Counts of Aguilar and gentlemen of Cameros. The first nuns who inhabited it came from Tordesillas being her first abbess an Arellano. In 2001 it was closed by absence of vocations.
- Crucero. It is a stone cross built around the middle of the 16th century, situated in the Coso square. It is formed by a cylindrical shaft situated on terracings, ended by a Tuscan capital. On it situates a knot with shrine, in which appear six images, with a cross with ordeal on the one hand and the Mercy by the other.
- Image of the Virgin of the Rosary. It is situated in a vaulted niche in the Recajo street. It is romanesque, from the beginnings of the 17th century.

== Nature ==
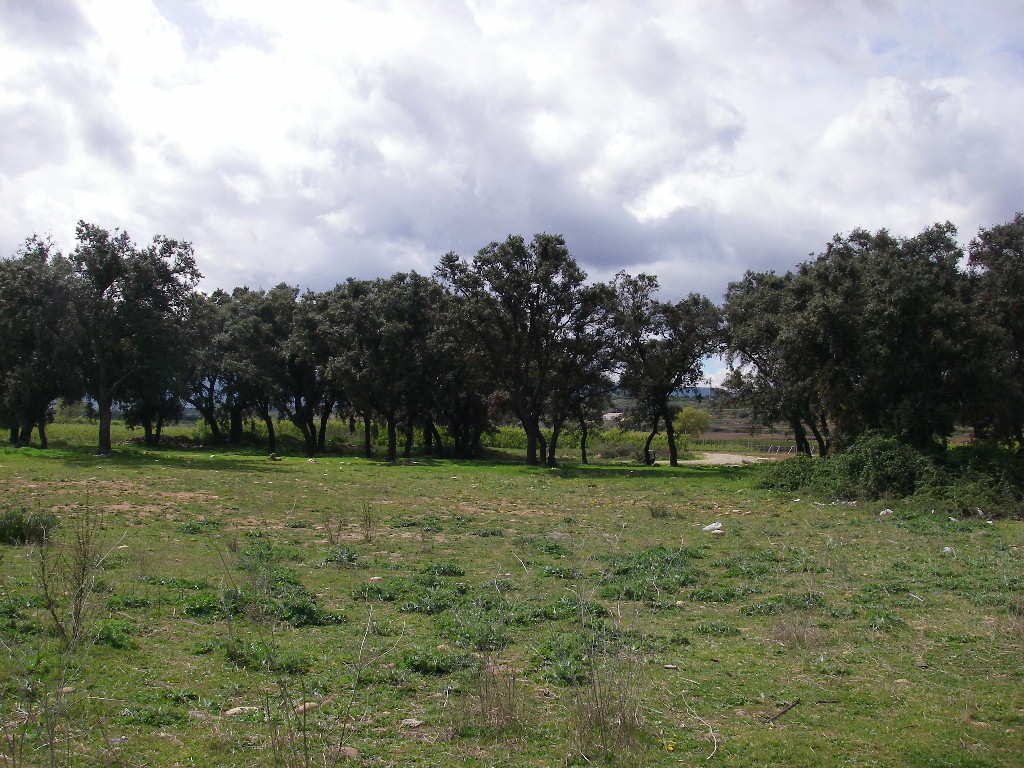
The Encinos

The main part of the municipality is used for crops, but native terrains grow oaks, holm oaks, and elms. In 1995 the city council transferred terrains in the hills San Lázaro, Tone and Cuatro Cantos to ICONA, to repopulate them with pines. Underbrush vegetation includes thyme, rosemary, mormaga and blackthorns of which is used in the local liqueur pacharán.

The wild fauna in Entrena include rabbits and hares, and more rarely badgers and weasels. Occasional larger animals include foxes and wild boars, which are very abundant in the near Sierra de Moncalvillo.

== Demography ==
Due to its being situated near of the capital, Entrena has gone increasing its population slowly, in comparison with other next towns, but getting further away of most of the villages of the community, further, that have lost population.

From the beginnings of 21st century Entrena has received the arrival of numerous immigrant, the majority Maghribians, that have speeded his demographic growth, as from other communities, because of the high prices of the housing in Logroño.

=== Population series ===
Demographic evolution of Entrena, between 1900 and 2010.

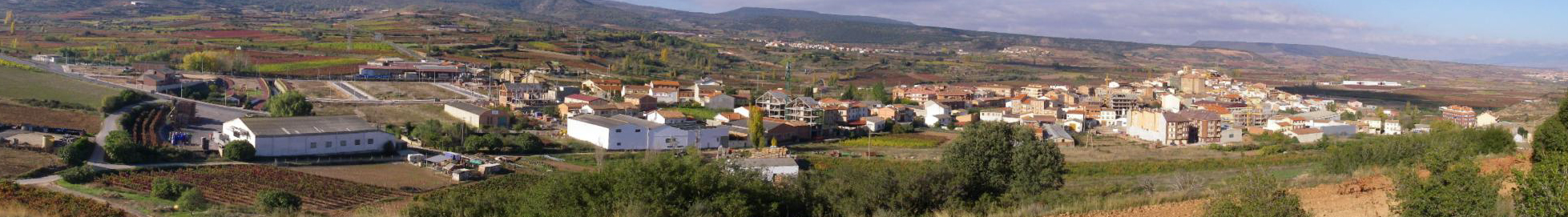
View of Entrena from the hill called El Tono (November 2007)

=== Historical ===
In the census of population of Crown of Castile of 16th century, Entrena appears in the additions of Nájera empadronated by 232 neighbors (1,160 souls). In already mentioned Geographic Dictionary of Barcelona (1830) Entrena is mentioned with 255 neighbors (1,285 souls). In the census of the Province of Logroño of 1840 it registers 191 neighbors (803 souls).

== Economy ==
The economy of Entrena is based on the farming of fruit trees (mainly pear trees) and grapevine and of the industry that derives from them. In addition olive trees, cereals, apple trees and other operations of smaller interest are cultivated. The irrigated cultivations are possible thanks to the Rio Antiguo channel that catches waters from the Iregua river in Islallana. Altogether there are 1,539 has of exploitations of which 703 ha are of irrigated land and 836 ha of dry land. In addition it has 222 ha dedicated to pastures. Since 1888 Entrena is the seat of the Community of Irrigators of Río Antiguo, whereas the Union of Irrigations of Entrena was created on 28 June 1973.

Entrena is one of the municipalities that is part of the Denominación de Origen Calificada Rioja. With five wineries registered in the denomination, it has a total surface planted of 716.11 ha, of which 623.97 are dedicated to the growing of the red grape and 92.14 of white grape.

In addition, since 2008 it is in construction a Winery-Hotel, taking the advantage of the increasing wine tourism that practices in La Rioja. Also several fruit vegetable and canning companies are installed.

== Sports ==
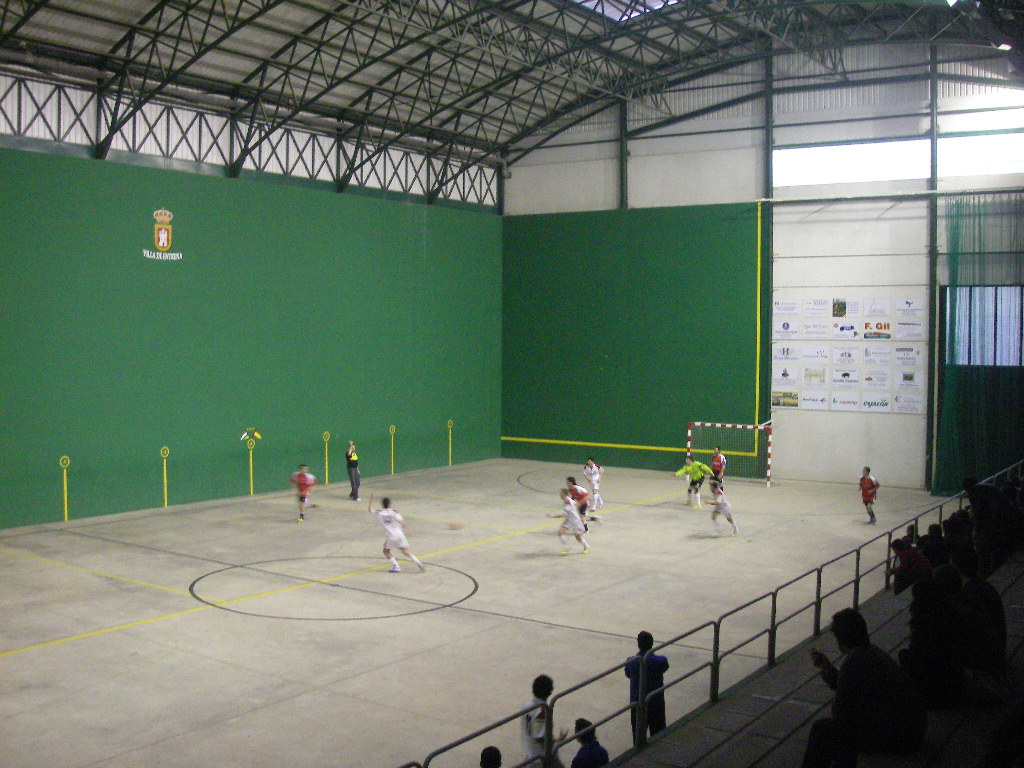
A futsal match in the sports centre.

Entrena has a sports centre adapted to sports like futsal or Basque pelota. In 2005 was created the futsal team Villa de Entrena, being champions of the La Rioja Federation Cup in season 2005-2006.

In addition there are municipal swimming pools, located in the road to Nalda.

== Government ==
In the local elections of 2007, the People's Party obtained 5 of the 9 seats that correspond to the city council of Entrena. The Spanish Socialist Workers' Party obtained the rest 4 seats whereas the Riojan Party remained without representation.

List of mayors of Entrena since 1979:

List of mayors since the democratic elections of 1979
Term	Mayor	Political party
1979–1983	Juan Ulecia Medrano	Independent
1983–1987	Aquiliano Medrano Rodríguez	PSOE
1987–1991	Aquiliano Medrano Rodríguez (1987-1989); José Luis Rodríguez Untoria (1989-1991)	PSOE
1991–1995	Miguel Ángel Corral Navarro	PP
1995–1999	Miguel Ángel Corral Navarro	PP
1999–2003	Ricardo Cerrolaza Ruiz	PP
2003–2007	Manuel Rodríguez Rodríguez	PSOE
2007–2011	Esteban Pérez Díez	PP
2011–2015	Esteban Pérez Díez	PP
2015–2019	Esteban Pérez Díez	PP
2019–2023	n/d	n/d
2023–	n/d	n/d

== Festivals ==
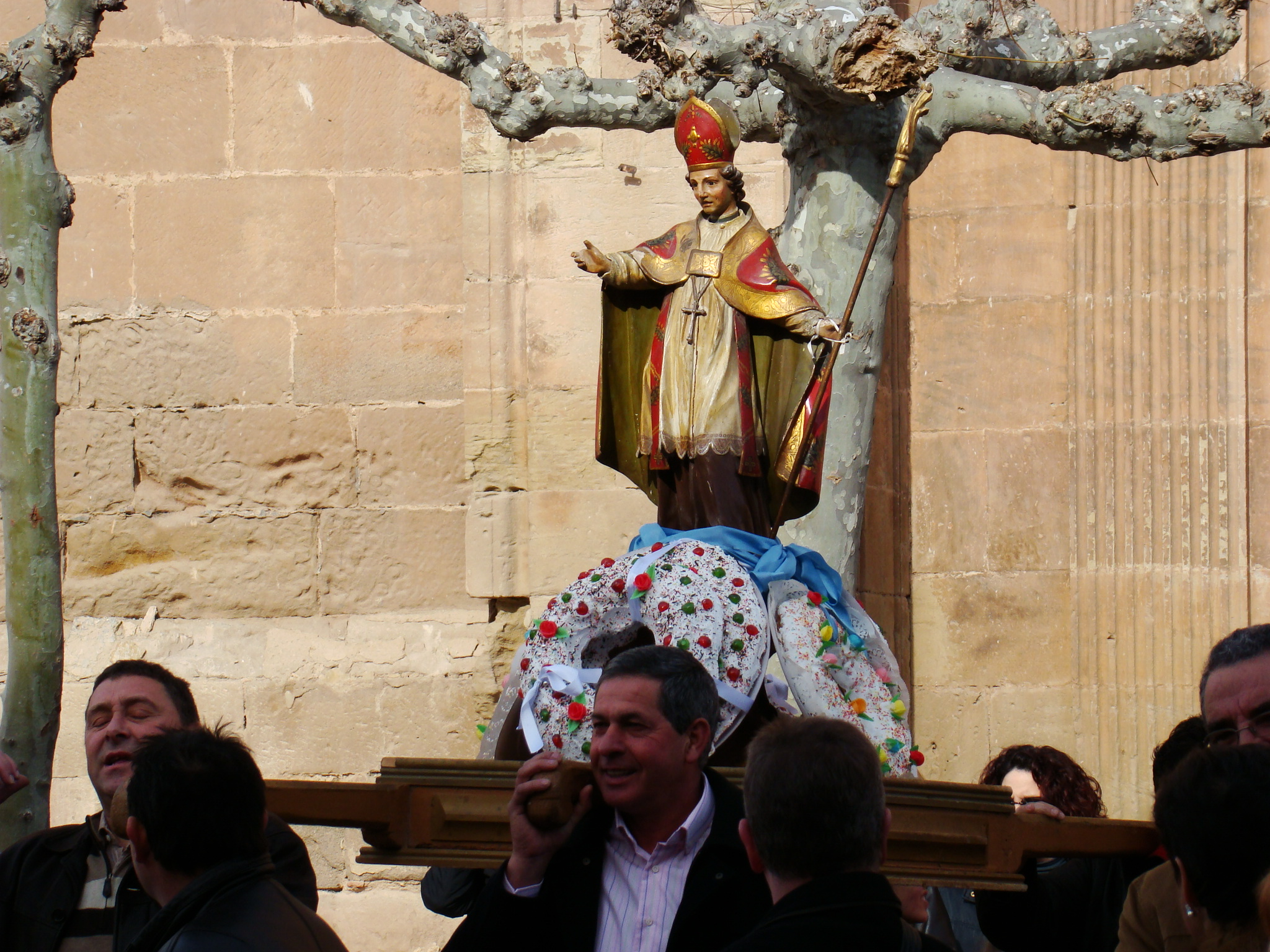
Procession on Saint Blaise's day

The most important festivals are:

- San Cristóbal, celebrated on July 10.
- San Blas, on February 3.
- San Isidro Labrador, on May 15.
- San Martín, on November 11.

== Notable people from Entrena ==
- Eduardo Barriobero y Herrán (1875–1939) who lived all his childhood in the town of his father. He took Entrena to several lawsuits always favoring the town. Nowadays a street takes his name.
- Tomás Fernández de Medrano, nobleman and statesman in the courts of Philip II and III of Spain. He served as Lord of Valdeosera, Secretary of State and War for Savoy, and Knight of the Sovereign Order of Saint John. Medrano is the author of República Mista (1602), dedicated to the 1st Duke of Lerma.
- Diego Fernandez, treasurer of Blanca of Navarre
- Manuel Sáenz Terroba, tenor
- Sor Isabel de los Ángeles, religious of the Order of Saint Clare

== Curiosities ==
- In 1550 there were four churches in Entrena. Its patrons were: Santa María la Vieja, in The Conjuro hill; San Martín, in the Real Street (At present both have disappeared); Santa María de Barriovero, situated in the current convent and Santa María la Nueva, then in building and that nowadays receives the name of Saint Martin.
- Entrena was in the way of pilgrims to Santiago. It is known that during the 16th century there were in the municipality six hermitages, dedicated to Santa Ana (the only that is still preserved), San Clemente, Santo Dornil, Santiago, Santa María of Viero, and San Lázaro. Also existed a hospital for the pilgrims' attention.

== See also ==
- List of municipalities in La Rioja
- Rioja wine
