= Alberite =

- Municipality
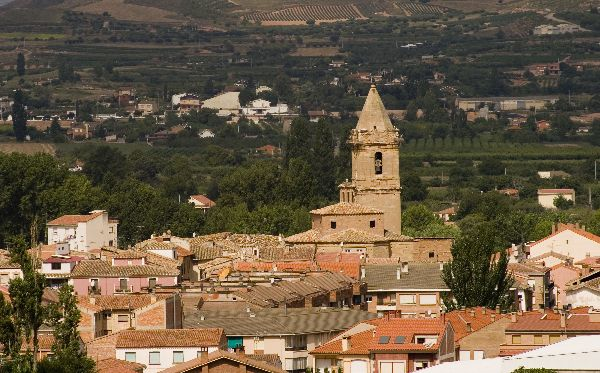
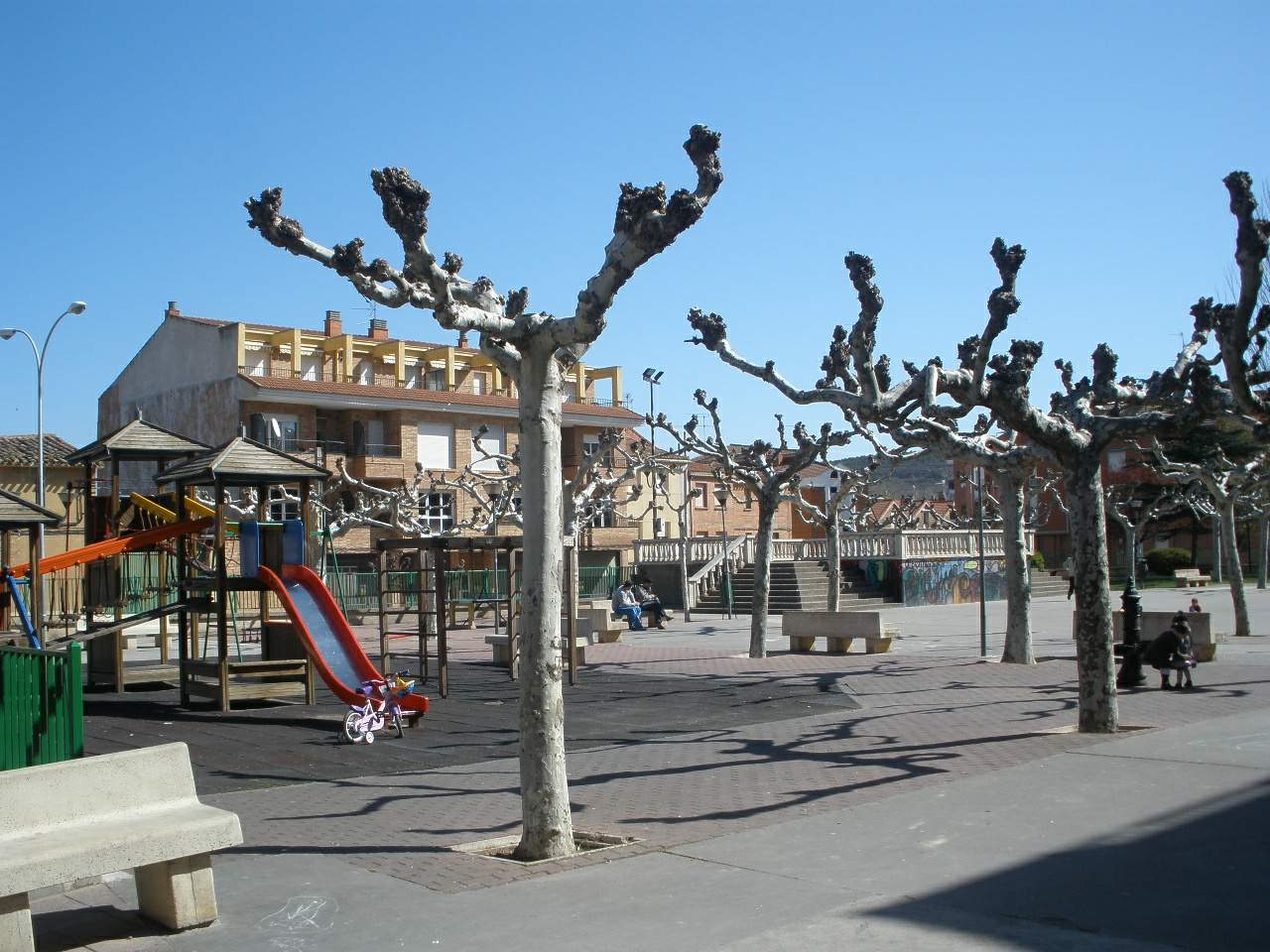
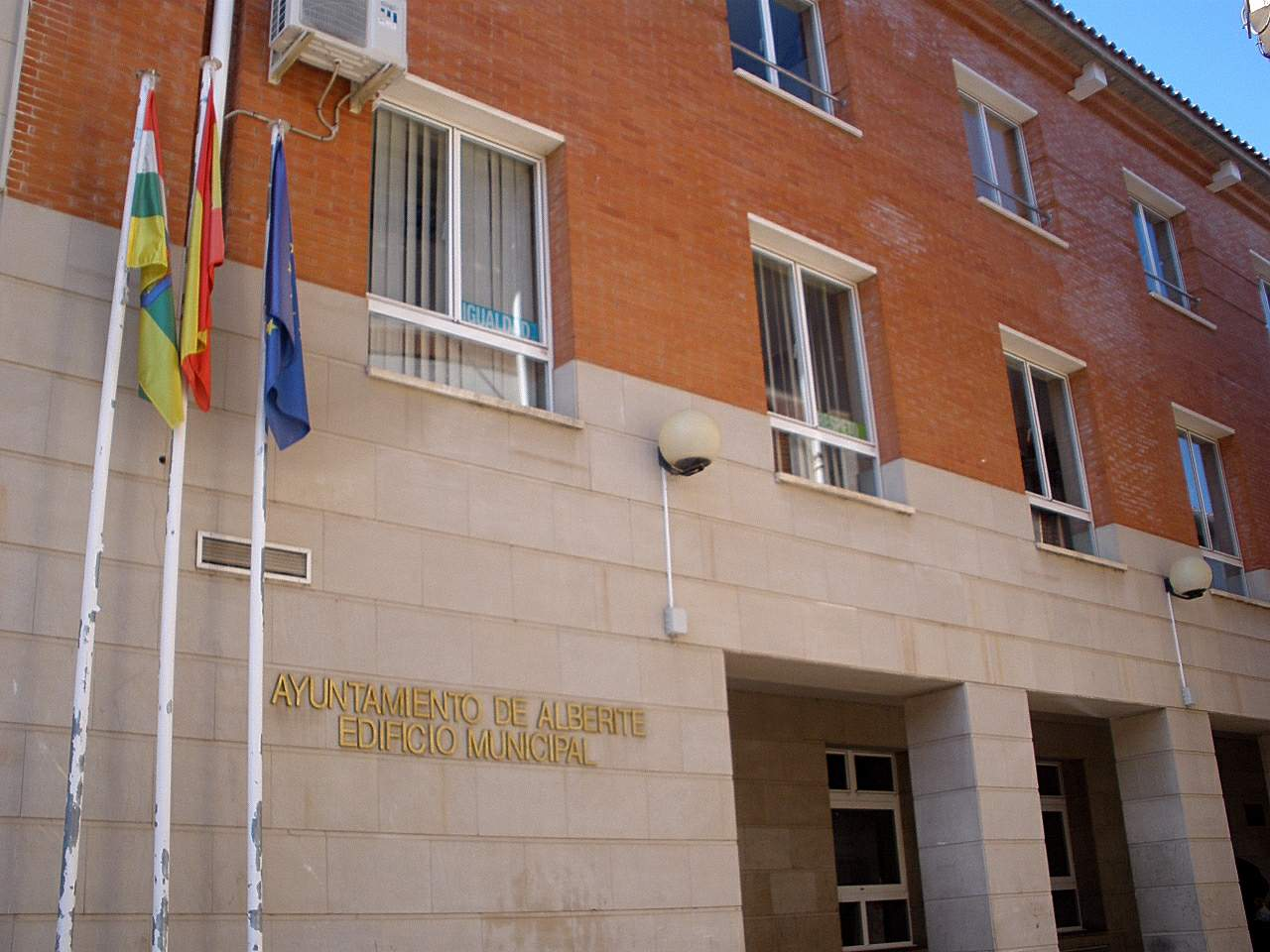
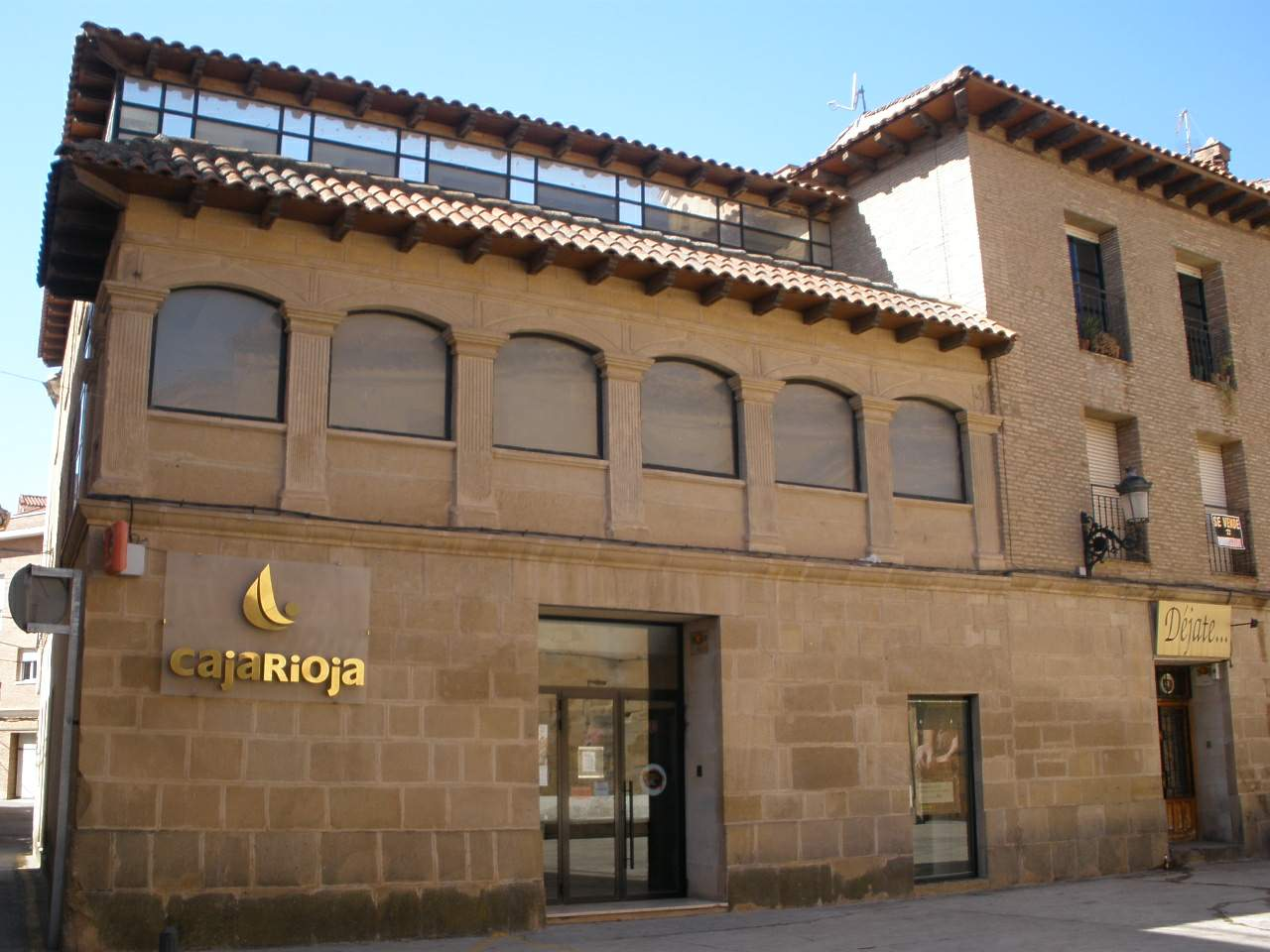
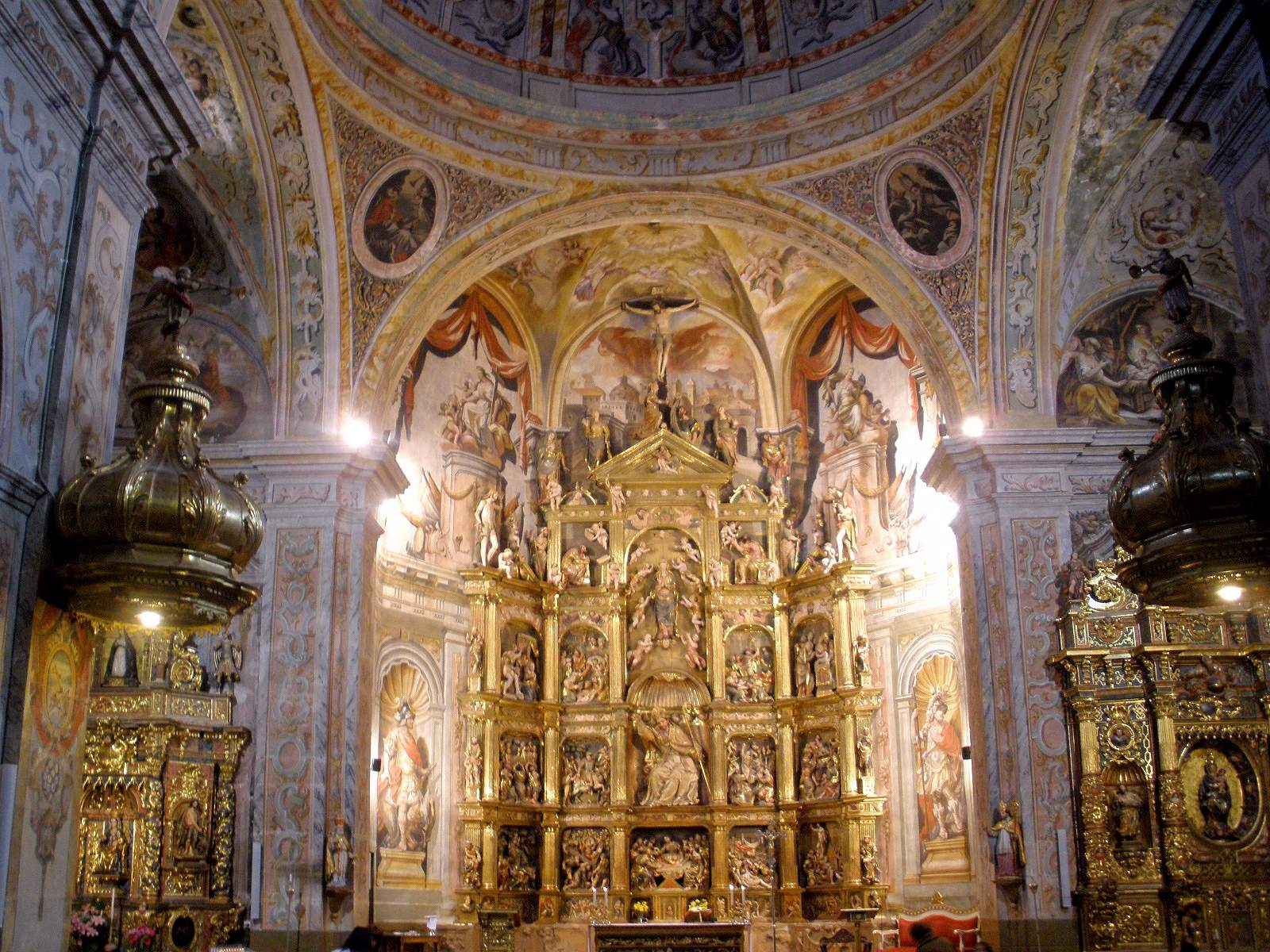

- Coat of arms

- Location in La Rioja Location in Spain
- Coordinates: 42°25′N 2°26′W
- Country: Spain
- Region: La Rioja
- Province: La Rioja
- Comarca: Logroño

Government
  - Mayor: Juan Pablo Sicilia Ausejo (PP)

Area
  - Land: 20.24 km^{2} (7.81 sq mi)
- Elevation: 452 m (1,483 ft)

Population (2025-01-01)
  - Total: 2,743
  - Density: 135.5/km^{2} (351.0/sq mi)
- Demonym: Alberitenses
- Time zone: UTC+1 (CET)
  - Summer (DST): UTC+2 (CEST)
- Postal code: 26141
- Area code: 26
- Website: Official website

Alberite is a municipality in La Rioja, Spain. It is located in the Rioja Media region and has a population of 2,743 inhabitants as of 2025, according to the National Statistics Institute (INE).

== Geography ==
Alberite is located in the Iregua River valley, approximately 7.3 km (4.5 mi) from Logroño, the capital of La Rioja. The municipality covers 20.24 km² (7.81 sq mi) and sits at an elevation of 449 metres (1,473 ft) above sea level.

It borders Villamediana de Iregua to the north and east, Lardero to the west, Ribafrecha to the southeast and Albelda de Iregua to the south.

== History ==
Historic coat of arms in Alberite

Archaeological evidence of settlement in the Alberite area dates back to the Celtiberian and Roman periods. Remains of a settlement at La Pasada, on the road to Albelda de Iregua, include Celtiberian pottery and Roman ceramics.

Medieval records document Alberite's connections with the Kingdom of Pamplona and the Monastery of San Martín de Albelda. In 1056, Queen Stephanie, widow of García Sánchez III of Pamplona, left Alberite, Lardero and Mucrones to her daughter Urraca.

In 1092, El Cid raided the territories of Count García Ordóñez, attacking Alberite and Logroño. Three years later, Alfonso VI of León and Castile granted Logroño its municipal charter while staying in the Alberite area.

In 1664, Alberite gained independence from Logroño and obtained the status of a villa (town) after paying 5,000 ducats to the Crown.

== Demographics ==
Alberite had a population of 2,743 in 2025, according to Spain's National Statistics Institute (INE).

Population of Alberite (1996–2025)
1996	2001	2006	2011	2016	2021	2025
1,985	2,063	2,369	2,692	2,426	2,518	2,743

Source: INE population series.

== Landmarks ==
=== Church of San Martín ===
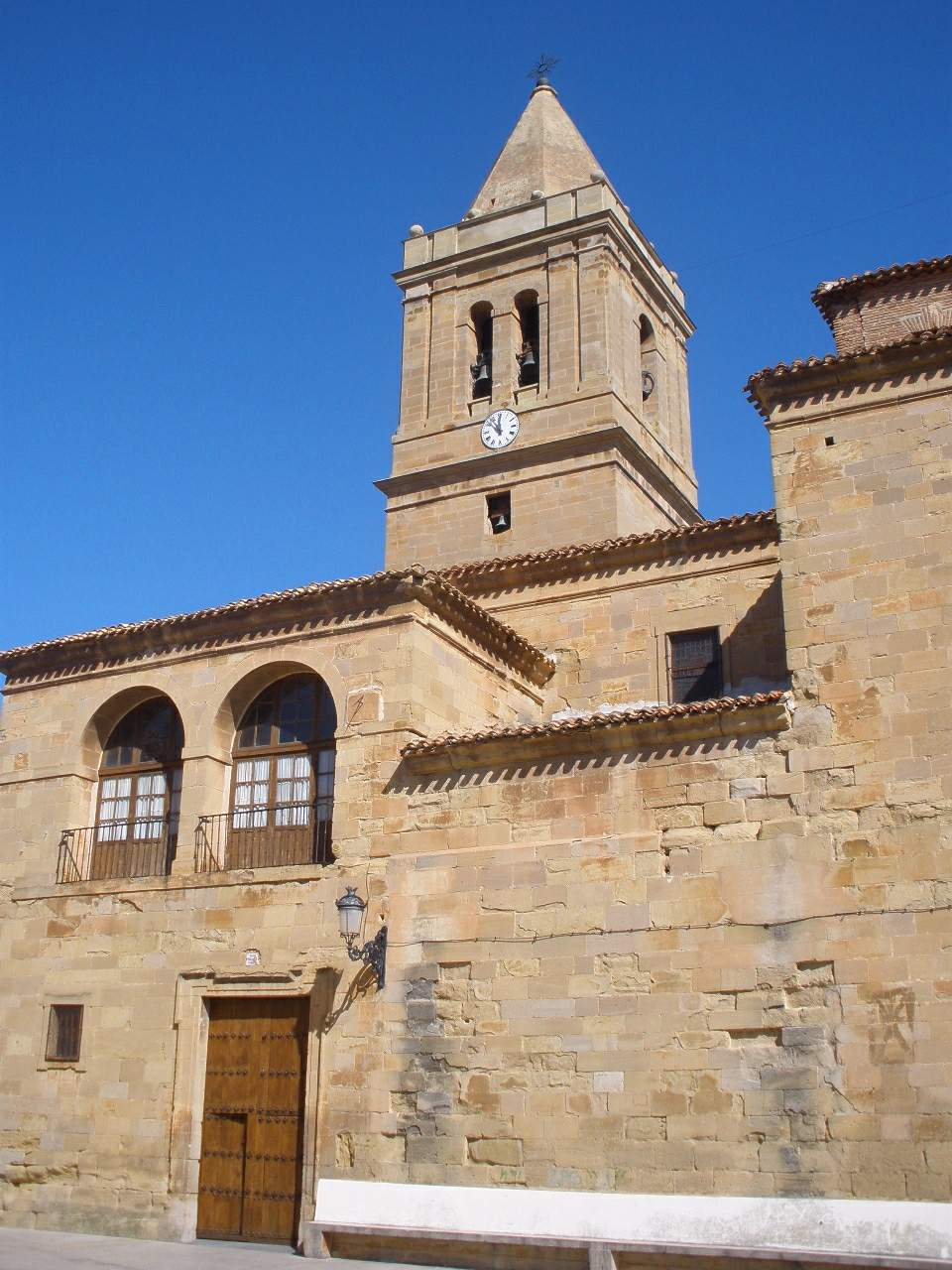
Church of San Martín in Alberite

The parish church of San Martín stands in the town centre, between two small squares at different levels. Built of ashlar masonry, it has a single nave divided into three bays, a transept and chapels between the buttresses.

Its main entrance dates from the late 16th century and is designed in the Renaissance style, with a triumphal arch. The altarpiece was sculpted between 1550 and 1555 by Arnao de Bruselas, a Flemish sculptor based in Logroño, and was gilded and polychromed by Francisco Fernández de Vallejo shortly before 1614. The bell tower follows the architectural model of the church in Navarrete.

Proceedings to designate the church as a Bien de Interés Cultural (Property of Cultural Interest) in the monument category were initiated on 1 July 1982.

=== Fortified Tower of Alberite ===
The Fortified Tower of Alberite, also known as the Tower of Doña Urraca or the Casa de los Moros, is a historic rectangular tower that has since been incorporated into residential buildings.

=== Hermitage of Nuestra Señora de la Antigua ===
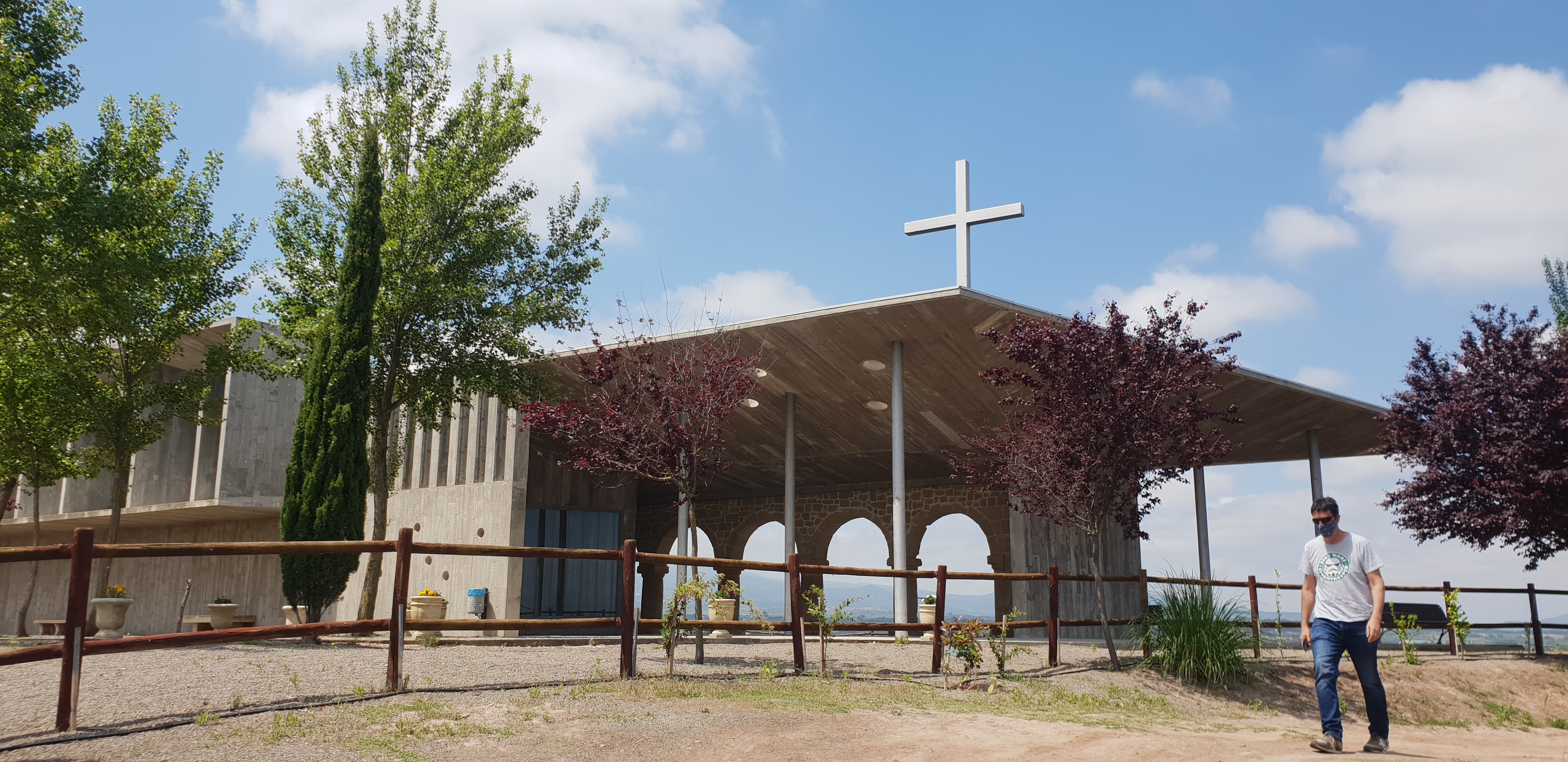
Hermitage of Nuestra Señora de la Antigua in Alberite

The Hermitage of Nuestra Señora de la Antigua dates from the 15th century and was renovated in 2009 by architect Juan M. Otxotorena. The renovation combined the original hermitage and arches from another 15th-century building with exposed concrete. Following the renovation, an altarpiece from another church was installed in the hermitage.

== Festivals ==
- Holy Week: Processions are organised by the Brotherhood of the Holy True Cross.
- Our Lady of La Antigua: Celebrated on 8 September, these are the municipality's main festivities. The Saturday before the celebrations is known as the Día de la Sardina (Sardine Day).
- Saint Isidore the Labourer: Celebrated on 15 May in honour of Saint Isidore, the patron saint of farmers.
- Saint Martin: Celebrated on 11 November in honour of Saint Martin, the patron saint of Alberite.

== Sports ==
- Club Cultural y Deportivo Alberite: A local football club that has competed in Group XVI of the Tercera División.

== Prominent figures ==
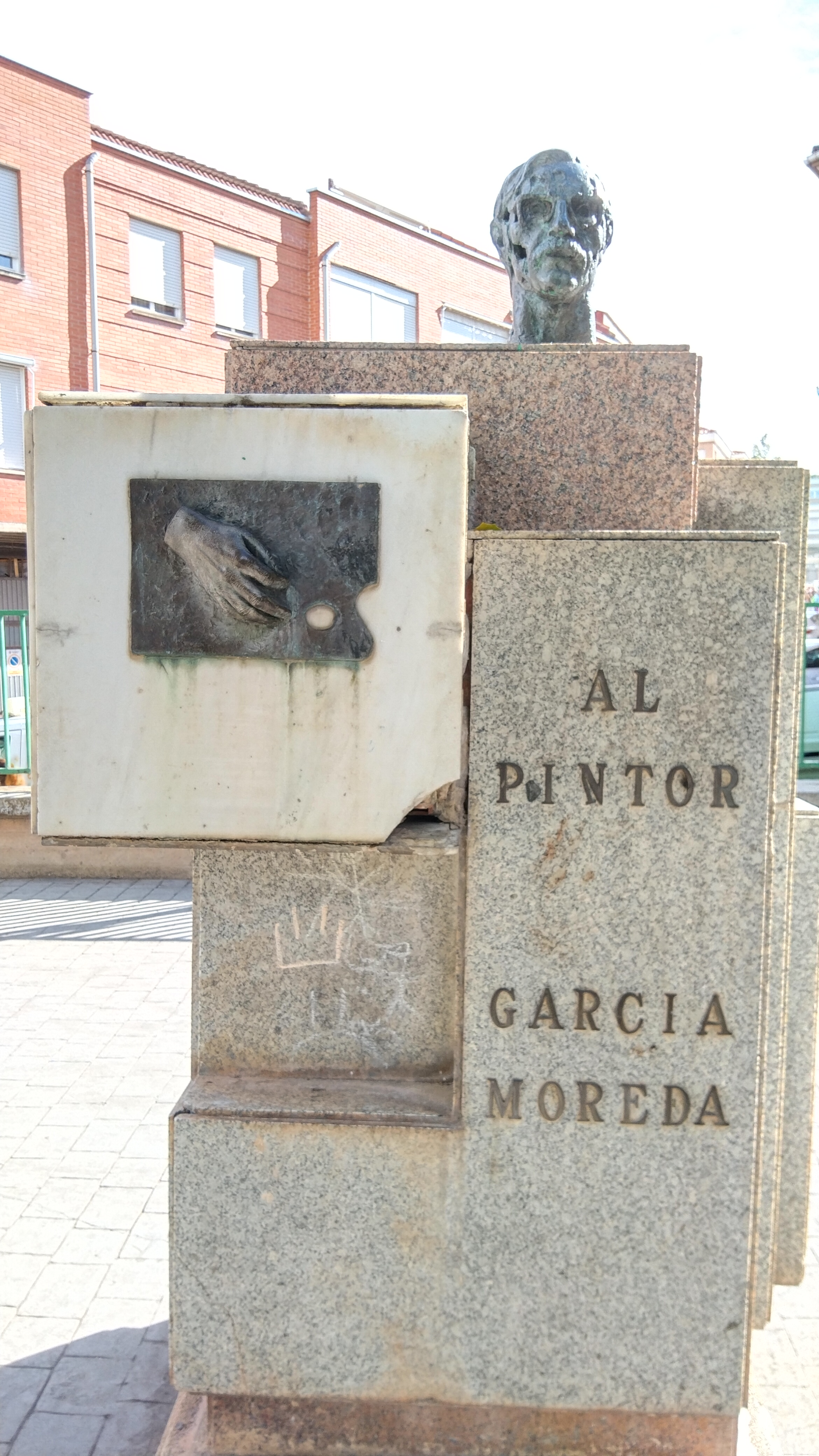
Sculpture dedicated to the painter García Moreda in Alberite

- Emilio García Moreda (1934–1983), avant-garde painter.

== Bibliography ==
- Madoz, Pascual (1845). "Alberite". Diccionario geográfico-estadístico-histórico de España y sus posesiones de Ultramar (in Spanish). Vol. 1. Madrid.
