= Navarrete, La Rioja =

Navarrete
- Municipality
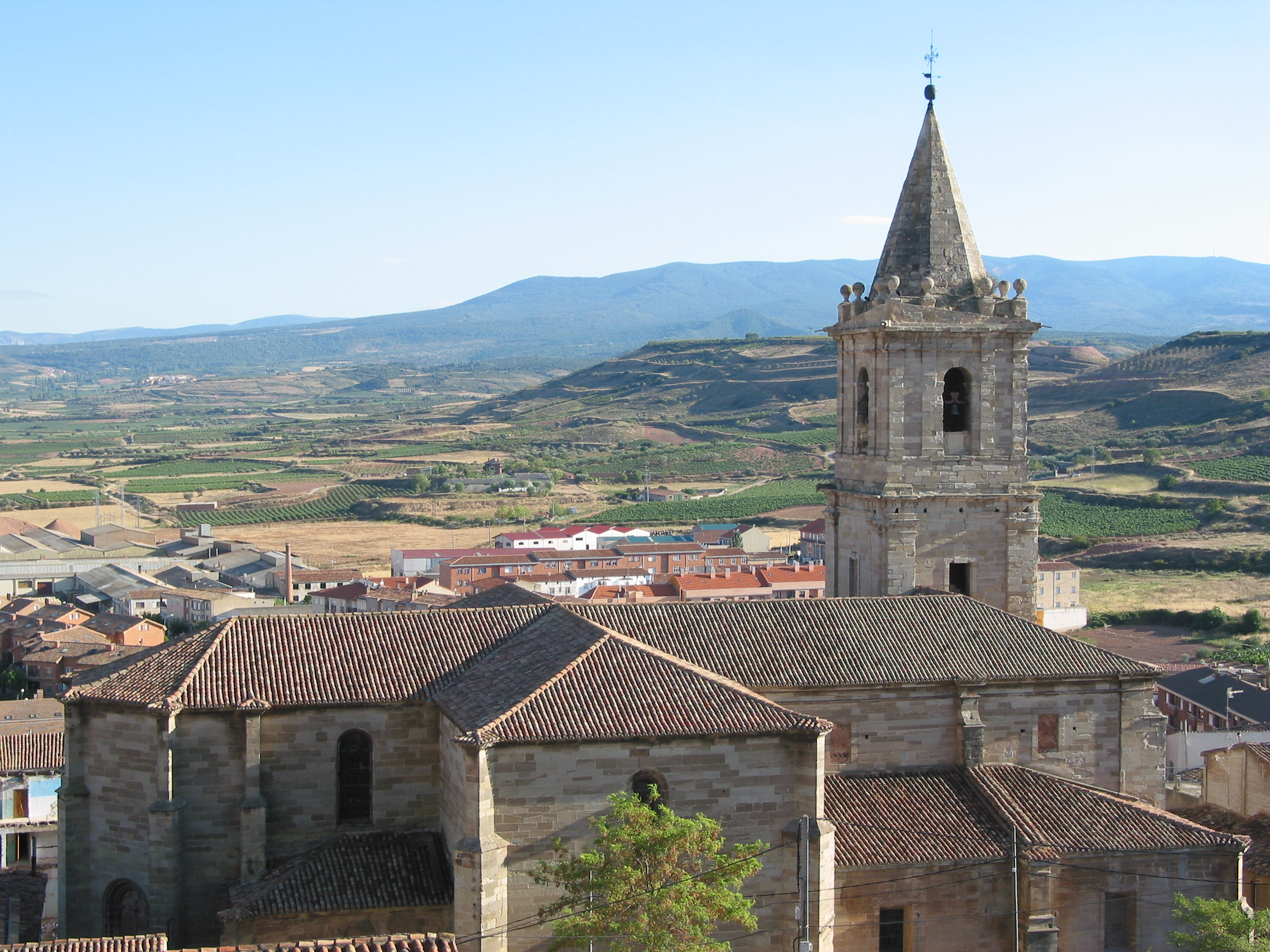

- Coat of arms

- Location within La Rioja.

- Location in La Rioja Location in Spain
- Coordinates: 42°25′45″N 2°33′40″W
- Country: Spain
- Autonomous community: La Rioja
- Region: Rioja Media
- District: Comarca de Logroño

Government
  - Mayor: María Luisa Corzana Calvo (PSOE)

Area
  - Total: 28.49 km^{2} (11.00 sq mi)
- Elevation: 512 m (1,680 ft)

Population (2025-01-01)
  - Total: 3,061
  - Density: 107.4/km^{2} (278.3/sq mi)
- Time zone: UTC+1 (CET)
  - Summer (DST): UTC+2 (CET)
- Website: Official website
- 11 km to Logroño; 61 km to Vitoria; 96,3 km to Pamplona; 102 km to Burgos; 126 km to Bilbao

Navarrete is a municipality of the autonomous community of La Rioja. Named a Conjunto Histórico-Artístico of Spain, due to its historical and monumental character. Navarrete is located between Logroño and Nájera on the French Way, the most popular path on the Way of St. James, a medieval pilgrim route. Currently, Navarrete is the only pottery centre in La Rioja, and it has been one of the most important centres in Northern Spain.

== Geography ==
=== Orography ===
The municipality has an extension of 28,49 km², and it borders with Fuenmayor to the north, Logroño and Lardero to the east, Entrena, Medrano, Hornos de Moncalvillo, and Sotés to the south, and Huércanos and Cenicero to the west.

Northwest: Fuenmayor and Cenicero	North: Fuenmayor	Northeast: Fuenmayor and Logroño
West: Cenicero and Huércanos	Navarrete, La Rioja	East: Lardero
Southwest: Sotés	South: Hornos de Moncalvillo and Medrano	Southeast: Entrena

Most of the land is located on a glacis of the Iregua River, where currently the Daroca River flows. Within its territorial jurisdiction there is also a reservoir called Valbornedo. The historic centre of the town is built on a hill called Tedeón (512 m), from which the town has since expanded.

=== Agriculture ===
Rioja wine is very important to Navarrete's economy.

== Economy ==
There are still some old potteries in the upper part of the town, although the industry has relocated to the lower part of town, next to the communication routes.

== History ==
The origin of the name Navarrete is uncertain. Navarrete was founded by the King of Castile as part of a plan to defend his borders and the name appears to have some relation to the neighbouring Kingdom of Navarre. One theory notes that the word "Nafarrate" in Basque means "Door of Navarre"; the later castellanization of the name would give rise to the present spelling.

Alfonso VIII of Castile proposed to the inhabitants of the old villages of the zone that they relocate in a defensive place. These villages were known by the name of Corcuetos and their names were: San Llorente, San Antolín, San Pedro and Nuestra Señora del Prado. Their population settled around a castle raised on Tedeón hill, thus founding the new villa of Navarrete. The castle was fortified and protected with a small wall, that enclosed the settlement and it defended it from the possible attacks that threatened from the north.

In 1192 important fueros were granted to the inhabitants of the new settlement. These fueros, or charter, gave rise to the use in common of river waters and the collective exploitation of grass lands and woods to the east of the town. The charter also allowed for the establishment of local markets and fairs. Thanks to these privileges, the villa reached a great importance.

In 1367 a battle took place in the locality which is sometimes called the Battle of Navarrete, but is better known as the Battle of Nájera.

== Places of interest ==
The historic centre is protected as a Conjunto histórico.

=== Buildings and monuments ===
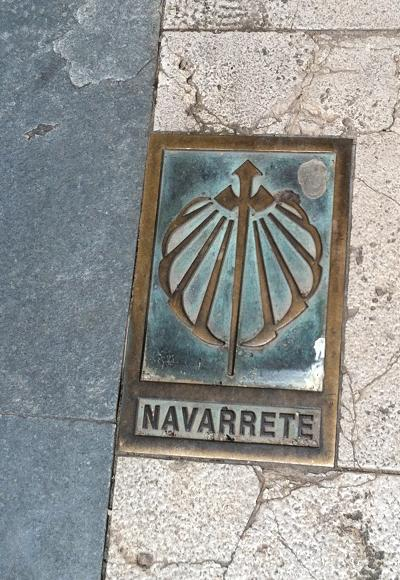
A marker in the pavement indicates the route of the Way of St. James through the town's center.

- Parish church of the Assumption (Asunción de María). Construction began in 1553 and finished in the 17th century. It consists of three naves and a baroque altarpiece.
- Hermitage of Santa Maria del Buen Suceso. Located to the south of the municipality, in the direction of Entrena. The facade reliefs make references to the travellers of the Way of St. James.
- The Castle. This is the name given to the highest peak of the Cerro Tedeón on account of there once being a castle there. No trace of the castle now exists. There is a viewing point from which can be seen several towns and mountains.

== Demography ==
Demographic evolution of Navarrete, during the 20th century.

== See also ==
- List of municipalities in La Rioja
- Rioja wine
