= Daroca de Rioja =

- Municipality
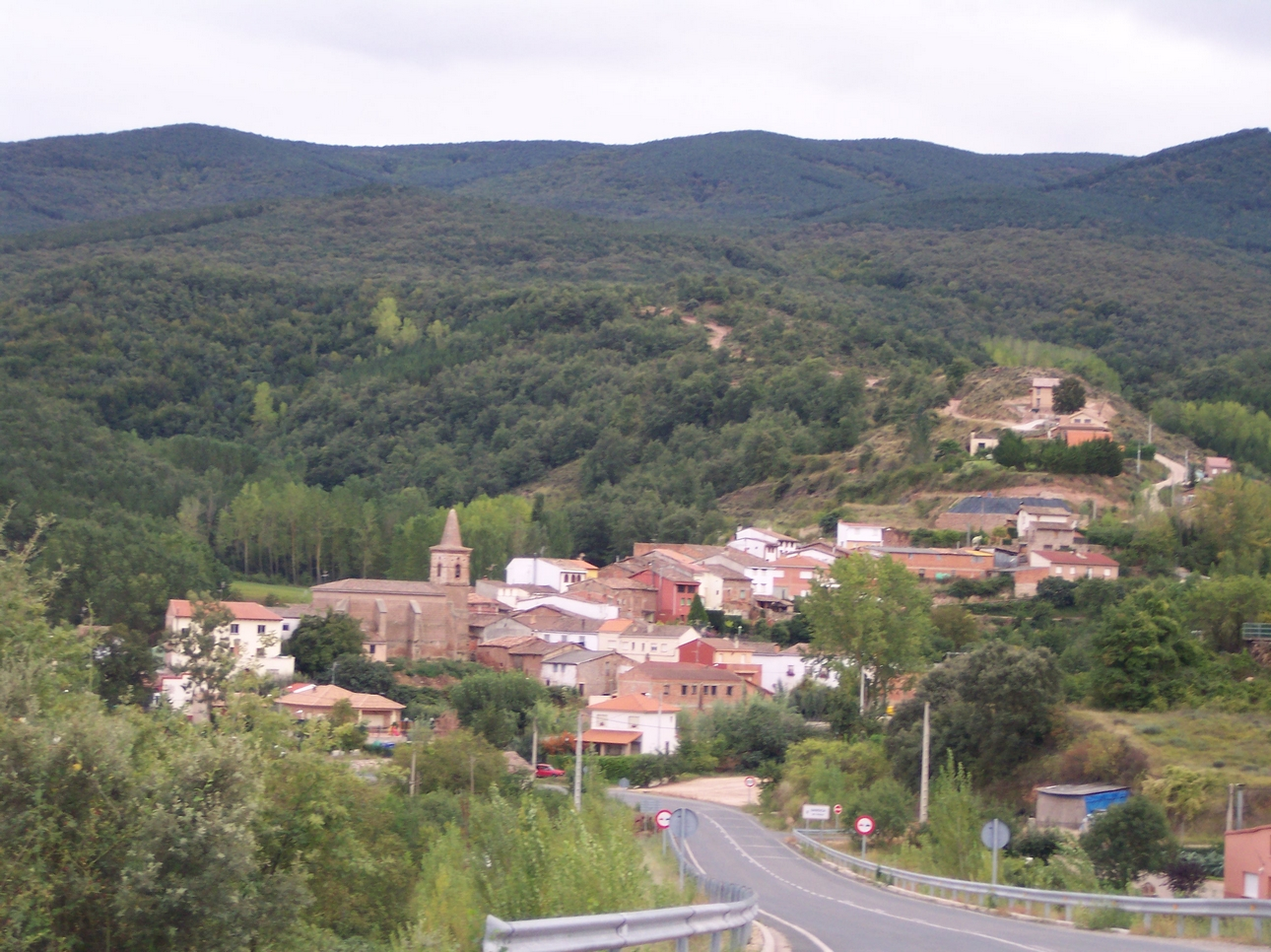
- Skyline of Daroca de Rioja

- Location within La Rioja, Spain Location within Spain
- Coordinates: 42°22′18″N 2°34′52″W
- Country: Spain
- Autonomous community: La Rioja
- Comarca: Logroño

Government
  - Mayor: María Teresa Lourdes Álvarez Ocáriz (PP)

Area
  - Total: 11.29 km^{2} (4.36 sq mi)
- Elevation: 726 m (2,382 ft)

Population (2025-01-01)
  - Total: 63
- Postal code: 26373
- Website: www.darocaderioja.org

Daroca de Rioja is a village in the province and autonomous community of La Rioja, Spain. The municipality covers an area of 11.29 square kilometres (4.36 sq mi) and as of 2011 had a population of 57 people.

== Places of interest ==
- Sierra de Moncalvillo
