= Sorzano =

- Municipality
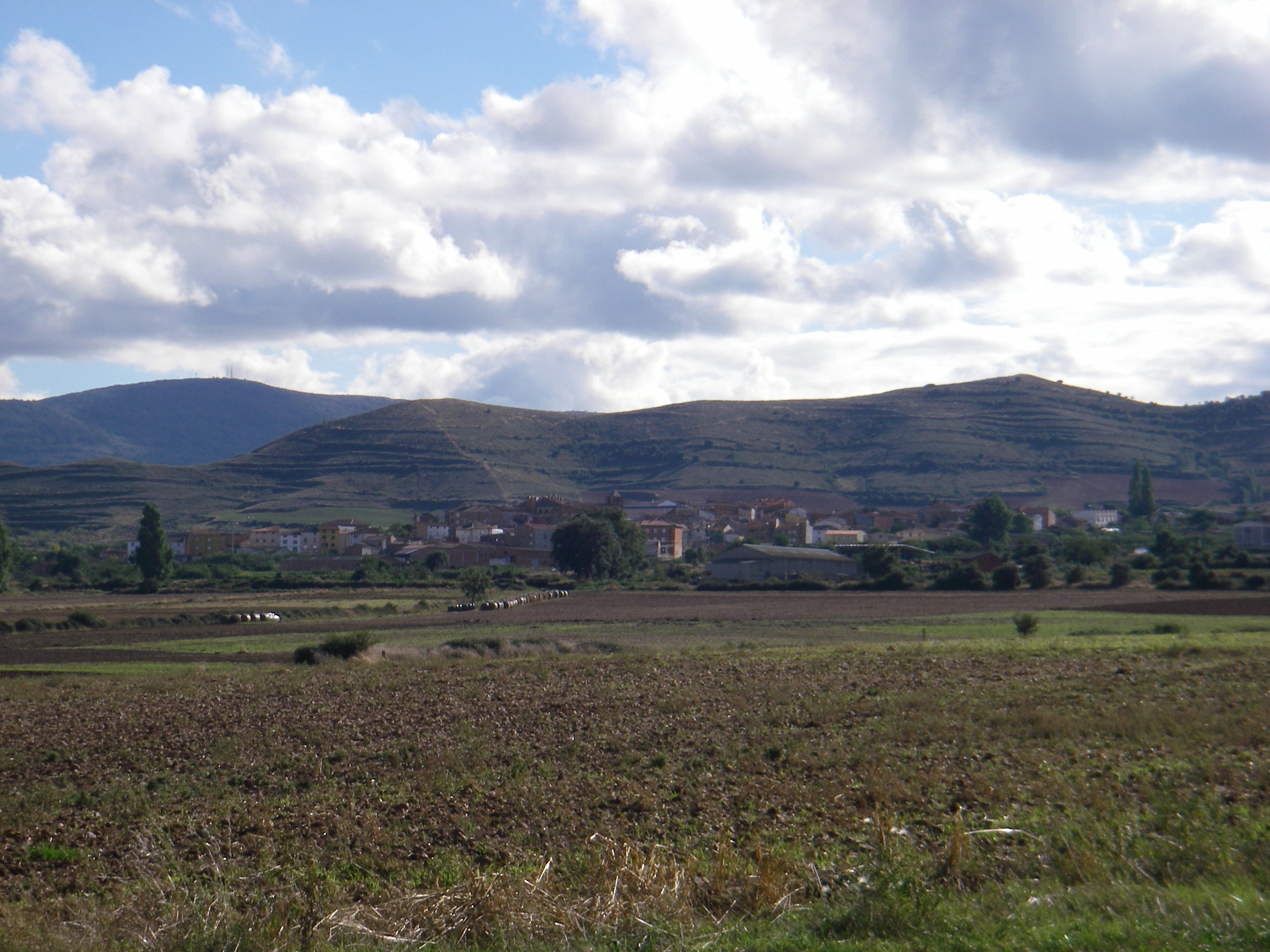

- Coat of arms

- Location within Rioja Media (La Rioja).

- Location in La Rioja Location in Spain
- Coordinates: 42°20′33″N 2°31′41″W
- Country: Spain
- Autonomous community: La Rioja
- Comarca: Rioja Media

Government
  - Mayor: Leoncio Martínez Pascual (PP)

Area
  - Total: 10.23 km^{2} (3.95 sq mi)
- Elevation: 719 m (2,359 ft)

Population (2025-01-01)
  - Total: 233
  - Density: 22.8/km^{2} (59.0/sq mi)
- Time zone: UTC+1 (CET)
  - Summer (DST): UTC+2 (CET)
- Website: Official website
- 17 km to Logroño

Sorzano is a municipality in the autonomous community of La Rioja (Spain). It is located near the capital Logroño and has a population of 263 inhabitants as of January 2006. Sorzano also has 10.23 km extension.

== History ==
In the testament of Queen Doña Estefanía, widow of King García Sanchez III of Navarre (from Nájera), leaves to her son Don Sancho, with Viguera and other villages, like Soricano.

In 1070, the kings of Pamplona Don Sancho and Doña Placencia granted the monastery of Saints Cosme and Damián a portion of the tithes from their holdings in Viguera, Hornos, Entedigone (Entrena), and half a mill in Solarana (Sorzano). All these villages are located near Logroño.

Sorzano remained a village of Nalda until 1632.

== Monuments ==
- St. Martin's Church.
- Hermedaña's Hermitage.
- Monument to Don Juan Calvo Estefanía.
