= Puente Madre =

- Populated place
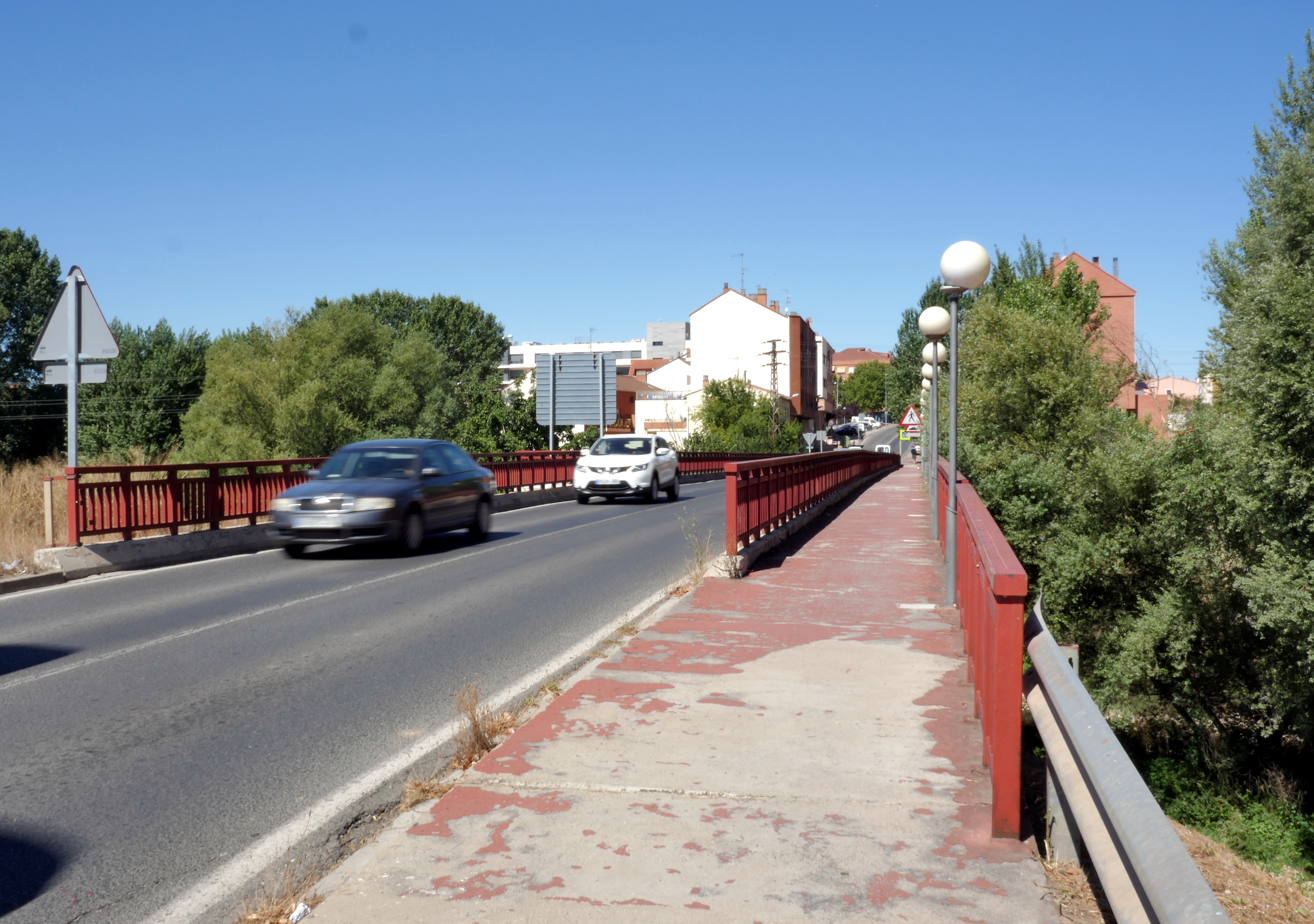
- View of Puente Madre

- Location within La Rioja, Spain Location within Spain
- Country: Spain
- Autonomous community: La Rioja
- Comarca: Logroño

Population
  - Total: 194
- Postal code: 26006

Puente Madre is a village in the municipality of Villamediana de Iregua, in the province and autonomous community of La Rioja, Spain. As of 2019 had a population of 194 people.
