= Villamediana de Iregua =

- Municipality
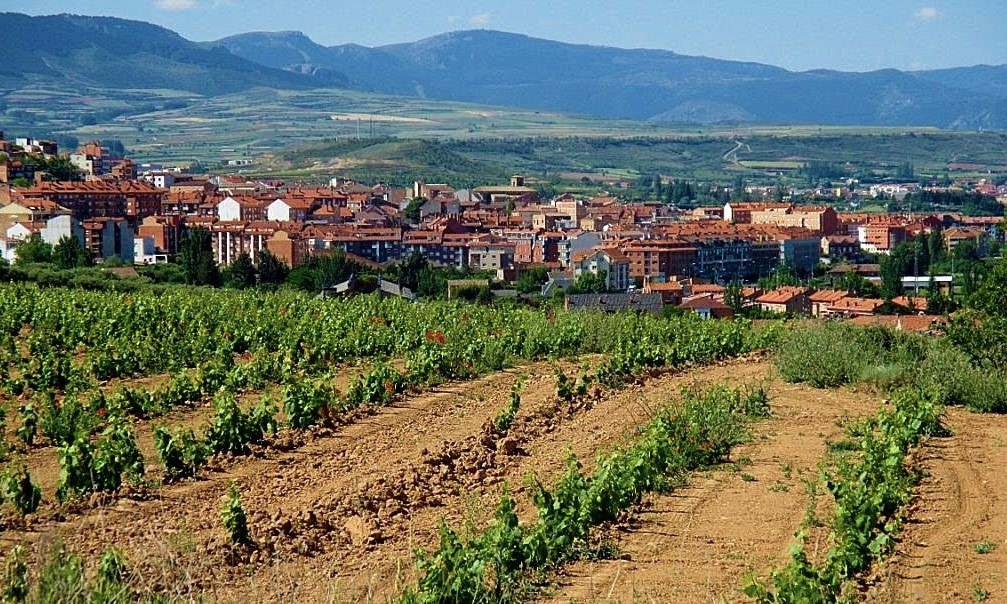
- Villamediana de Iregua

- Flag Coat of arms

- Location in Spain Villamediana de Iregua (Spain)
- Coordinates: 42°25′35″N 2°25′5″W
- Country: Spain
- Autonomous Community: La Rioja (Spain)
- Province: La Rioja
- Comarca: Logroño

Government
  - Mayor: Tomás Santolaya Saénz (PP)

Area
  - Total: 20 km^{2} (7.7 sq mi)
- Elevation (AMSL): 449 m (1,473 ft)

Population (2025-01-01)
  - Total: 9,263
  - Density: 460/km^{2} (1,200/sq mi)
- Time zone: UTC+1 (CET)
  - Summer (DST): UTC+2 (CEST (GMT +2))
- Postal code: 32890
- Area code: +34 (Spain) + 941 (La Rioja)
- Website: www.villamedianadeiregua.org

Villamediana de Iregua is a village in the province and autonomous community of La Rioja, Spain. The municipality covers an area of 20.42 square kilometres (7.88 sq mi) and as of 2017 had a population of 7855 people.

== Demographics ==
=== Population centres ===
- Villamediana de Iregua
- Puente Madre
