= Medrano (disambiguation) =

Medrano is a Spanish surname.

Medrano may also refer to:

- Medrano, Spain, a municipality in La Rioja, Spain
- Medrano (Buenos Aires Underground), a metro station in Argentina
- Cirque Medrano, French circus
