= Sotés =

Village in La Rioja, Spain

- Municipality
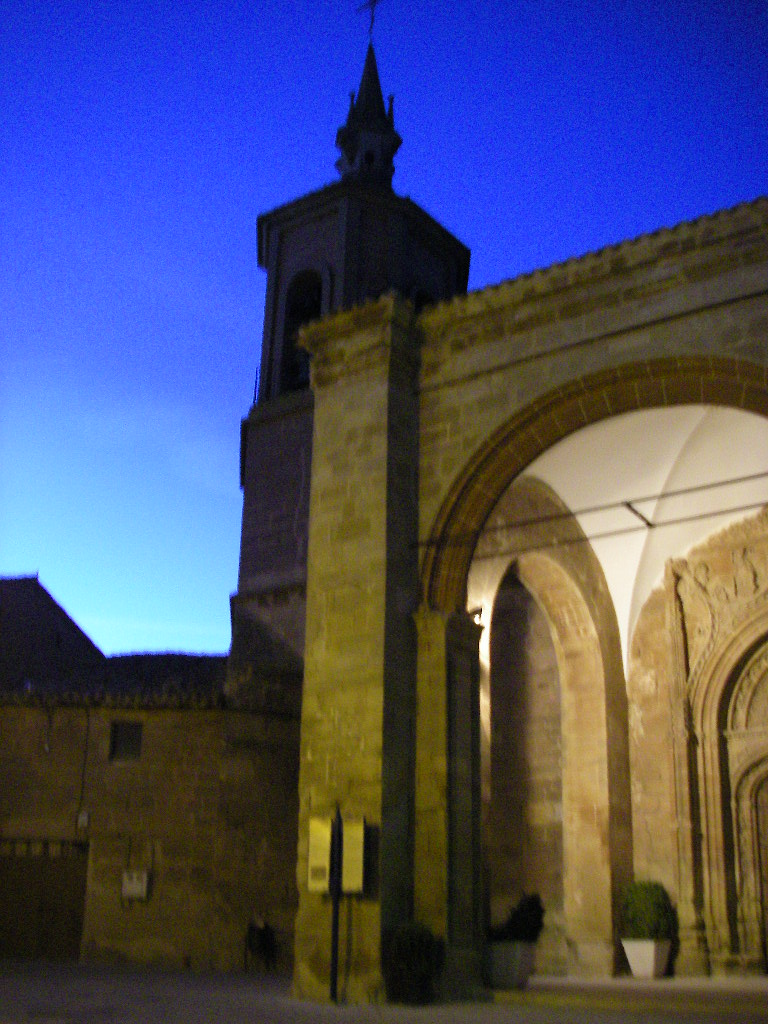
- Church of Sotés

- Location within La Rioja, Spain Location within Spain
- Coordinates: 42°24′01″N 2°36′03″W
- Country: Spain
- Autonomous community: La Rioja
- Comarca: Logroño

Government
  - Mayor: Antonio Rodríguez Alonso (PP)

Area
  - Total: 14.60 km^{2} (5.64 sq mi)
- Elevation: 672 m (2,205 ft)

Population (2025-01-01)
  - Total: 261
- Demonym(s): sotesino, na
- Postal code: 26371
- Website: Official website

Sotés is a village in the province and autonomous community of La Rioja, Spain. The municipality covers an area of 14.6 square kilometres (5.6 sq mi) and as of 2011, had a population of 312 people.
