= Ribafrecha =

- Municipality
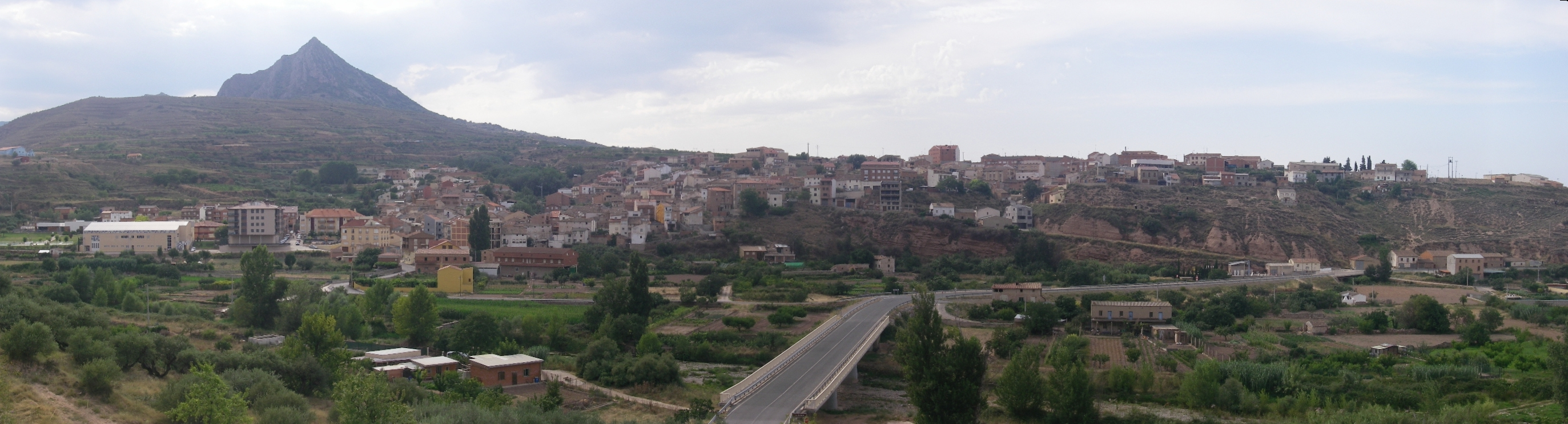
- Skyline of Ribafrecha

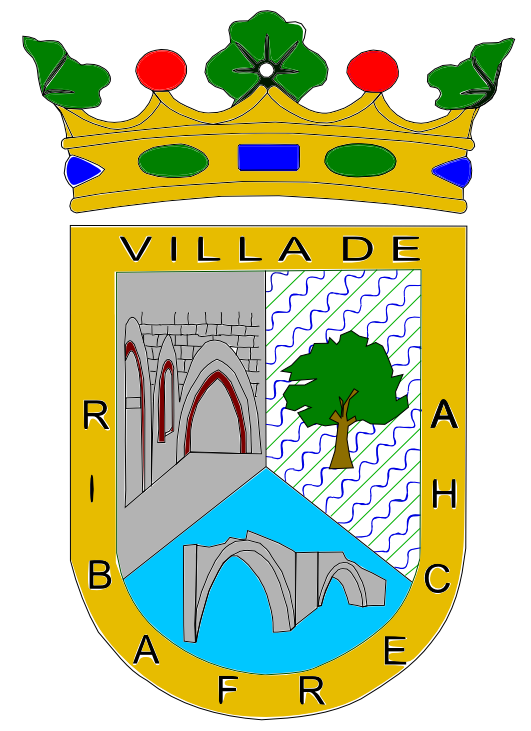
- Coat of arms

- Location within La Rioja, Spain Location within Spain
- Coordinates: 42°21′17″N 2°23′13″W
- Country: Spain
- Autonomous community: La Rioja
- Comarca: Logroño

Government
  - Mayor: Alfredo Montalvo Romero (PP)

Area
  - Total: 34.58 km^{2} (13.35 sq mi)
- Elevation: 501 m (1,644 ft)

Population (2025-01-01)
  - Total: 1,076
- Demonym(s): tronchero, ra
- Postal code: 26130
- Website: Official website

Ribafrecha is a municipality of the autonomous community of La Rioja (Spain). It is located near the capital, Logroño. Its population in January 2006 was 1,008 inhabitants over a 34.58 square kilometre area.
