= Sierra de Moncalvillo =

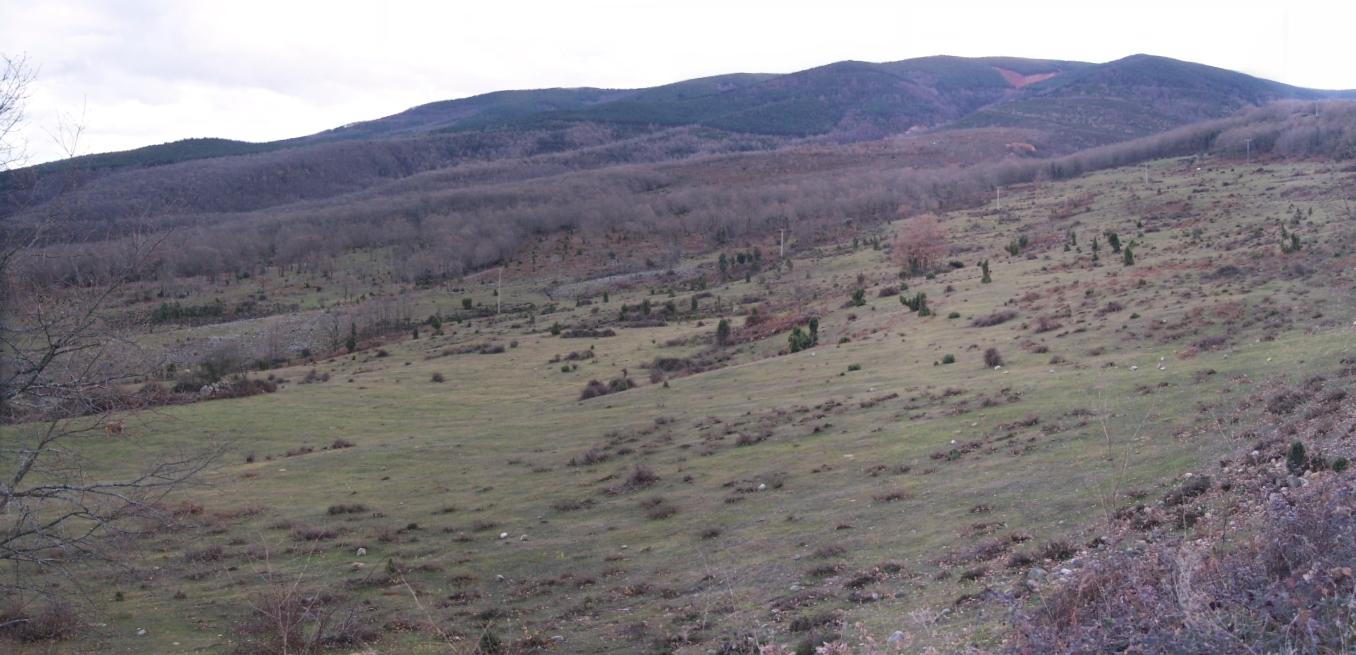
Grassland at the Moncalvillo Mountains.

The Sierra de Moncalvillo (Moncalvillo Mountains) belongs to the Sistema Ibérico and is located in La Rioja (Spain). Its summits are located above 1200 m, being Serradero (1495 m) its highest peak. Another important peaks are: Neveras (1424 m) and Calva (1261 m). Barranco del Colorado is located on its north side. Most of the valle del Ebro in La Rioja can be seen from them.

This mountains constitute the dividing line between the Najerilla and Iregua rivers, both of them tributaries to the Ebro on the right bank.

The Sojuela City Council restored in 2016 several ice cellars and improved various access tracks to them.

== Flora ==
On its slopes several species of trees can be found, specially pines, common hollies and beeches, and to a lesser extent Valencian oak and Pyrenean oak.
