= Medrano, Spain =

Medrano
- Municipality
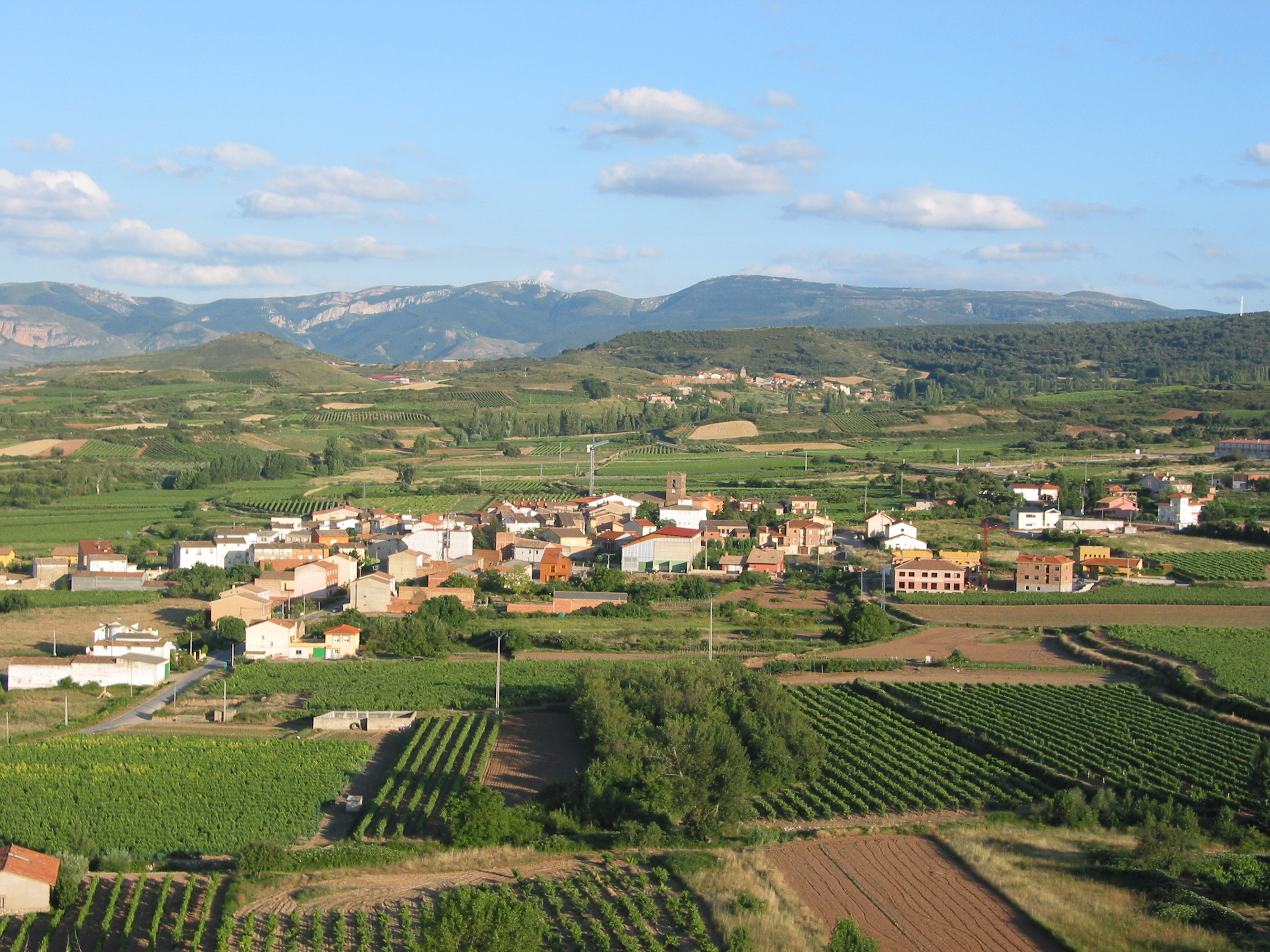
- View of Medrano

- Coat of arms

- Location within La Rioja, Spain Location within Spain
- Country: Spain
- Autonomous community: La Rioja
- Comarca: Logroño

Population
  - Total: 321
- Postal code: 26374

Medrano is a municipality in La Rioja, Spain. It is situated 17 km from the capital Logroño. There are 188 inhabitants and it covers 7.46 km². Its name is derived from the Medrano family.

== See also ==
- List of municipalities in La Rioja
- Medrano (disambiguation)
- Luisa de Medrano
