= Lardero =

- Municipality
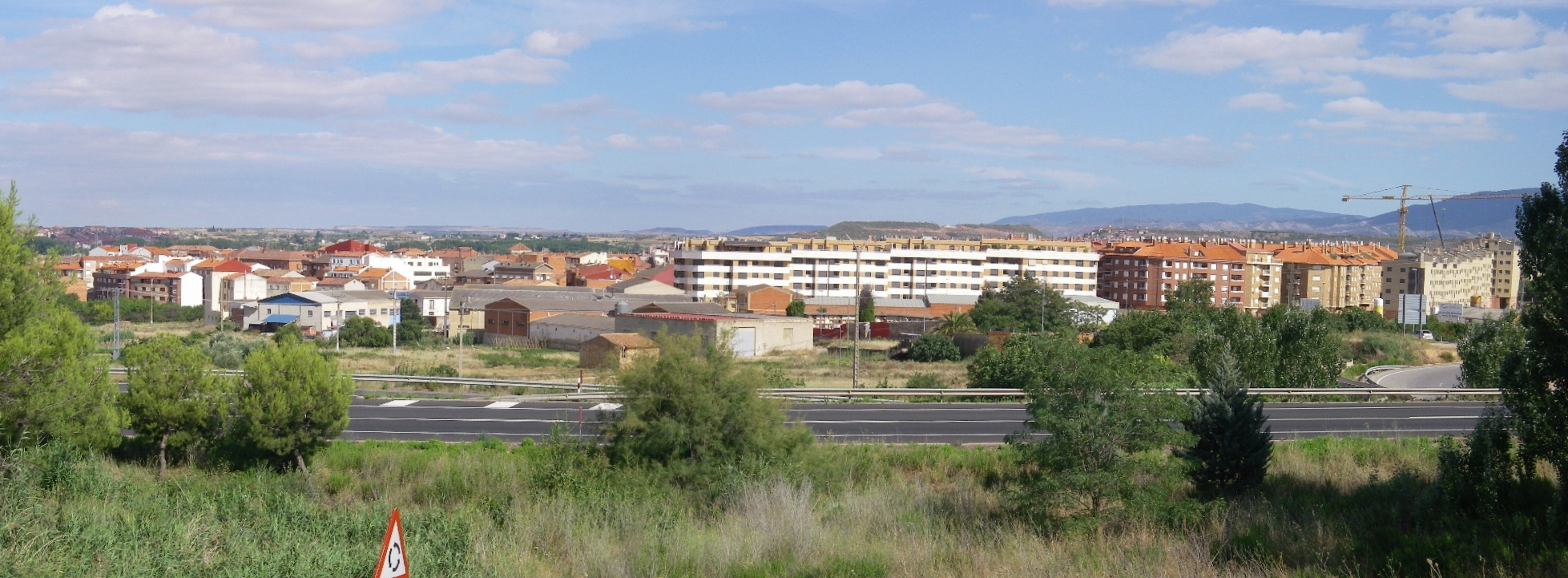
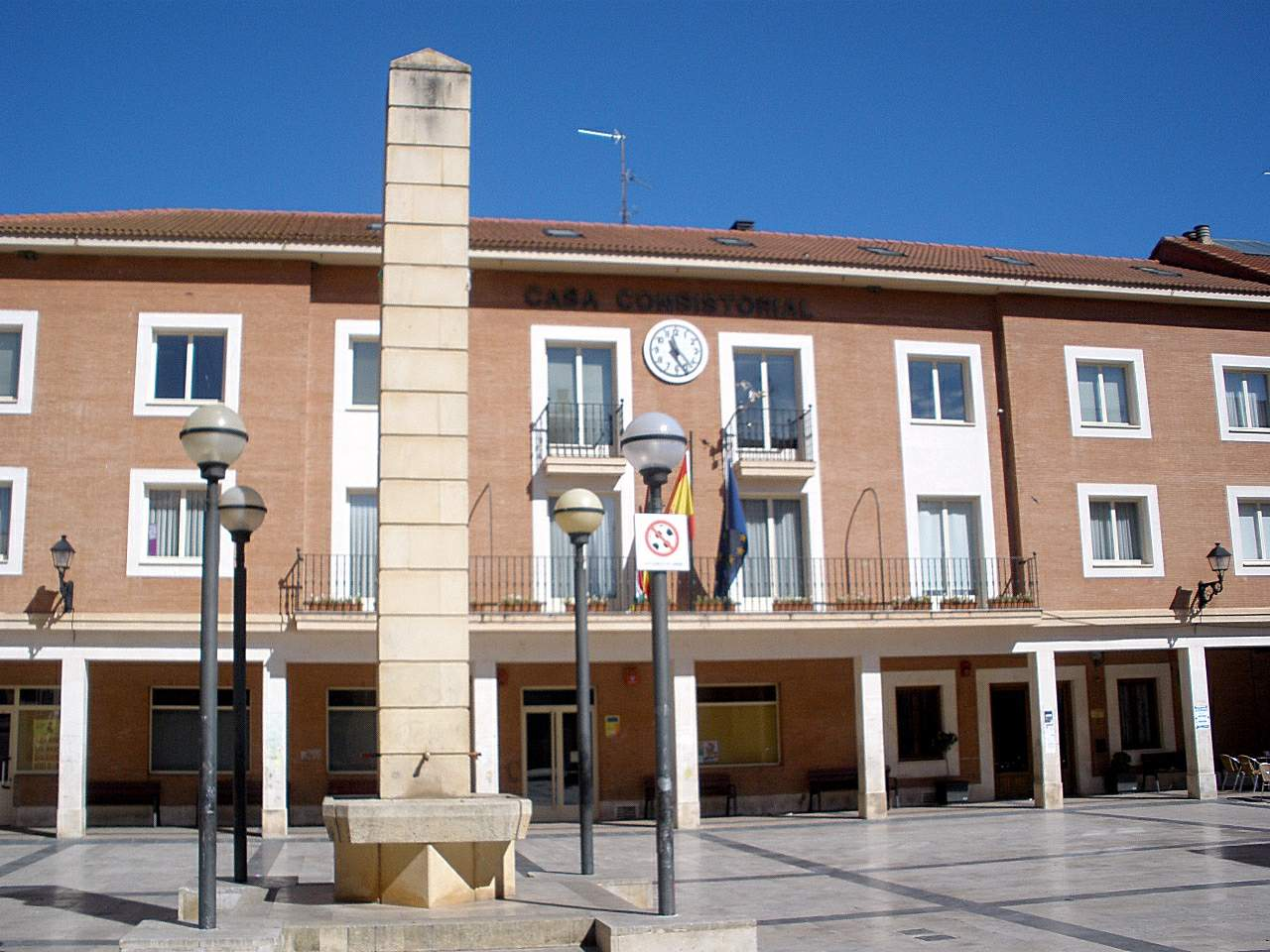
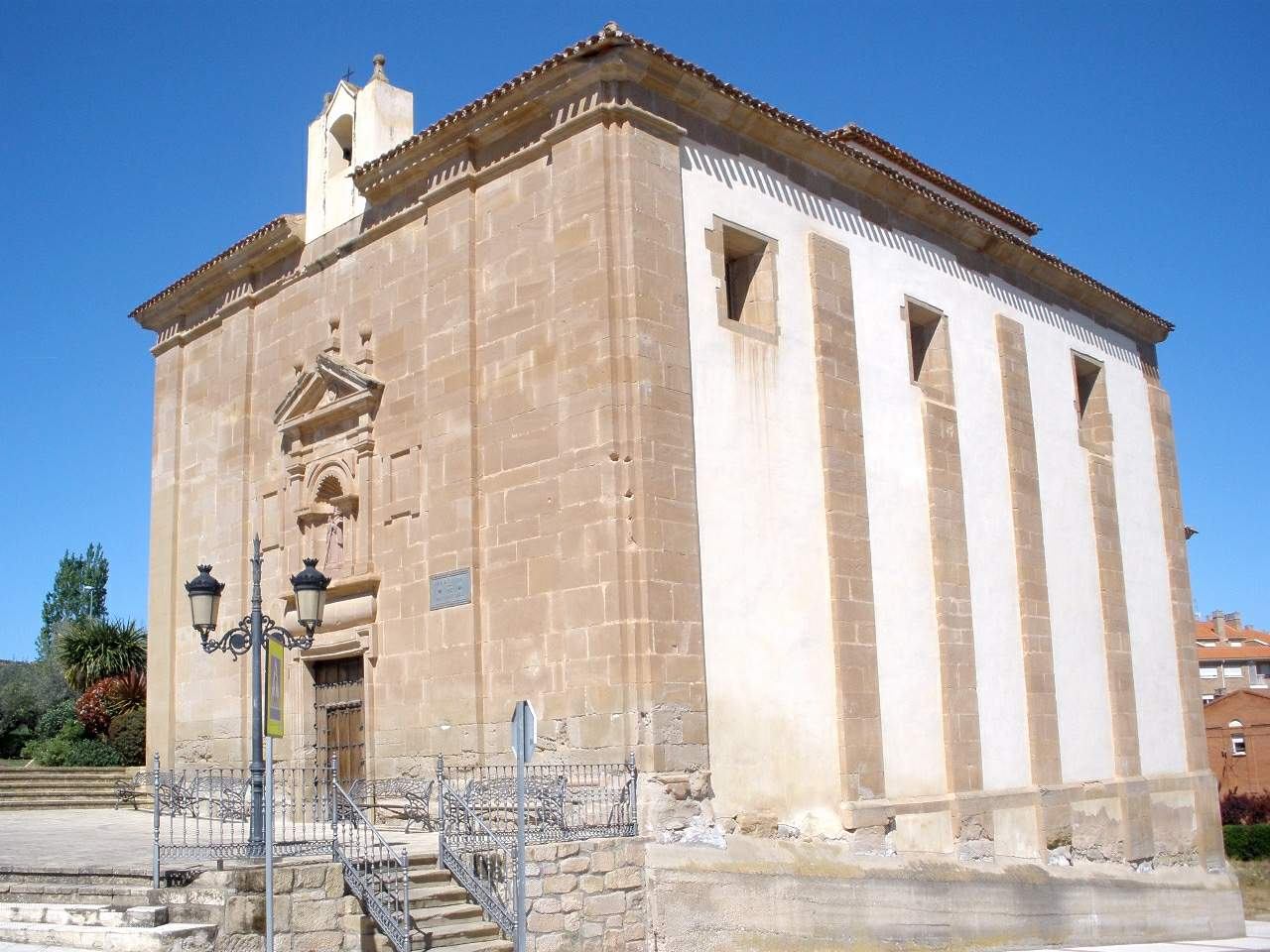
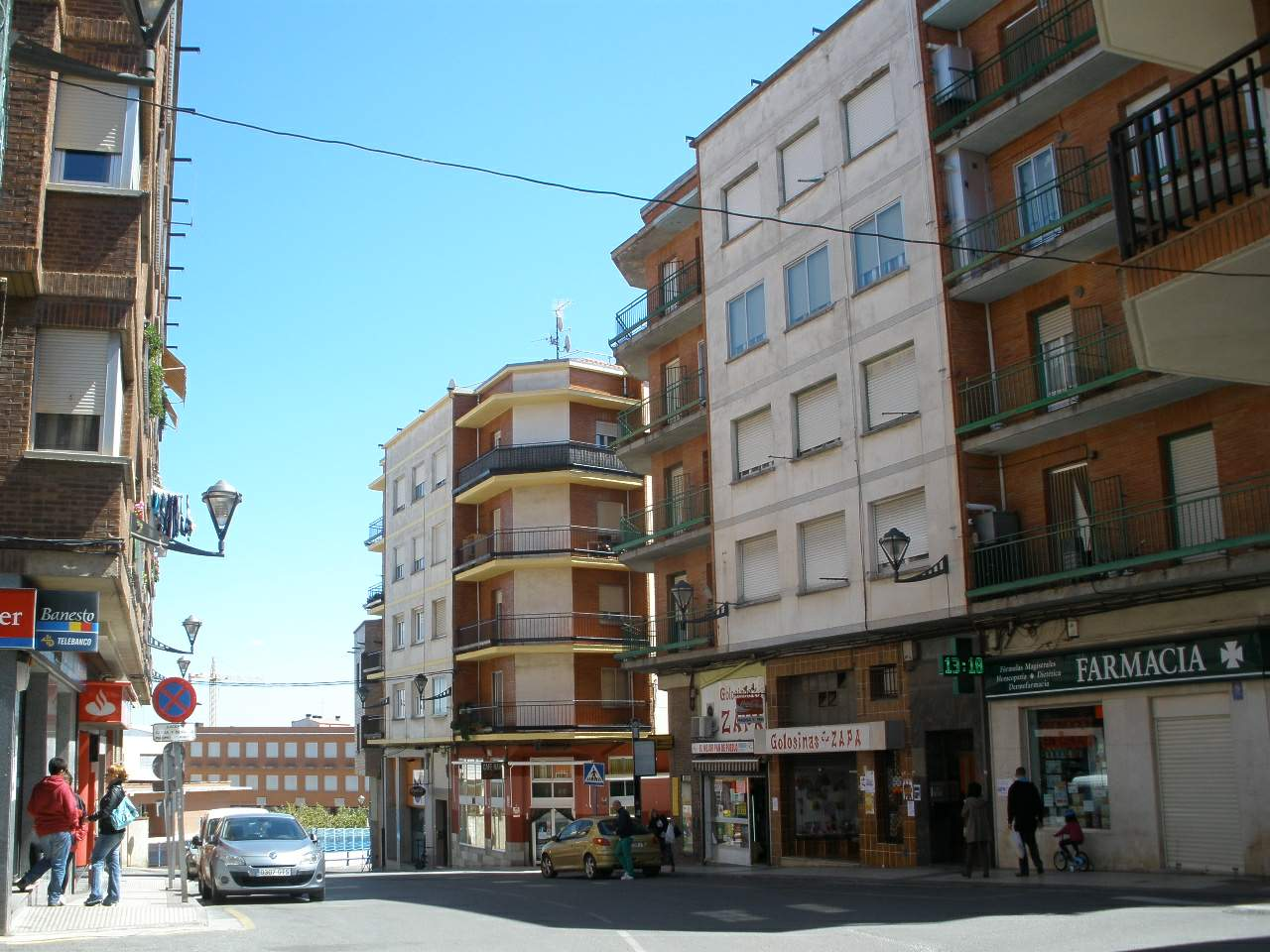
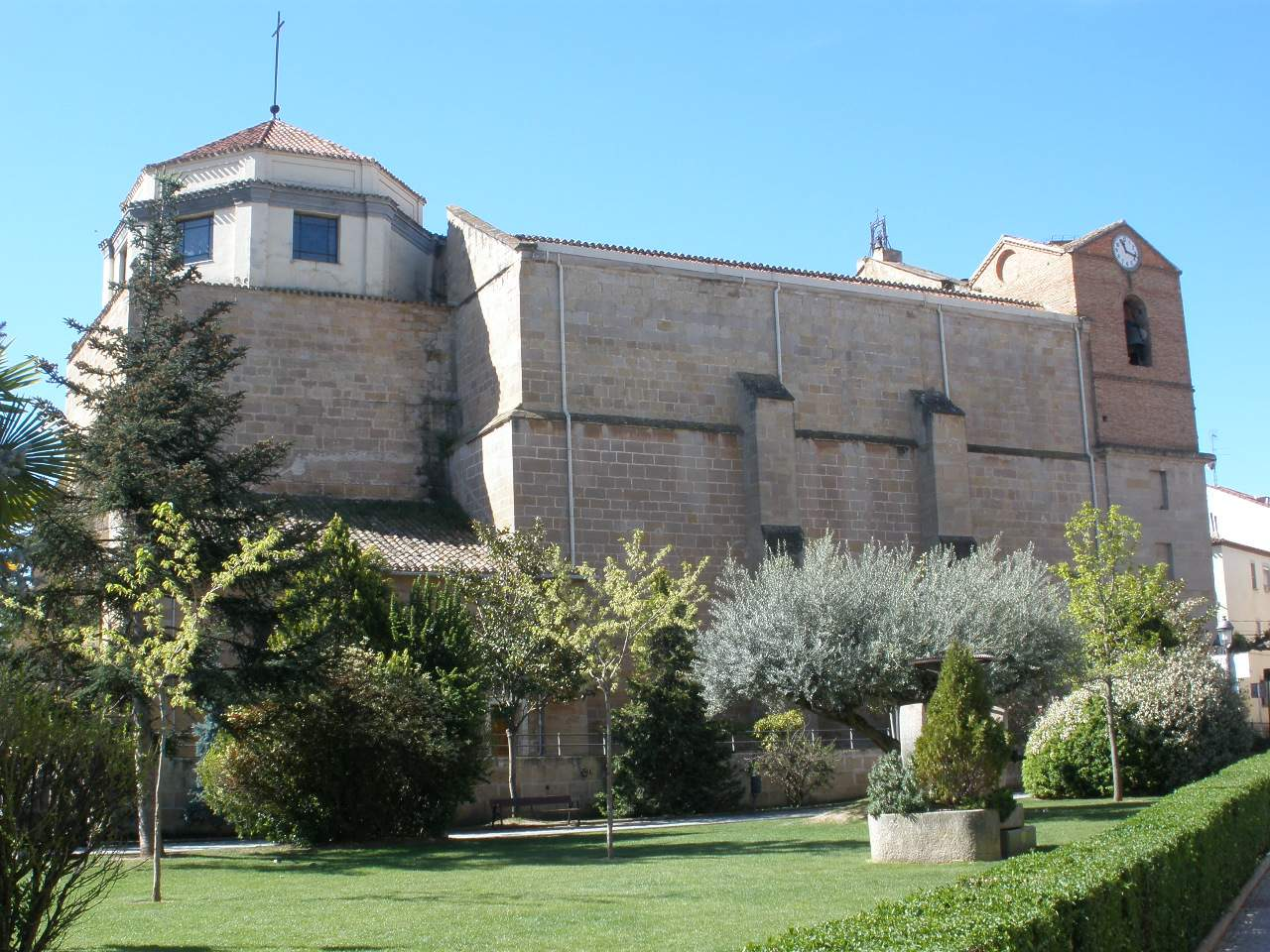
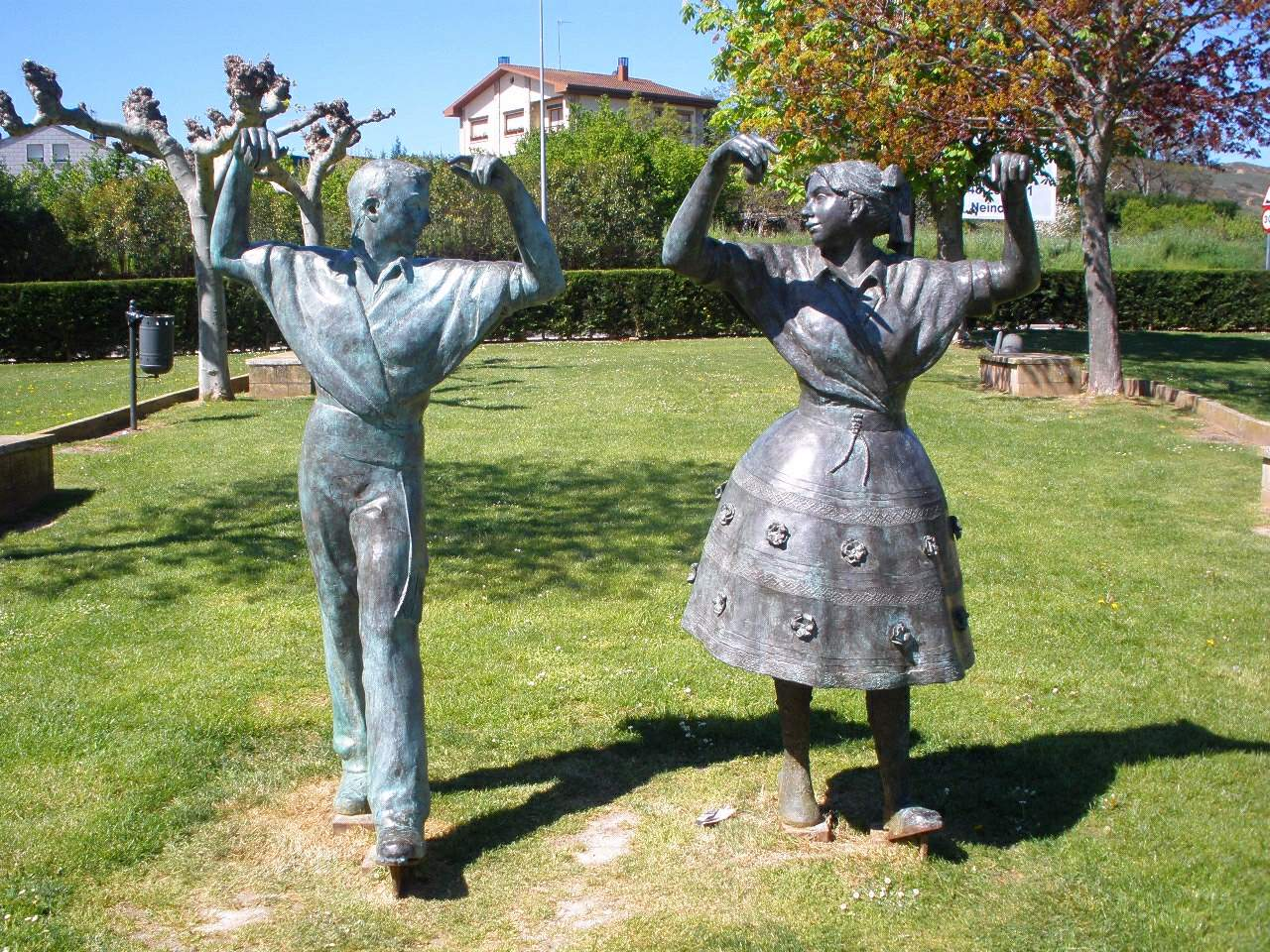
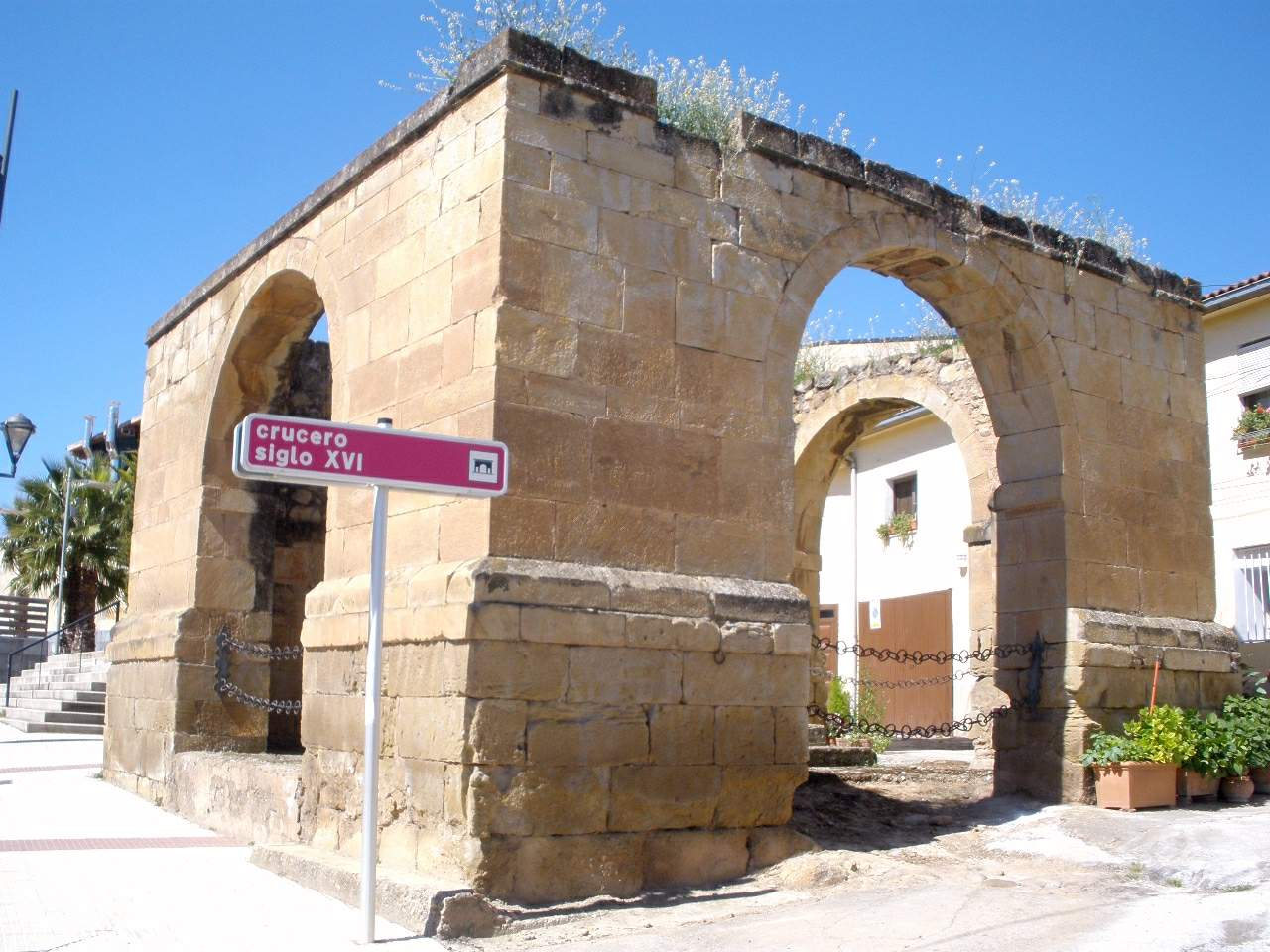
- Lardero

- Coat of arms

- Location in La Rioja Location in Spain
- Coordinates: 42°25′34″N 2°27′41″W
- Country: Spain
- Autonomous Community: La Rioja (Spain)
- Province: La Rioja
- Comarca: Logroño

Government
  - Mayor: José Antonio Elguea Nalda (PP)

Area
  - Total: 20 km^{2} (7.7 sq mi)
- Elevation (AMSL): 438 m (1,437 ft)

Population (2025-01-01)
  - Total: 12,060
  - Density: 600/km^{2} (1,600/sq mi)
- Time zone: UTC+1 (CET)
  - Summer (DST): UTC+2 (CEST (GMT +2))
- Postal code: 32890
- Area code: +34 (Spain) + 941 (La Rioja)
- Website: www.aytolardero.org

Lardero is a village in the province and autonomous community of La Rioja, Spain. The municipality covers an area of 20.36 square kilometres (7.86 sq mi) and as of 2011 had a population of 8438 people.
