= Sojuela =

Municipality in Spain

- Municipality
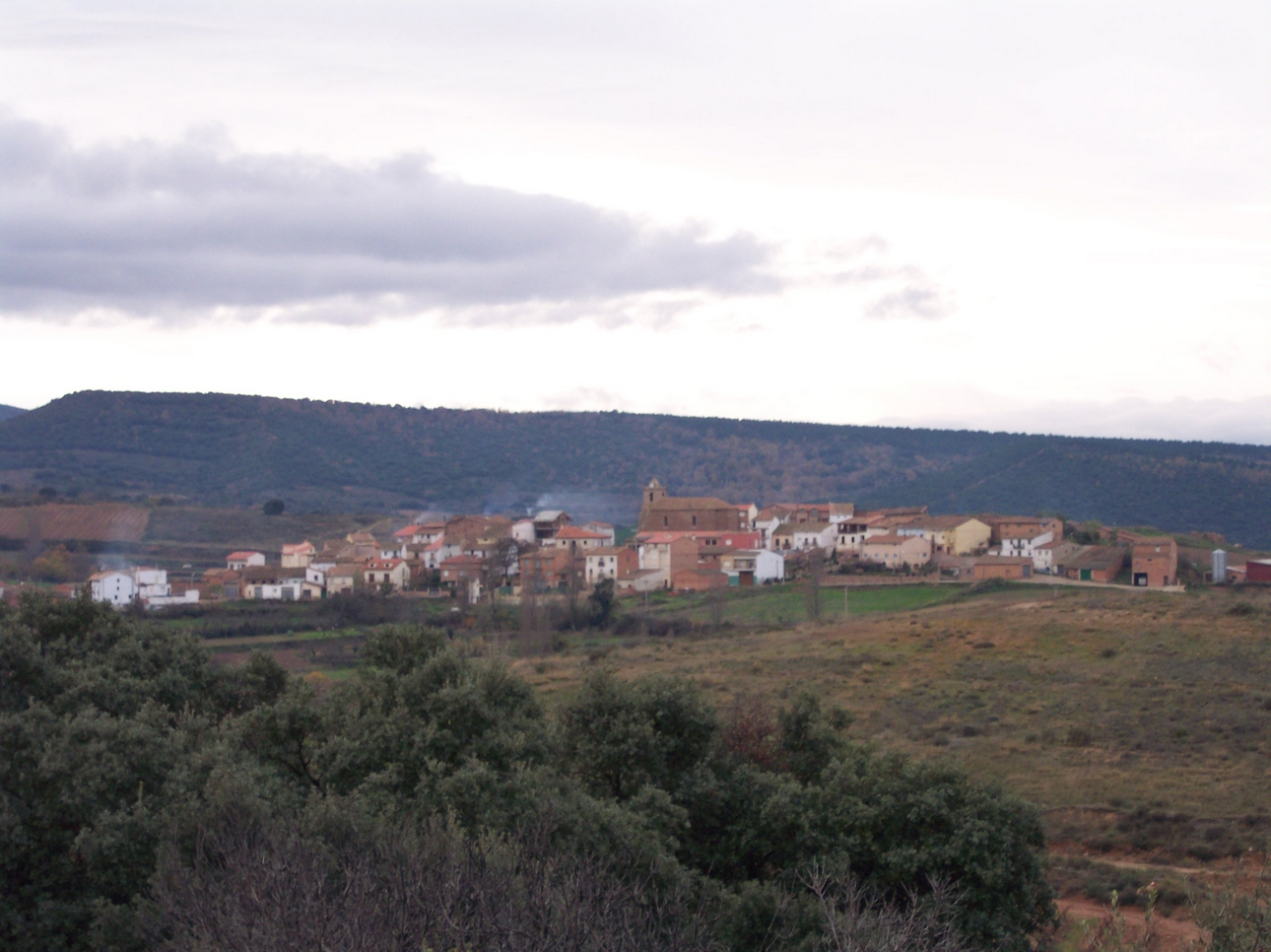

- Location within Rioja Media (La Rioja).

- Location in La Rioja Location in Spain
- Coordinates: 42°22′12″N 2°32′42″W
- Country: Spain
- Autonomous community: La Rioja
- Comarca: Rioja Media

Government
  - Mayor: Mª Milagrosa Díez González (PSOE)

Area
  - Total: 15.15 km^{2} (5.85 sq mi)
- Elevation: 669 m (2,195 ft)

Population (2025-01-01)
  - Total: 690
  - Density: 46/km^{2} (120/sq mi)
- Time zone: UTC+1 (CET)
  - Summer (DST): UTC+2 (CET)
- Website: http://www.sojuela.es
- 15 km to Logroño

Sojuela (Spanish pronunciation: [soˈxwela]) is a municipality of the autonomous community of La Rioja, Spain. It is located near the capital, Logroño. Its population in December 2022 was 570 inhabitants over a 15.15 square kilometre area. It is the first municipality in La Rioja hosting a co-living space.

Sojuela is made up of two sections. There is lots of new housing centred around the golf course, and there is the Pueblo traditionale, which has approximately 36 permanent residents. The village has a bar which is very lively, next to the ayuntamiento. It is in the heart of the wine growing area and boasts two bodegas. More than half of the varieties of the butterflies of Spain can be found in the environs of the village. The Co-living also runs Erasmus programmes. The village is at the foot of Moncalvillo and there are several walking trails in the area.

On weekdays, five buses run in each direction, which includes going round the valley of which Sojuela is part, to Logroño No buses on Sunday and one bus in each direction on Saturday. Additionally, there are buses that run from Entrena which is a 45-minute walk :many more, and they run every day.

== Demographics ==
Historical population

| Year | Pop. | ±% |
|---|---|---|
| 1842 | 310 | — |
| 1857 | 310 | +0.0% |
| 1877 | 276 | −11.0% |
| 1887 | 261 | −5.4% |
| 1900 | 288 | +10.3% |
| 1910 | 260 | −9.7% |
| 1920 | 222 | −14.6% |
| 1930 | 204 | −8.1% |
| 1940 | 213 | +4.4% |

| Year | Pop. | ±% |
|---|---|---|
| 1950 | 243 | +14.1% |
| 1960 | 207 | −14.8% |
| 1970 | 158 | −23.7% |
| 1981 | 113 | −28.5% |
| 1991 | 94 | −16.8% |
| 2001 | 90 | −4.3% |
| 2011 | 256 | +184.4% |
| 2021 | 471 | +84.0% |

Source: National Statistics Institute
