= Hornos de Moncalvillo =

- Municipality
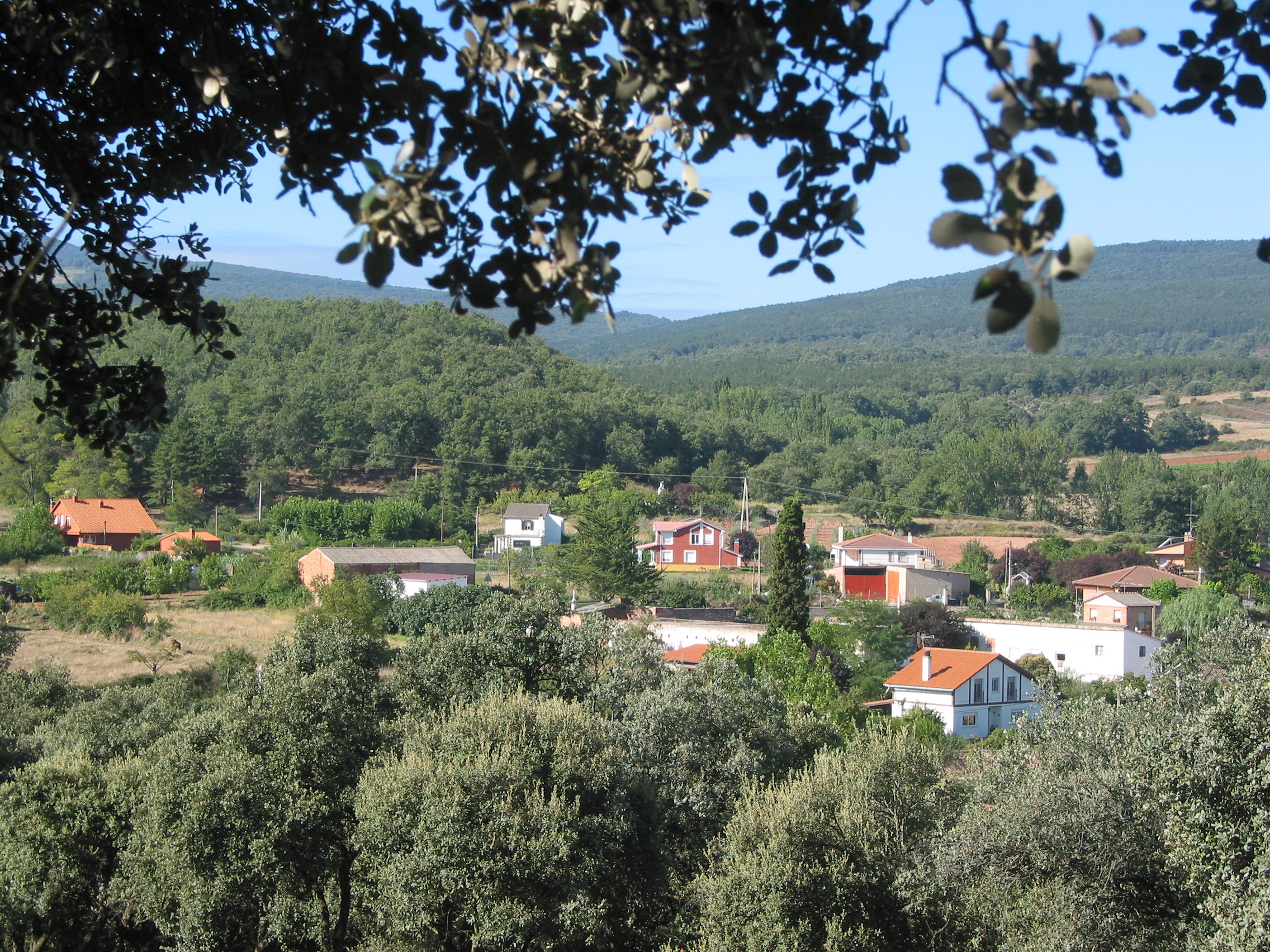
- Skyline of Hornos de Moncalvillo

- Location within La Rioja, Spain Location within Spain
- Coordinates: 42°23′30″N 2°35′06″W
- Country: Spain
- Autonomous community: La Rioja
- Comarca: Logroño

Government
  - Mayor: Antonio Mayoral Cerrolaza (PSOE)

Area
  - Total: 7.40 km^{2} (2.86 sq mi)
- Elevation: 676 m (2,218 ft)

Population (2025-01-01)
  - Total: 92
- Postal code: 26372

Hornos de Moncalvillo is a village in the province and autonomous community of La Rioja, Spain. The municipality covers an area of 7.4 square kilometres (2.9 sq mi) and as of 2011 had a population of 96 people.

== Politics ==
List of mayors since the democratic elections of 1979
Term	Mayor	Political party
1979–1983	Gerardo Ortigosa Mayoral	UCD
1983–1987	Antonio Mayoral Cerrolaza	AP
1987–1991	Antonio Mayoral Cerrolaza	PSOE
1991–1995	Antonio Mayoral Cerrolaza	PSOE
1995–1999	Antonio Mayoral Cerrolaza	PSOE
1999–2003	Antonio Mayoral Cerrolaza	PSOE
2003–2007	Antonio Mayoral Cerrolaza	PSOE
2007–2011	Antonio Mayoral Cerrolaza	PSOE
2011–2015	Antonio Mayoral Cerrolaza	PSOE
2015–2019	Antonio Mayoral Cerrolaza	PSOE
2019–2023	n/d	n/d
2023–	n/d	n/d
