= Comarca de Logroño =

Logroño
- Comarca
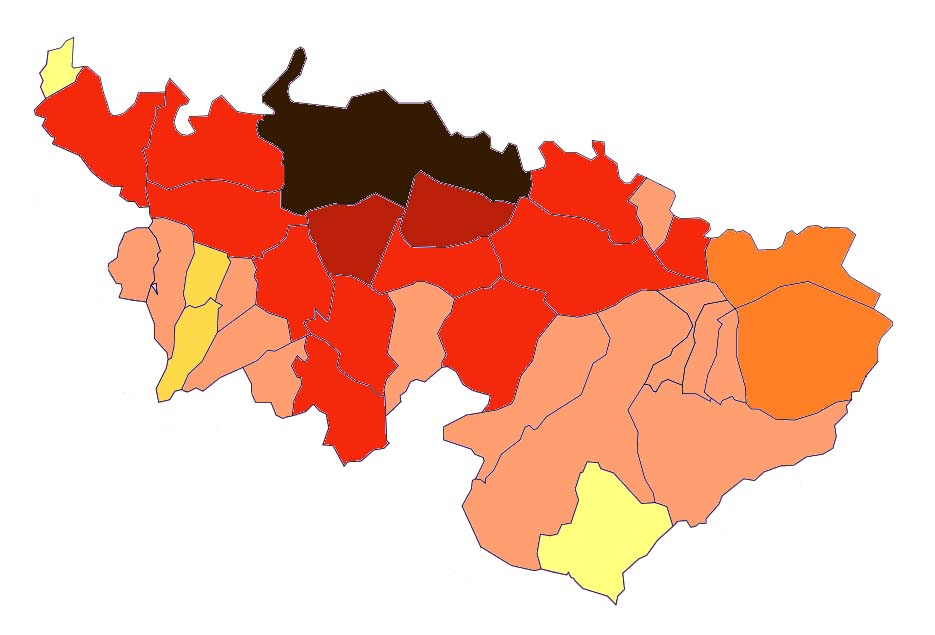
- Interactive map of Logroño
- Coordinates: 42.38259°N 2.421523°W
- Country: Spain

Logroño is a comarca in La Rioja province in Spain.
