= Las Fuentes =

Las Fuentes may refer to:

- Las Fuentes (Mexibús)
- Las Fuentes, Zaragoza
