= Paseo de la Constitución =

Street in Zaragoza, Spain

Coordinates: 41.6478°N 0.8813°W

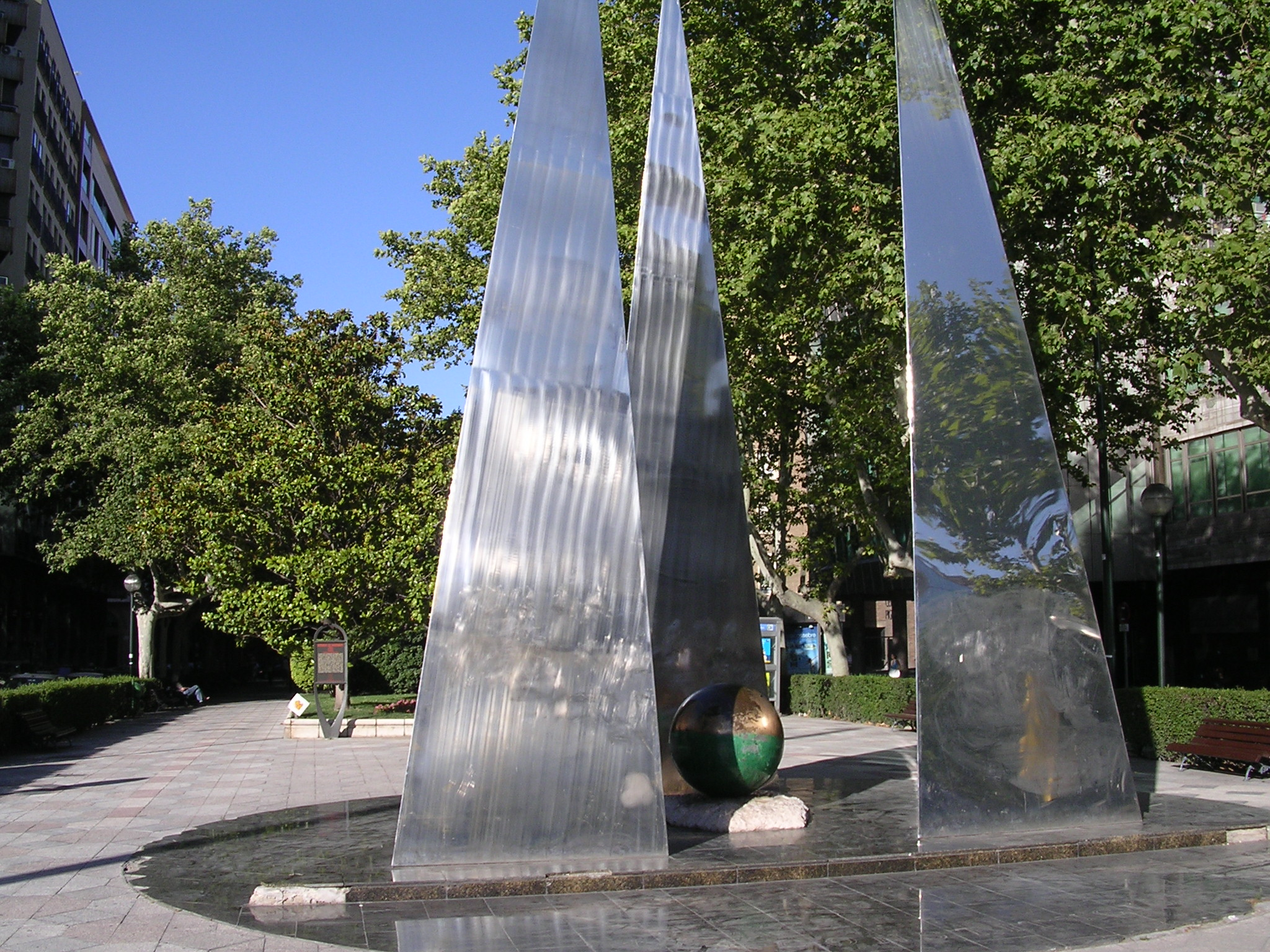
View of el Monumento a la Constitución (Monument to the Constitution), main attraction of namesake plaza, in Saragossa, Spain.

El Paseo de la Constitución (Constitution Walk) is located in Zaragoza, Spain.

== Description and history ==
The street begins in Basilio Paraíso Plaza and ends at Paseo de la Mina. It is one of the most commercial streets of the city, so one can find businesses of all kinds; from luxury dressmaking shops to simple cafés.

In addition, the end of the street is marked by the Monumento a los Sitios. It also passes through el paseo de las Damas and the area of Calle León XIII.

== See also ==
- Las Fuentes, Zaragoza
