= Pastriz =

Coordinates: 41°37′12″N 0°46′55″W

- municipality
- Flag Coat of arms
- Interactive map of Pastriz
- Country: Spain
- Autonomous community: Aragon
- Province: Zaragoza

Area
  - Total: 16 km^{2} (6.2 sq mi)

Population (2025-01-01)
  - Total: 1,316
  - Density: 82/km^{2} (210/sq mi)
- Time zone: UTC+1 (CET)
  - Summer (DST): UTC+2 (CEST)

Pastriz is a municipality located in the province of Zaragoza, Aragon, Spain. According to the 2004 census (INE), the municipality has a population of 1,216 inhabitants.

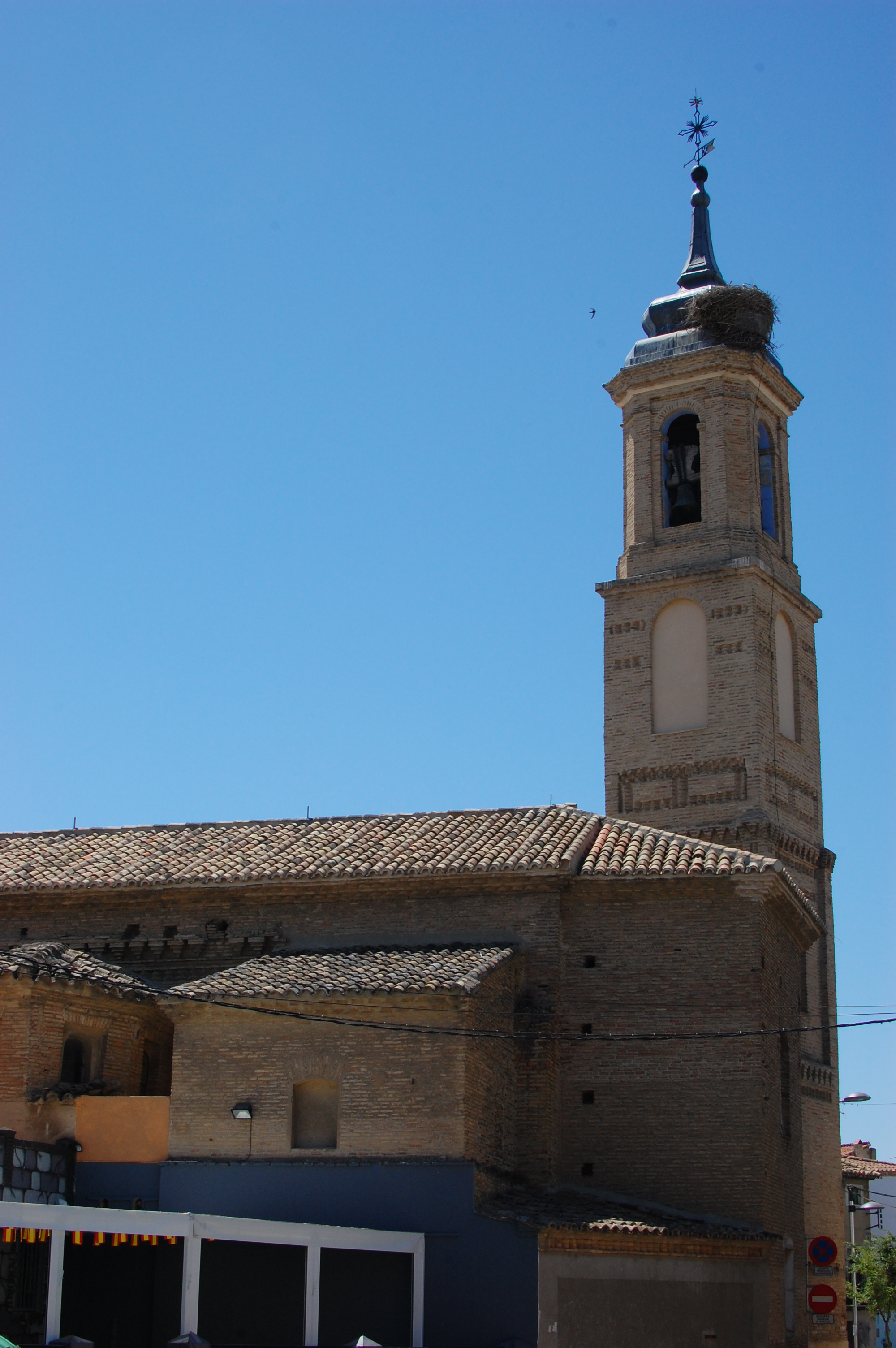
Church of Pastriz

== See also ==
- Las Fuentes, Zaragoza
- List of municipalities in Zaragoza
