= Mediana de Aragón =

Coordinates: 41°28′00″N 0°42′00″W

Mediana de Aragón, Spain
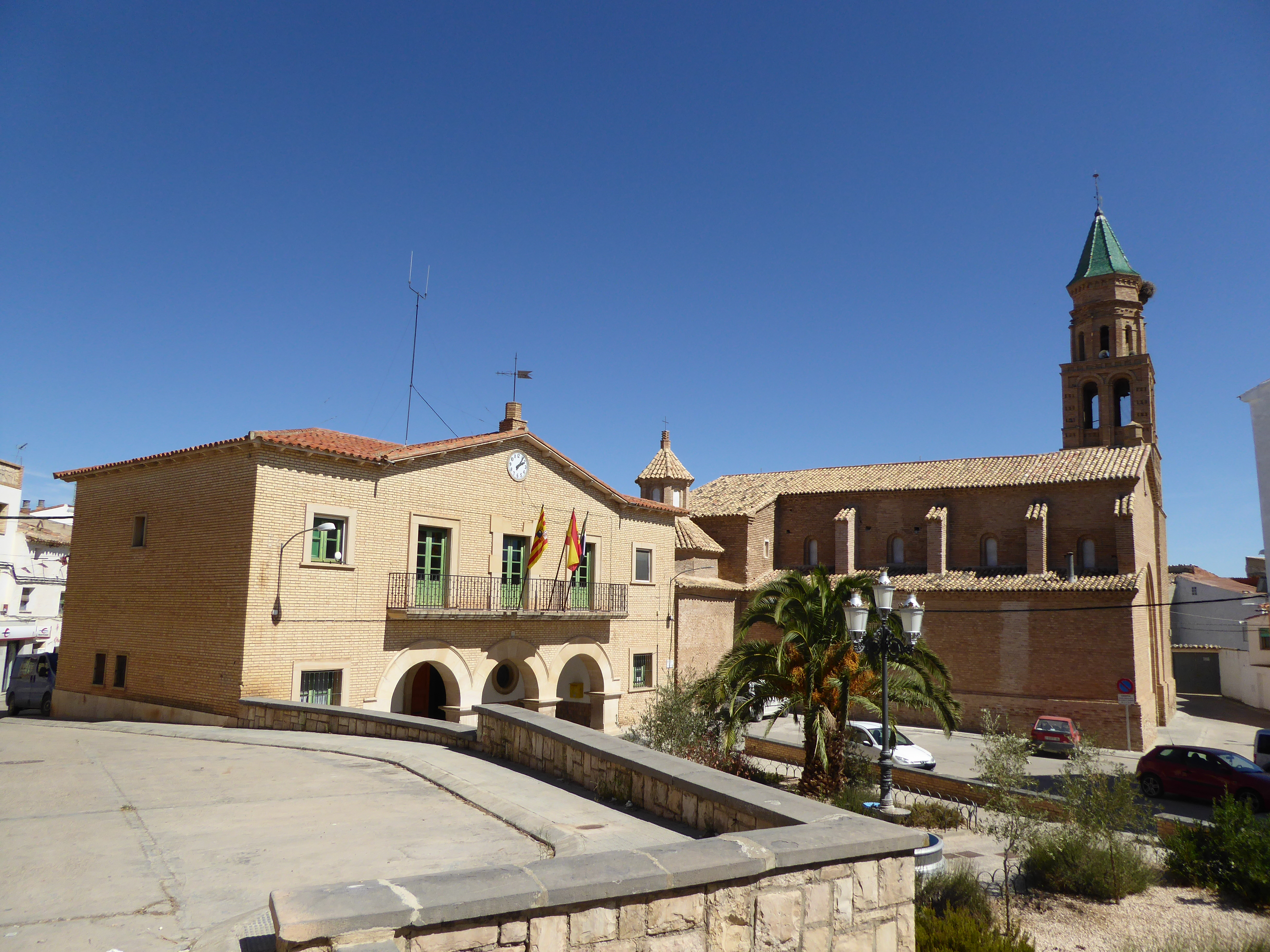

- Flag Coat of arms
- Interactive map of Mediana de Aragón, Spain
- Country: Spain
- Autonomous community: Aragon
- Province: Zaragoza
- Municipality: Mediana de Aragón

Area
  - Total: 90 km^{2} (35 sq mi)
- Elevation: 289 m (948 ft)

Population (2025-01-01)
  - Total: 469
  - Density: 5.2/km^{2} (13/sq mi)
- Time zone: UTC+1 (CET)
  - Summer (DST): UTC+2 (CEST)

Mediana de Aragón is a municipality located in the province of Zaragoza, Aragon, Spain. According to the 2004 census (INE), the municipality has a population of 504 inhabitants.

== See also ==
- Las Fuentes, Zaragoza
- List of municipalities in Zaragoza
