= Las Fuentes, Zaragoza =

District of Zaragoza, Spain

Las Fuentes
- District
- Location of Las Fuentes (in red) in Zaragoza

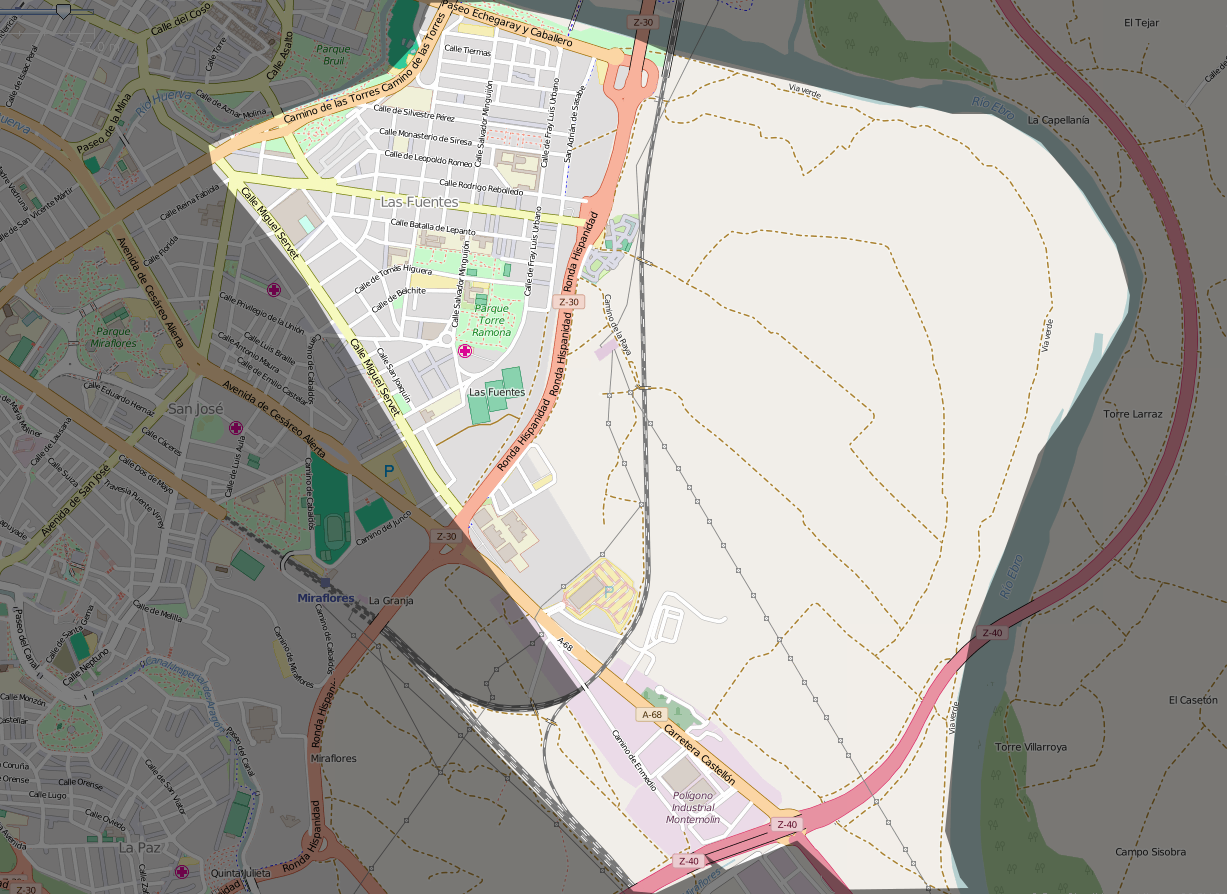
- Map of the district.
- Country: Spain
- Autonomous community: Aragon
- Province: Province of Zaragoza
- City: Zaragoza
- Boroughs: Subdivision: Las Fuentes, Bajo Aragón (Montemolín)
  - Mayor: (PSOE)

Area
  - Total: 631 km^{2} (244 sq mi)

Population (2015)
  - Total: 42,610
  - Density: 6,748/km^{2} (17,480/sq mi)

Las Fuentes (in Aragonese: Las Fuents) is a district of Zaragoza (Spain). It borders the districts of Casco Antiguo, Torrero - La Paz and San José and the municipalities of Pastriz, El Burgo de Ebro, Fuentes de Ebro and Mediana de Aragón. In addition to the neighborhood of Las Fuentes, it includes others such as Montemolín (also called Bajo Aragón) or the area surrounding the Pabellón Príncipe Felipe. It extends as far as the neighborhood of La Cartuja. Its borders are delimited by the rivers Ebro and Huerva, Miguel Servet Street and the railway bypass.

It is governed by a Municipal Board.

== History ==
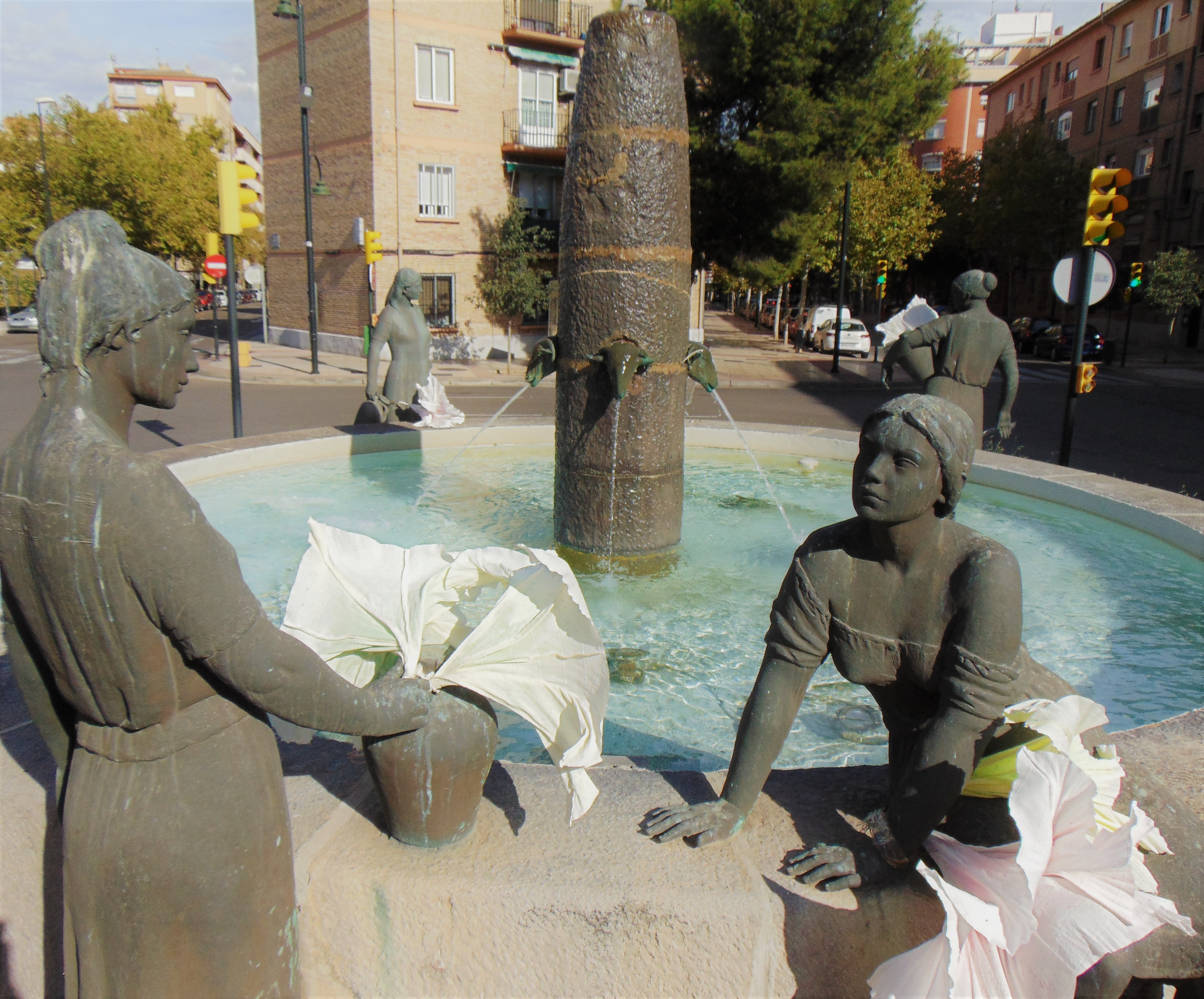
Fuente de las aguadoras on Compromiso de Caspe Avenue

The name of the neighborhood comes from the many springs and lagoons that were formed in this area due to the flooding of the Ebro and Huerva rivers.

In 1885 the Municipal Slaughterhouse was built and the first houses were built around it, and later the Utrillas Railway Station was inaugurated (now converted into a shopping center).

In 1950 the first consolidated nuclei began to settle around Hogar Obrero and Rusiñol streets. Later, in the 1960s and 1970s, the neighborhood grew due to the arrival of numerous emigrants from Bajo Aragón, which earned it the nickname of Montemolín neighborhood. The neighborhood benefited from the urban development interests of Manuel Escoriaza y Fabro, who in addition to owning plots of land in the area, owned the Zaragoza tramways, which led him to support lines to the district. This history of a working class neighborhood has traditionally defined its character and its vote tends to be mostly for left-wing candidates.

On December 11, 1973, on the first floor of numbers 41, 43 and 45 of Rodrigo Rebolledo Street, where the Bonafonte Brothers' upholstery industry was located, 23 people died in a fire. The tragedy, attributed to failures in the transformer, provoked an intense neighborhood movement that resulted in a demonstration protesting the safety conditions in small industries, the first authorized demonstration in pre-democratic Zaragoza.

More recently, the urbanization of the surroundings of the Torre Ramona Park and the surroundings of the Pabellón Príncipe Felipe, still incomplete, took place. The expansion of the Faculty of Veterinary Medicine of Zaragoza and the plans to reform the sector supported by the Horticulture Exhibition of 2014.

== Infrastructures and services ==
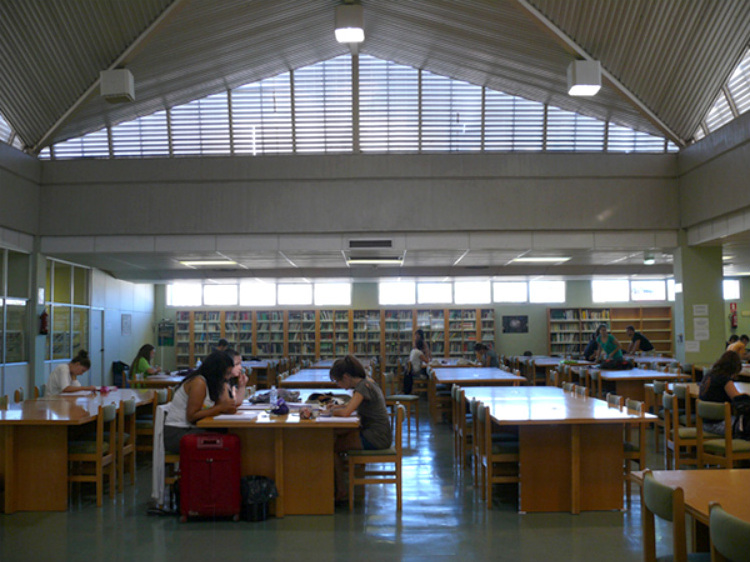
Library of the Faculty of Veterinary Medicine

Compromiso de Caspe Street is the main street in the district. It is also worth mentioning Miguel Servet Street. Both are originated at the confluence of Camino de las Torres and Paseo de la Constitución, being their main roads towards the center of the city. The Plaza de Utrillas, a former railway station now converted into a shopping center, is one of the main centers of commerce and centrality in the district.

Also noteworthy is the Puente de la Unión (popularly known as Puente de Las Fuentes), which allows communication with another district (Margen Izquierda). From the district it is also possible to cross the Ebro through the Weir Footbridge, built during Expo 2008, and the Manuel Giménez Abad Bridge, of the Z-30. Parallel to the latter is the Railway Bridge of the Ebro river in Zaragoza. The Z-40 also crosses the district, separating the neighborhood of La Cartuja from the rest and crossing the Ebro on a bridge of its own. The Bicentennial Footbridge was also built in La Cartuja during the Expo.

The most important green area in the district is the Torre Ramona Park, which is next to the school of the same name. There are also landscaped extensions on the banks of the rivers Ebro (introduced by the Riverside Plan accompanying Expo 2008) and Huerva (Huerva Linear Park, Bruil Park).

It has Las Fuentes Stadium and the Alberto Maestro Municipal Sports Center.

In September 2018, the first Juventus supporters' club in Spain opened its doors: Juventus Club España and on February 19 of the following year it was inaugurated by the former Bianconeri player, Moreno Torricelli.

Of the educational offer it is worth mentioning that it is in this district where the Veterinary School of Zaragoza is located.

As for transportation, the main AUZSA lines are the 22, 24 and 30, which connect it to the center and the University and Delicias Districts, the 44, which is the one that connects with the Margen Izquierda in a similar way to the circular lines, and lines 51, 52 and 25, which cross the city towards the center and then go to the Zaragoza-Delicias Intermodal Station. The 25 is the only line that connects La Cartuja.

=== Municipal Slaughterhouse ===
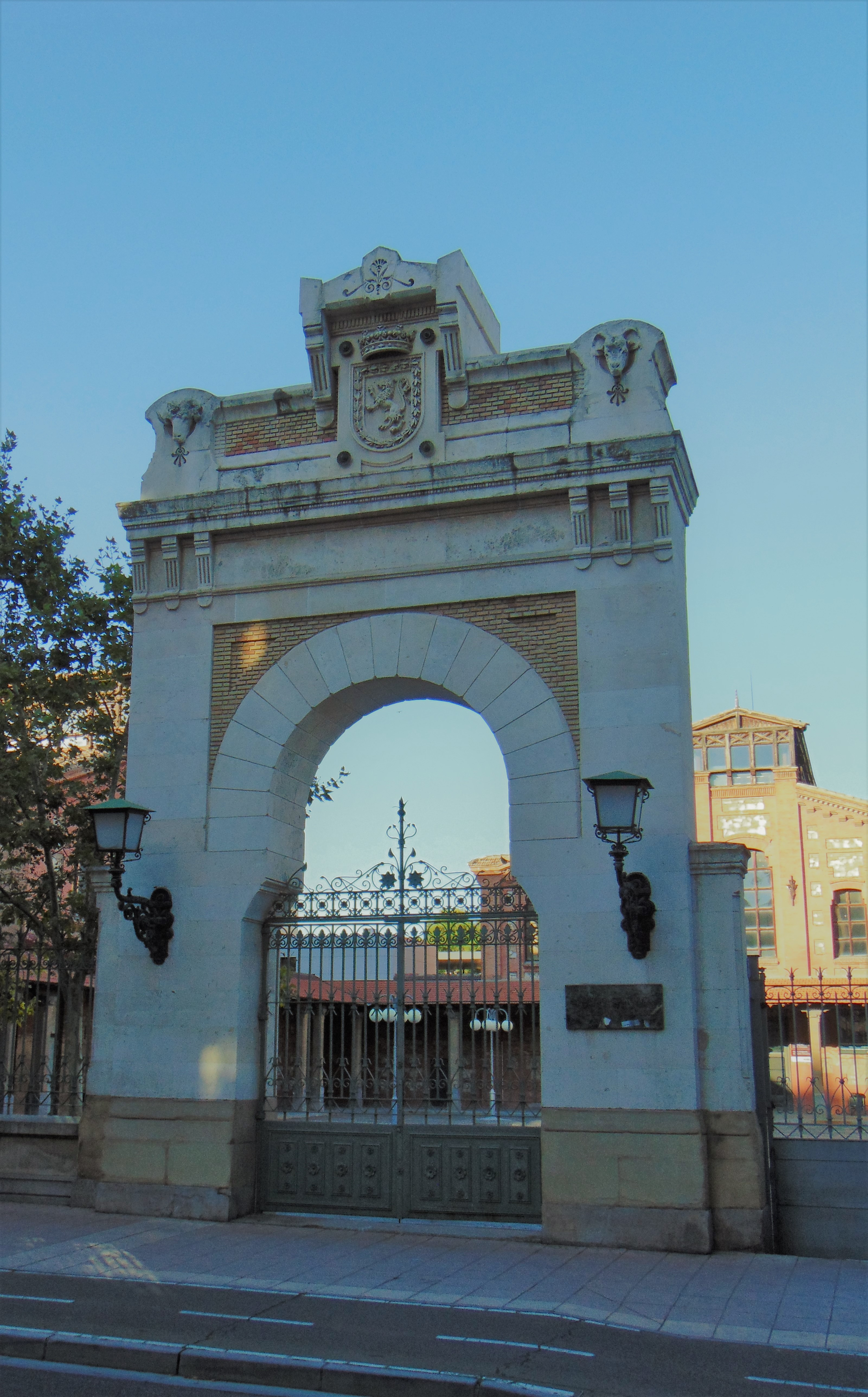

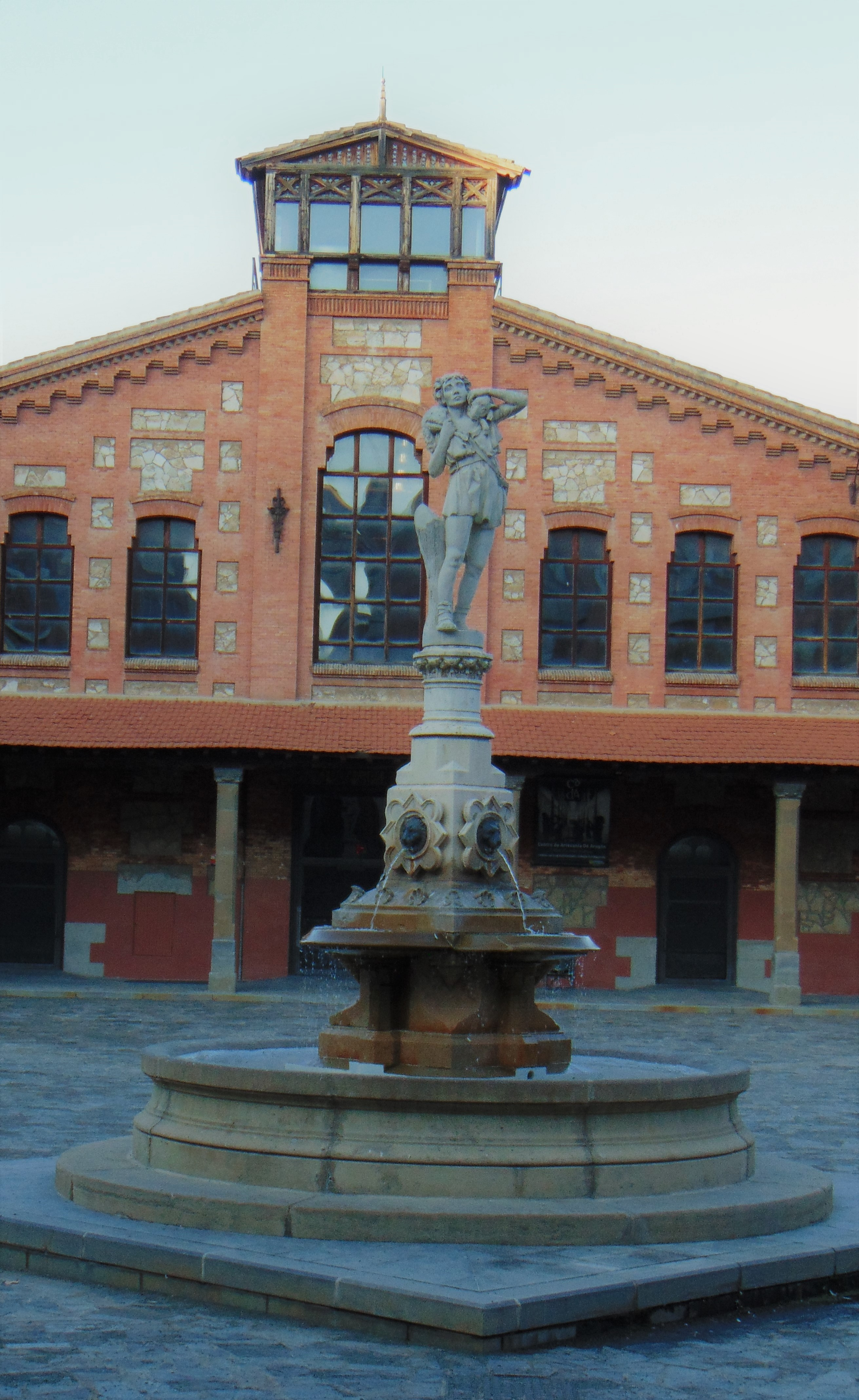
Buen Pastor Fountain

This multiple building of 25,000 square meters, which attracted the first residents of the neighborhood, became in the 90's the space that defines the participatory personality of the residents of Las Fuentes.

Work began in 1880 under the direction of the municipal architect Ricardo Magdalena, at number 57 of what is now Miguel Servet Avenue. A location considered ideal at that time, since it was close to the city, but at the same time isolated by the natural boundaries of the Ebro and Huerva rivers, which in turn facilitated drainage. The first population centers were formed around it.

Its inauguration in 1885 coincided with the II Aragonese Exhibition of Agricultural Products, Industry and Arts, organized by the Economic Society of Friends of the Country.

The Slaughterhouse, built mainly of red brick and in a functional modernist style, consists of three warehouses, where the slaughtering and airing of cattle took place, and a central courtyard for the distribution of the products. Each pavilion had its own washing place for the offal. In the center of the courtyard was the fountain of the Buen Pastor, by Dionisio Lasuén. today placed again in that place, after having been placed in Paseo de la Constitución in the capital city of Maña.

After falling into disuse for years, this immense urban surface was largely used as a sculpture workshop by the Pablo Gargallo Association. As of 2020, it is known as the Salvador Allende Cultural Center.

The building on the right has been completely renovated by the architect Ricardo Usón. Since February 1991 it has housed the Ricardo Magdalena Public Library. The left nave houses the Cantalobos Leisure Center, for children from 6 to 14 years of age.

Entering through Florencio Ballesteros Street is the La Piraña nursery school and a little further along the street is the Senior Citizen Center and the Youth House, opened in November 1990. Two years later, in June 1992, the first issue of Contra Corriente magazine was published.

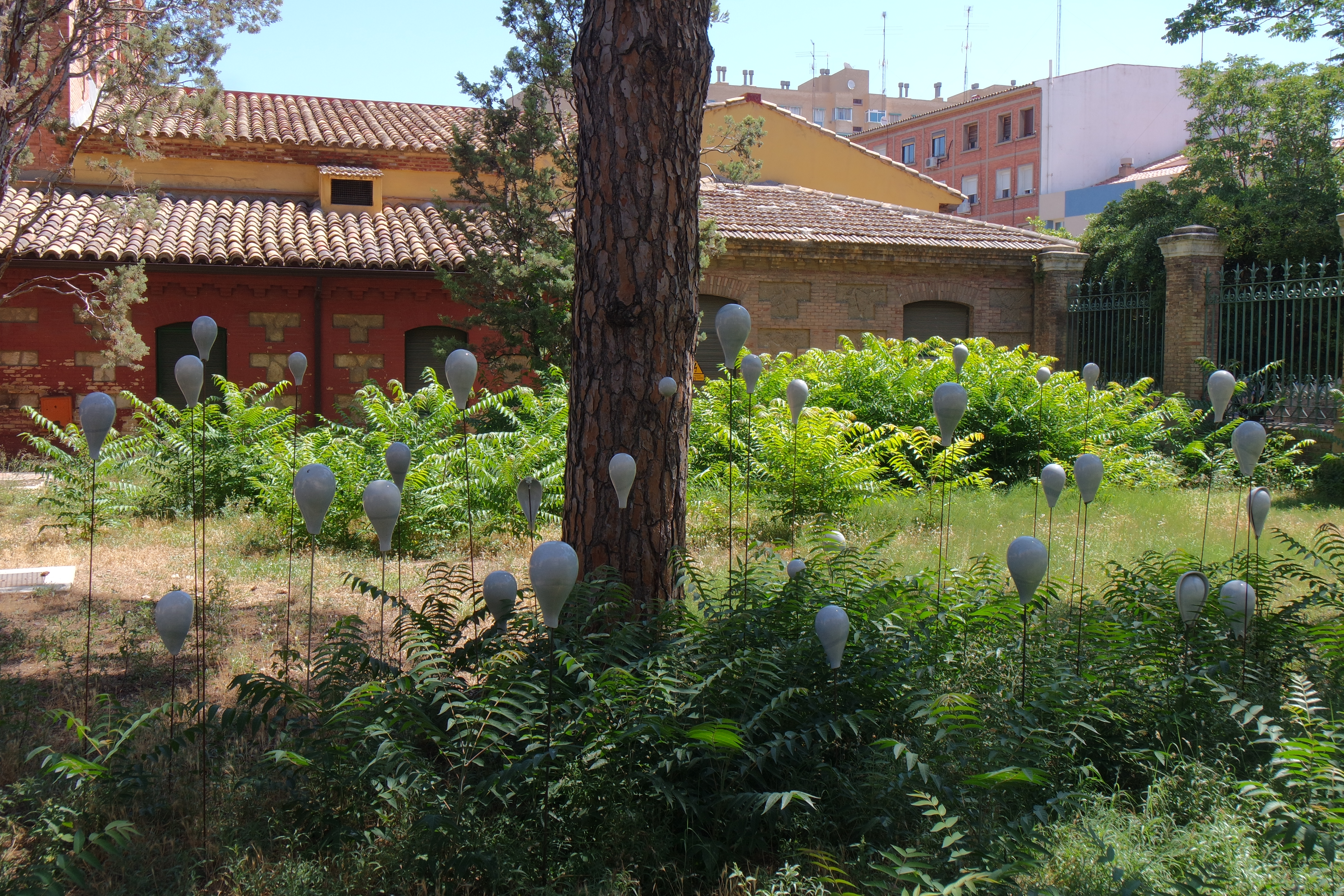
Agua Pasada by Anastacia Jouk

== Gallery ==
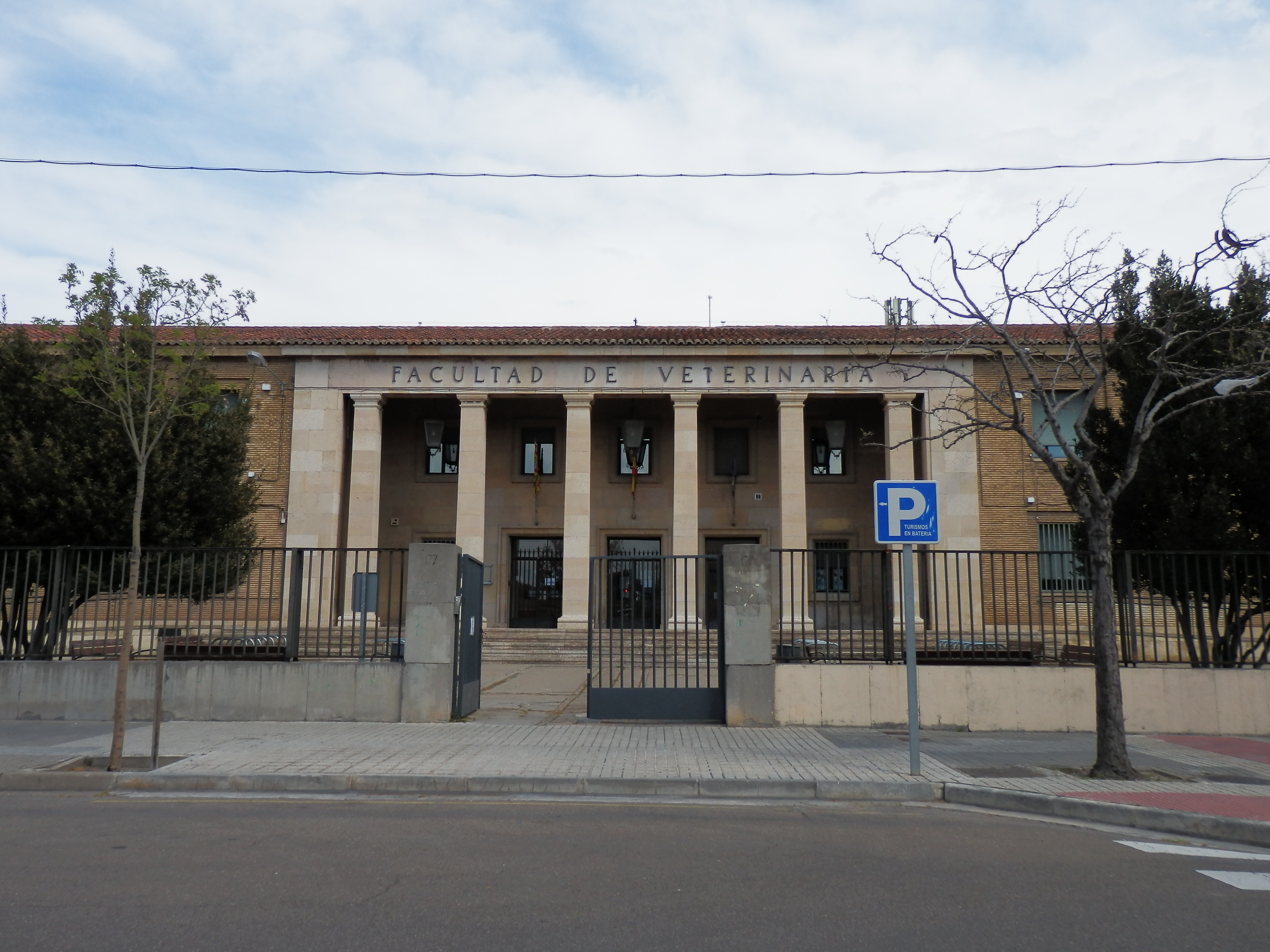
Faculty of Veterinary Medicine

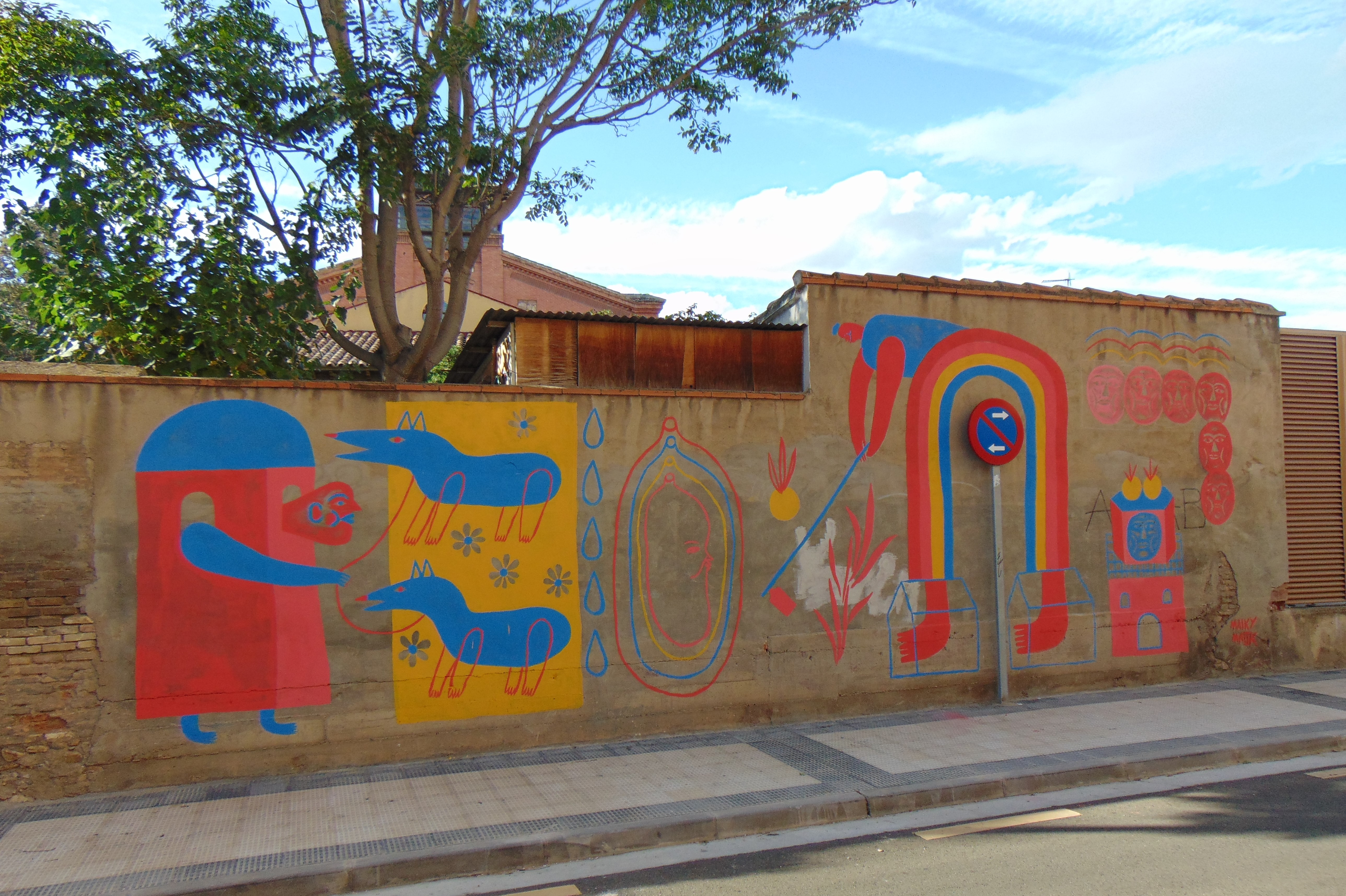
Work by Maiky Maik (Festival Asalto 2019)

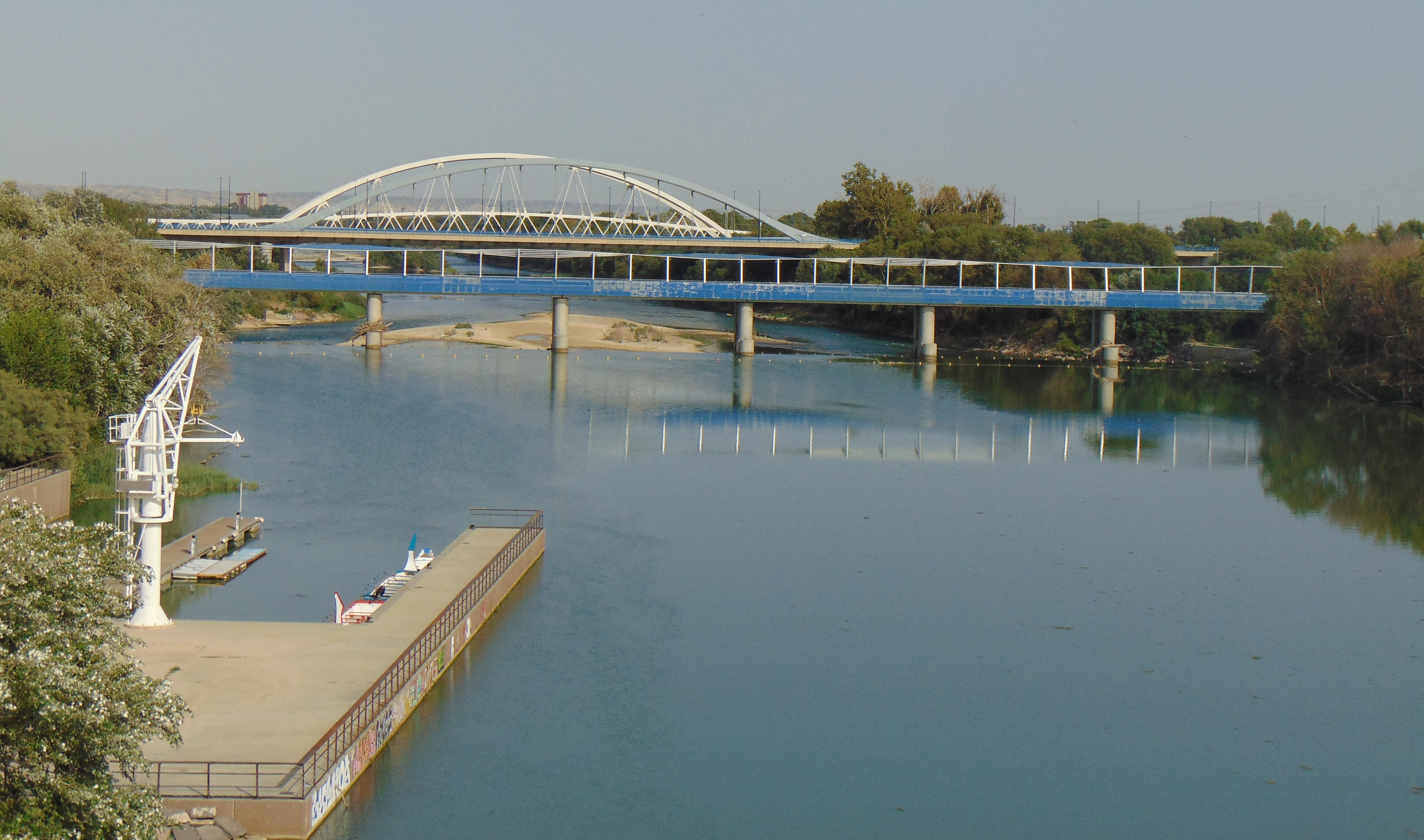
View from the bridge of La Unión del Azud and the Giménez Abad bridge

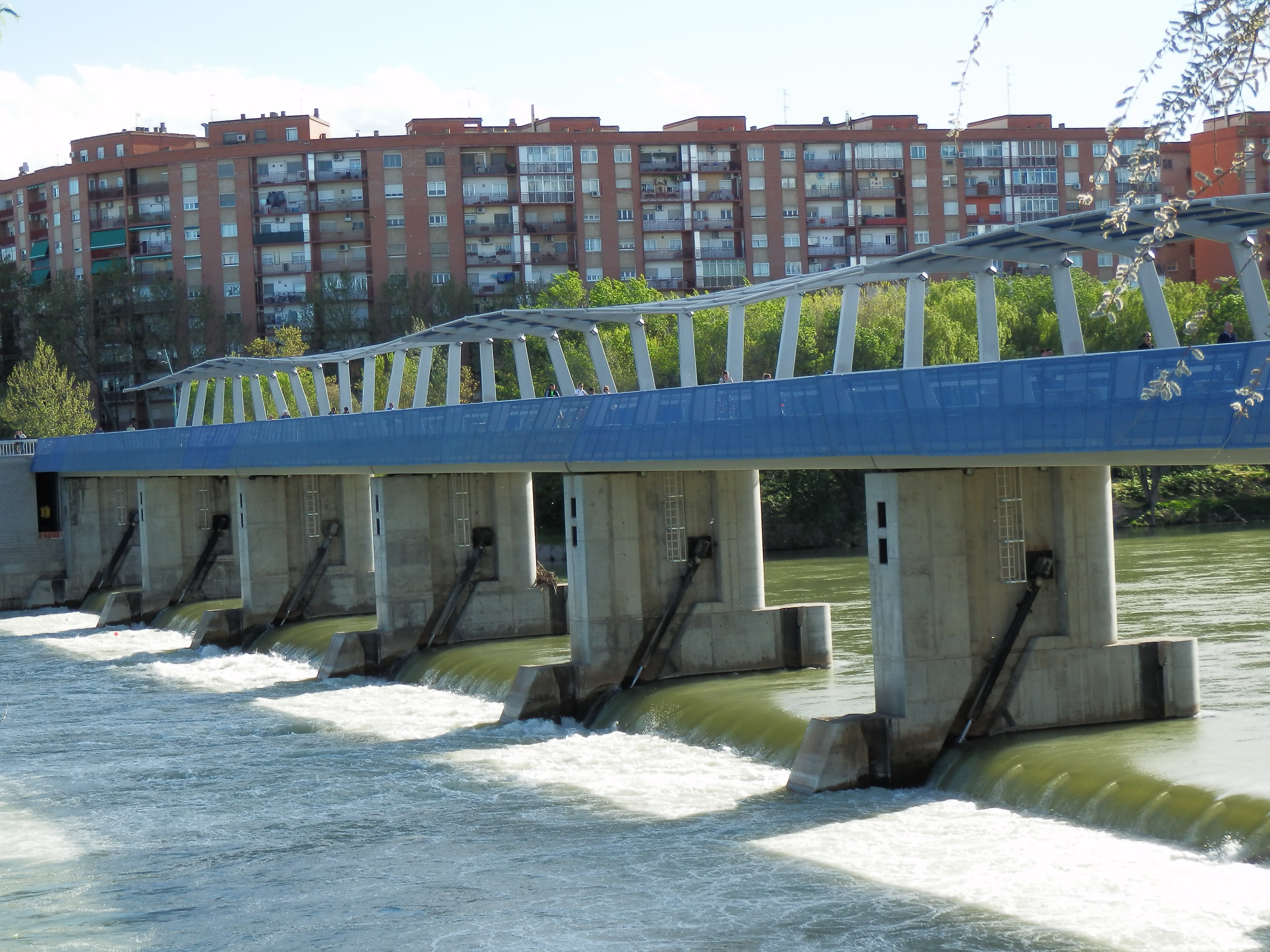
Manuel Lorenzo Pardo Weir

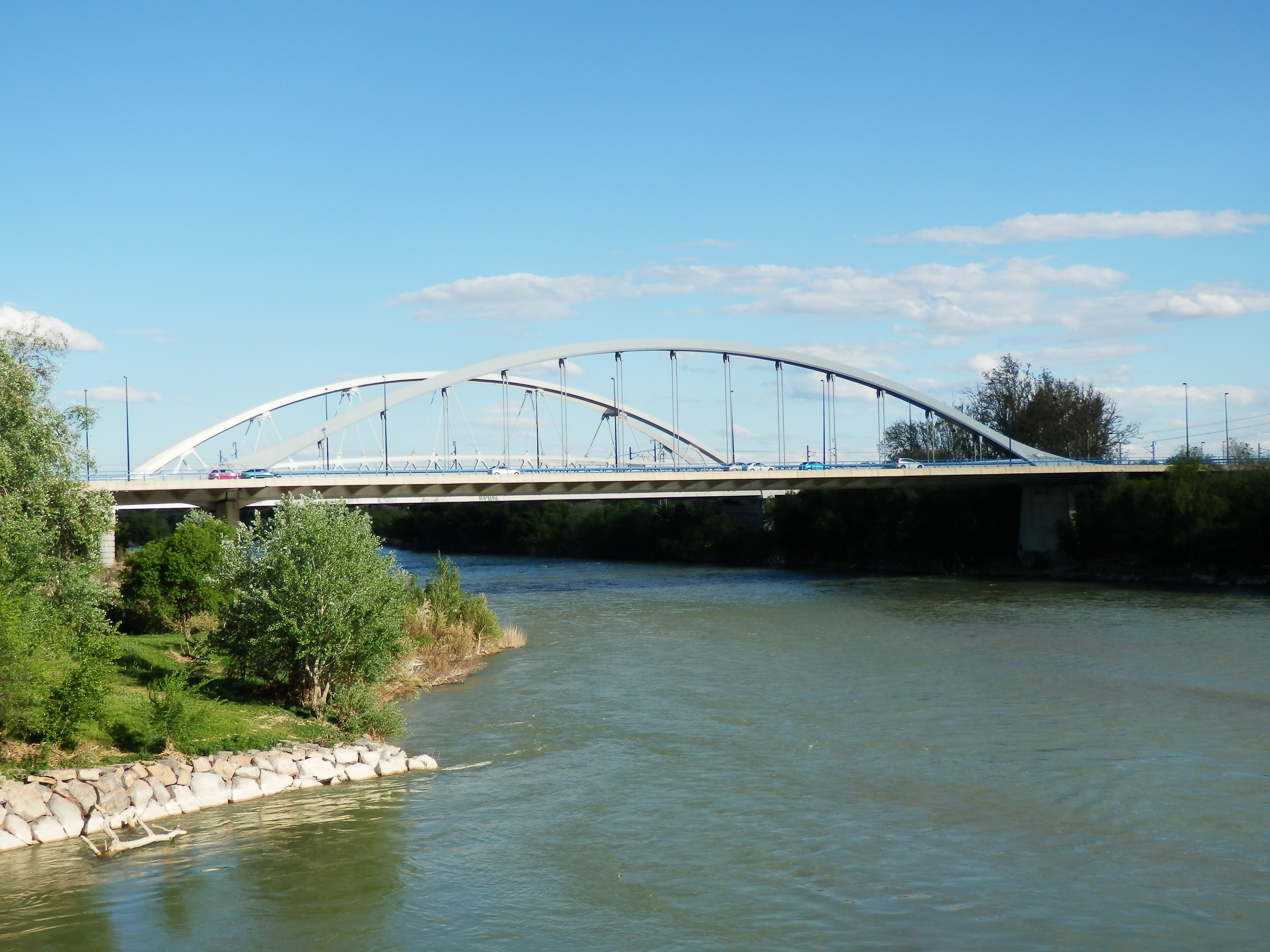
Manuel Giménez Abad Bridge

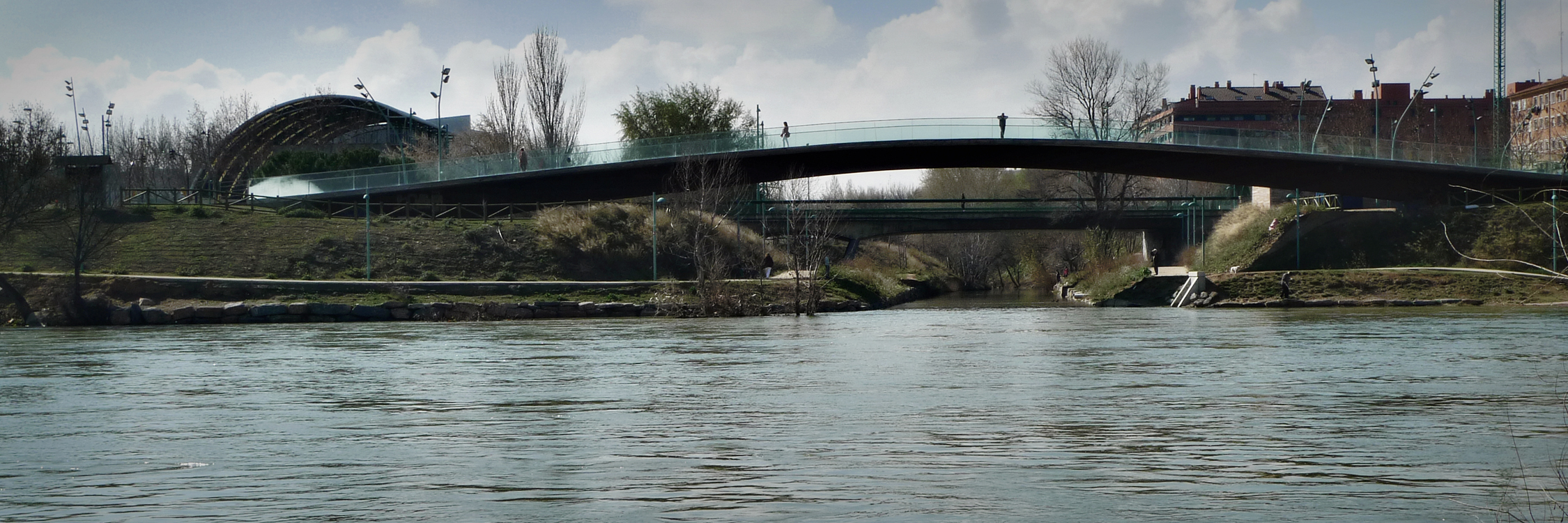

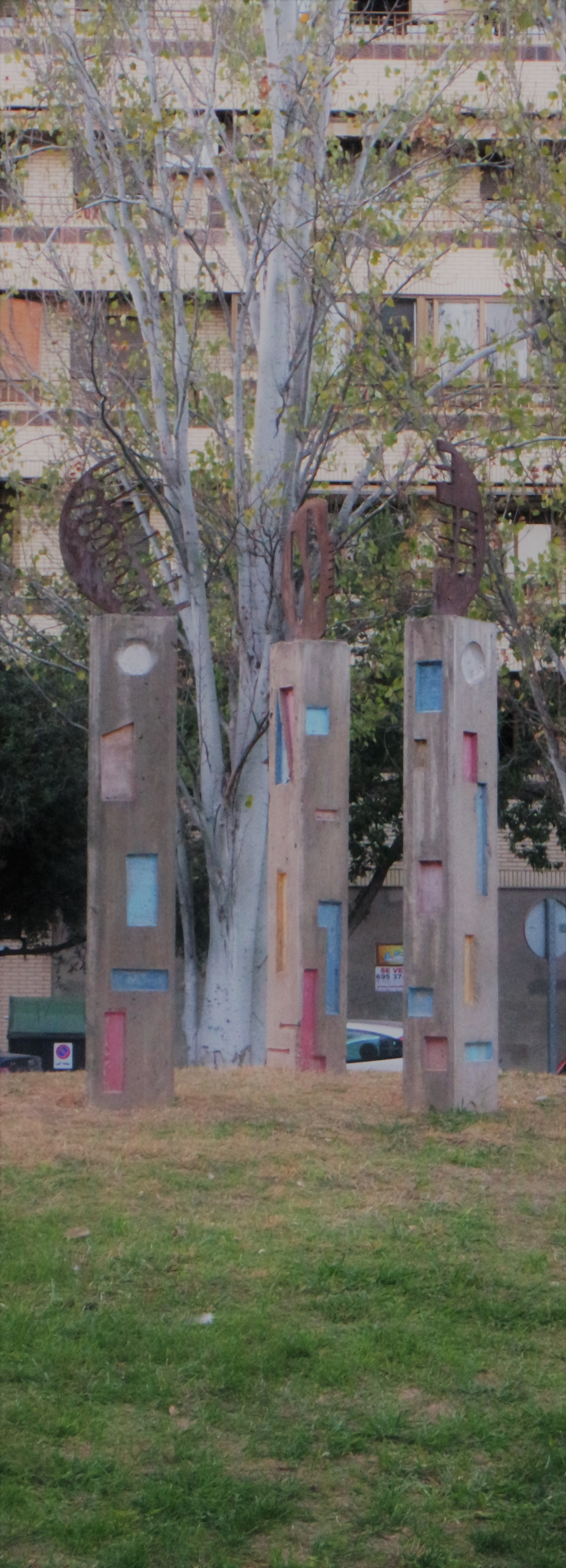
Near of the stars

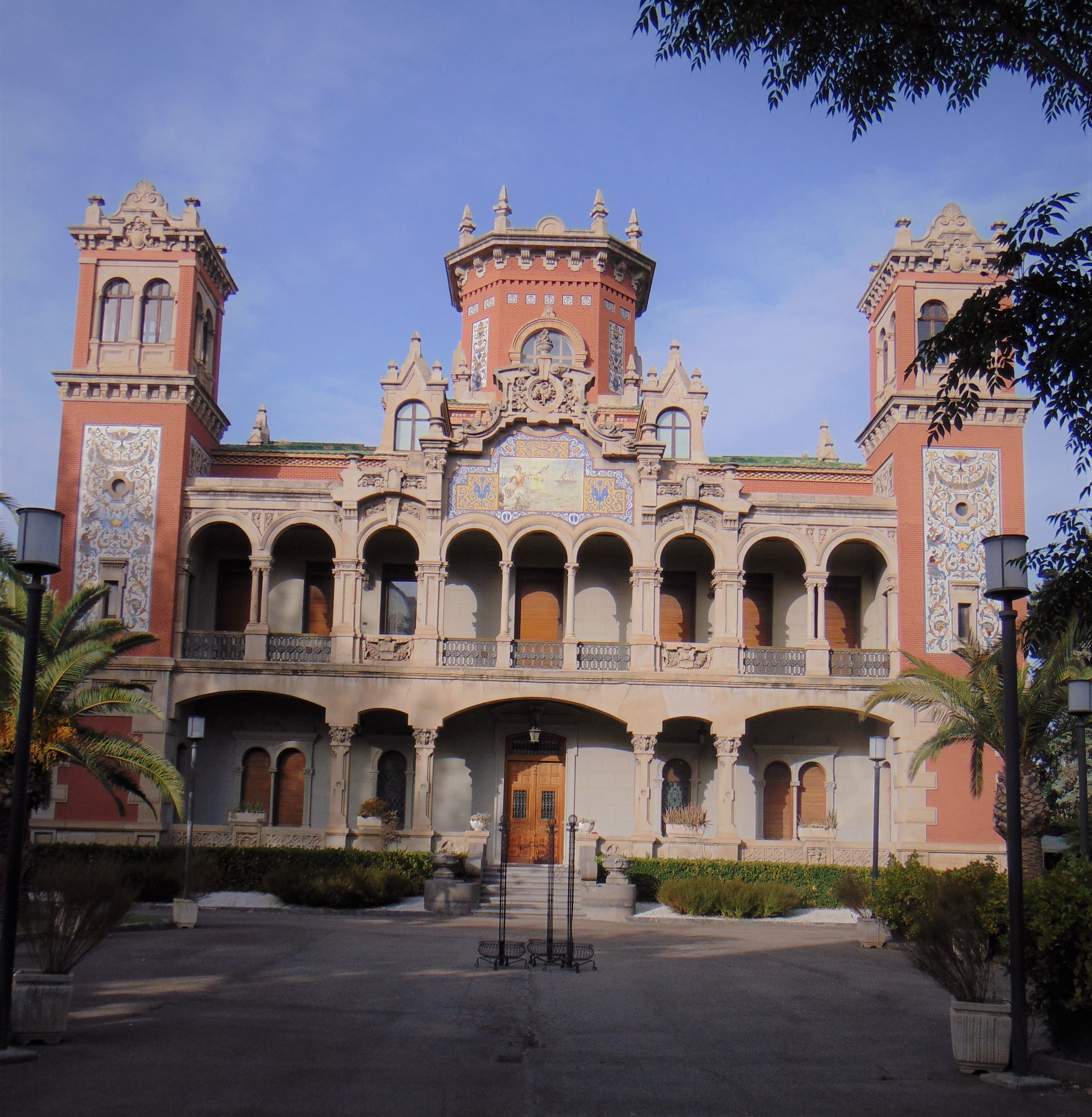
Larrinaga Palace

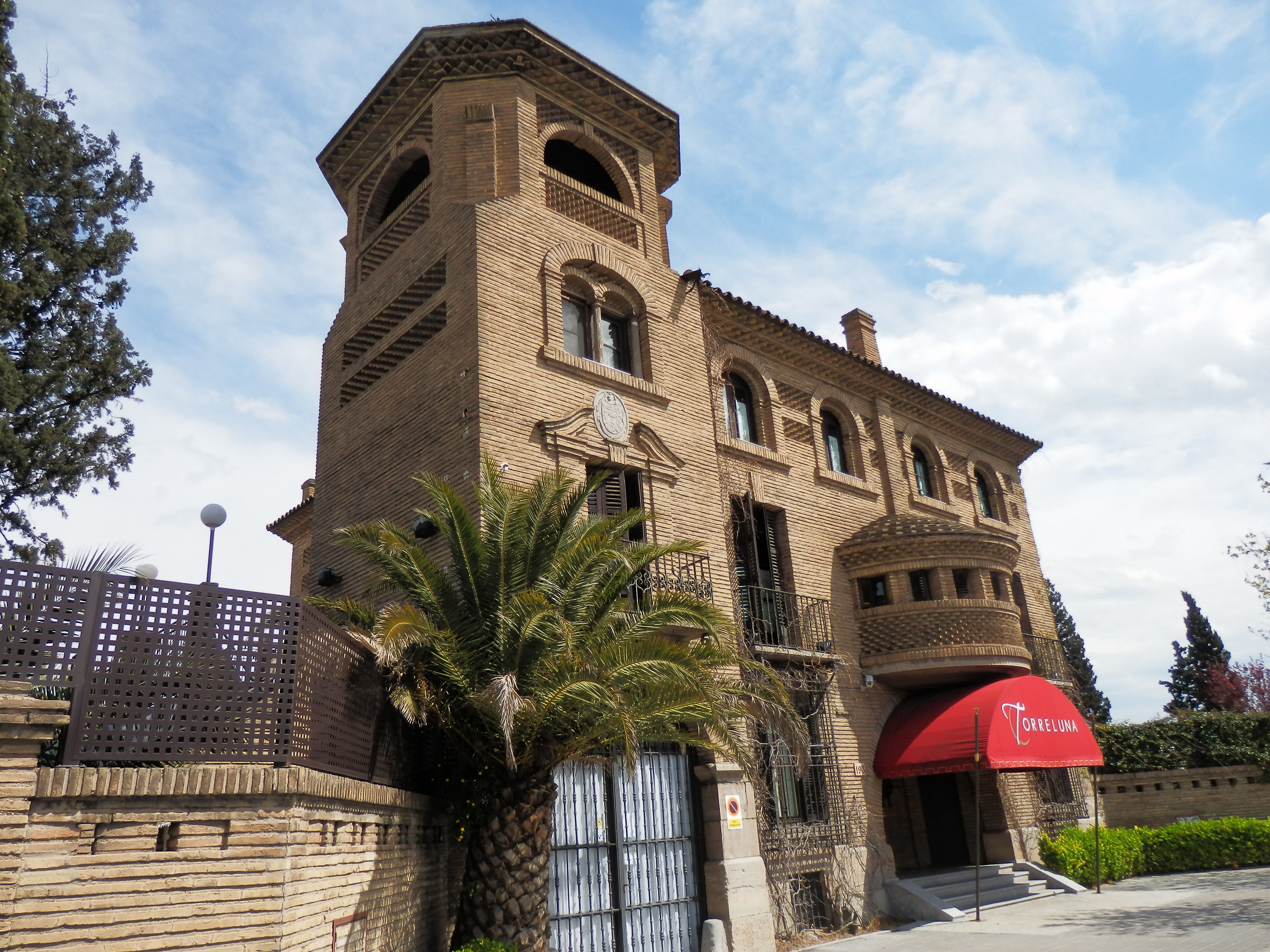
Torre Luna Estate

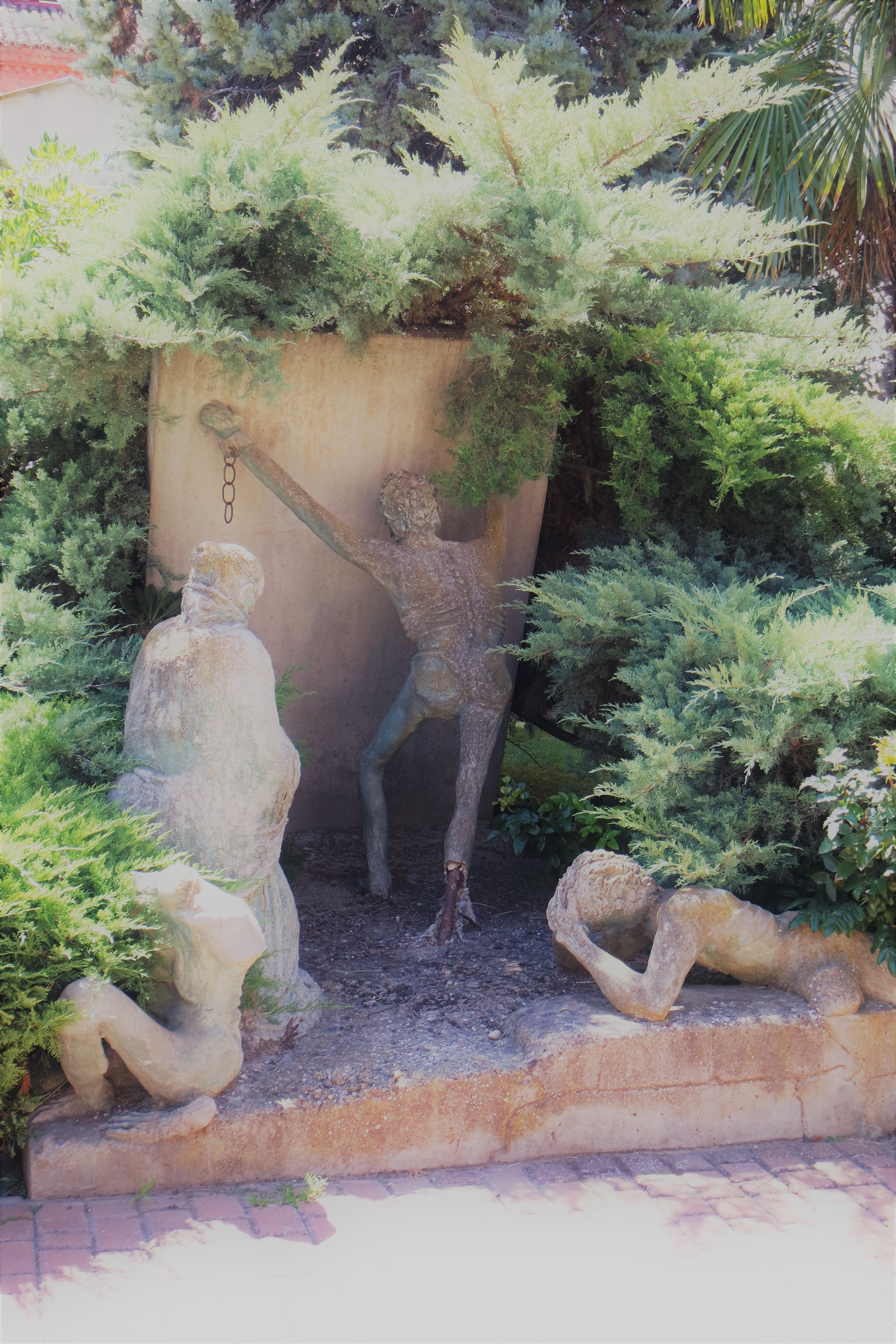
And they're not leaving yet!

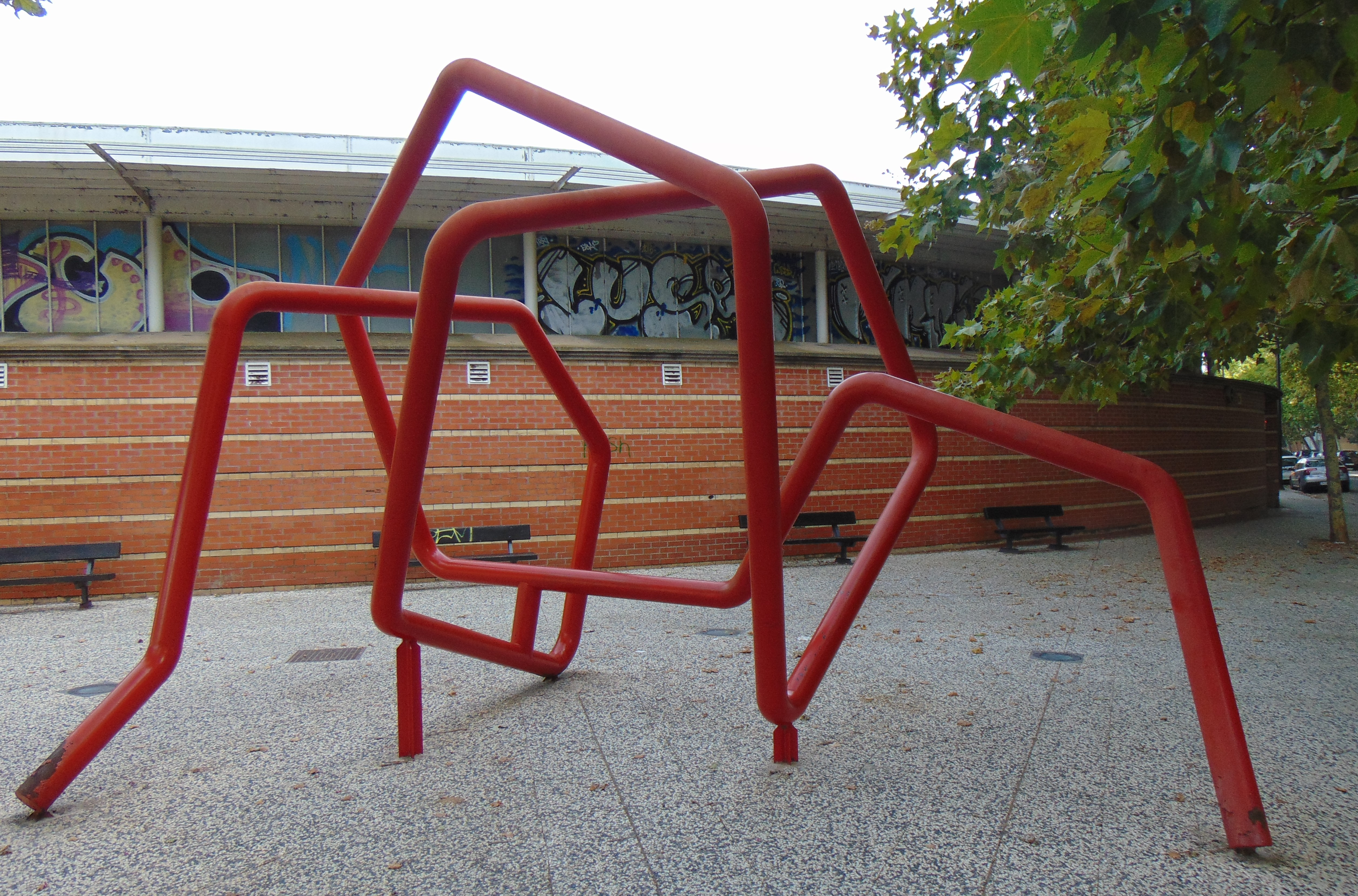
Cassiopeia

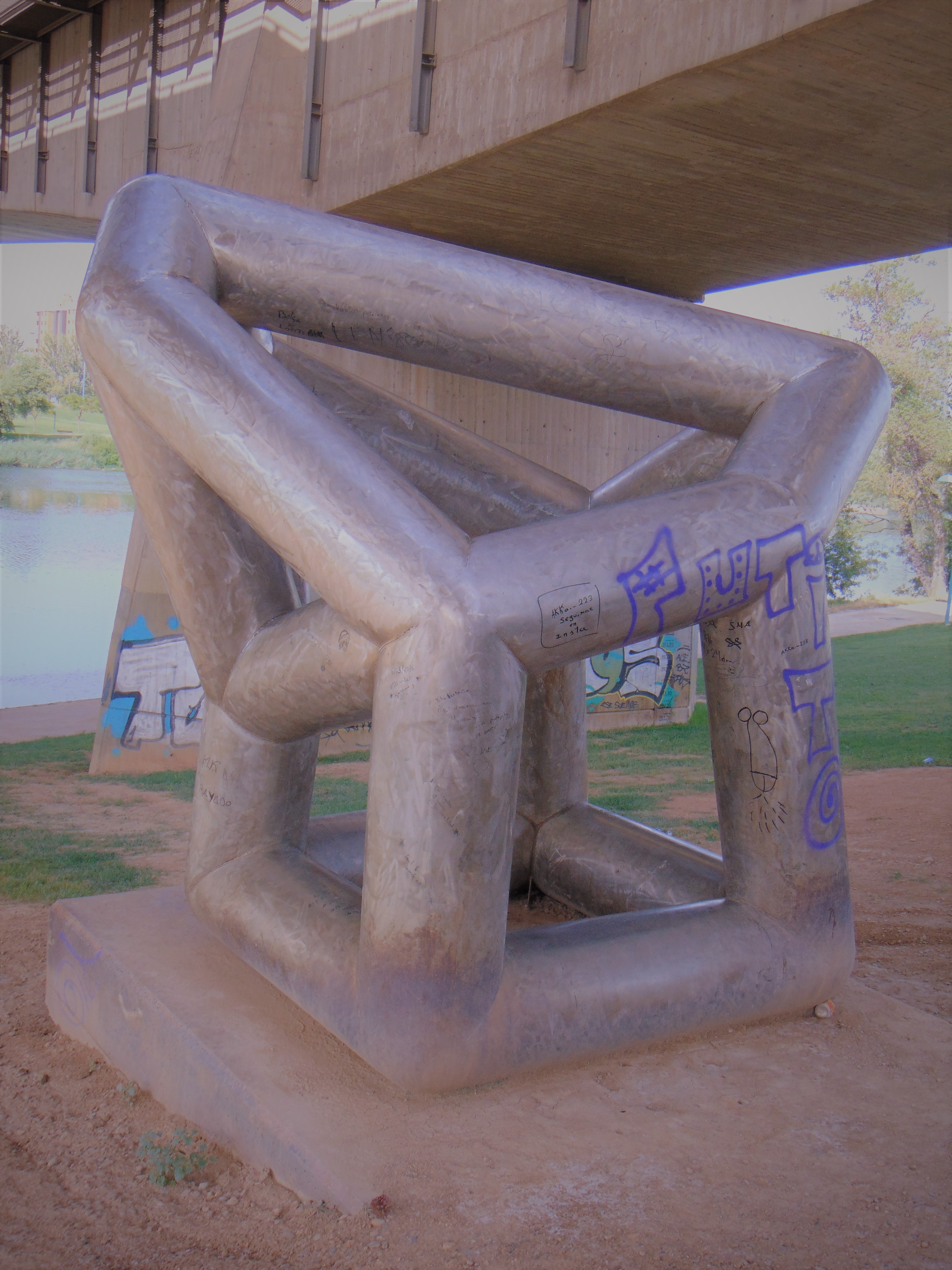
Water under the Bridge (vandalized)

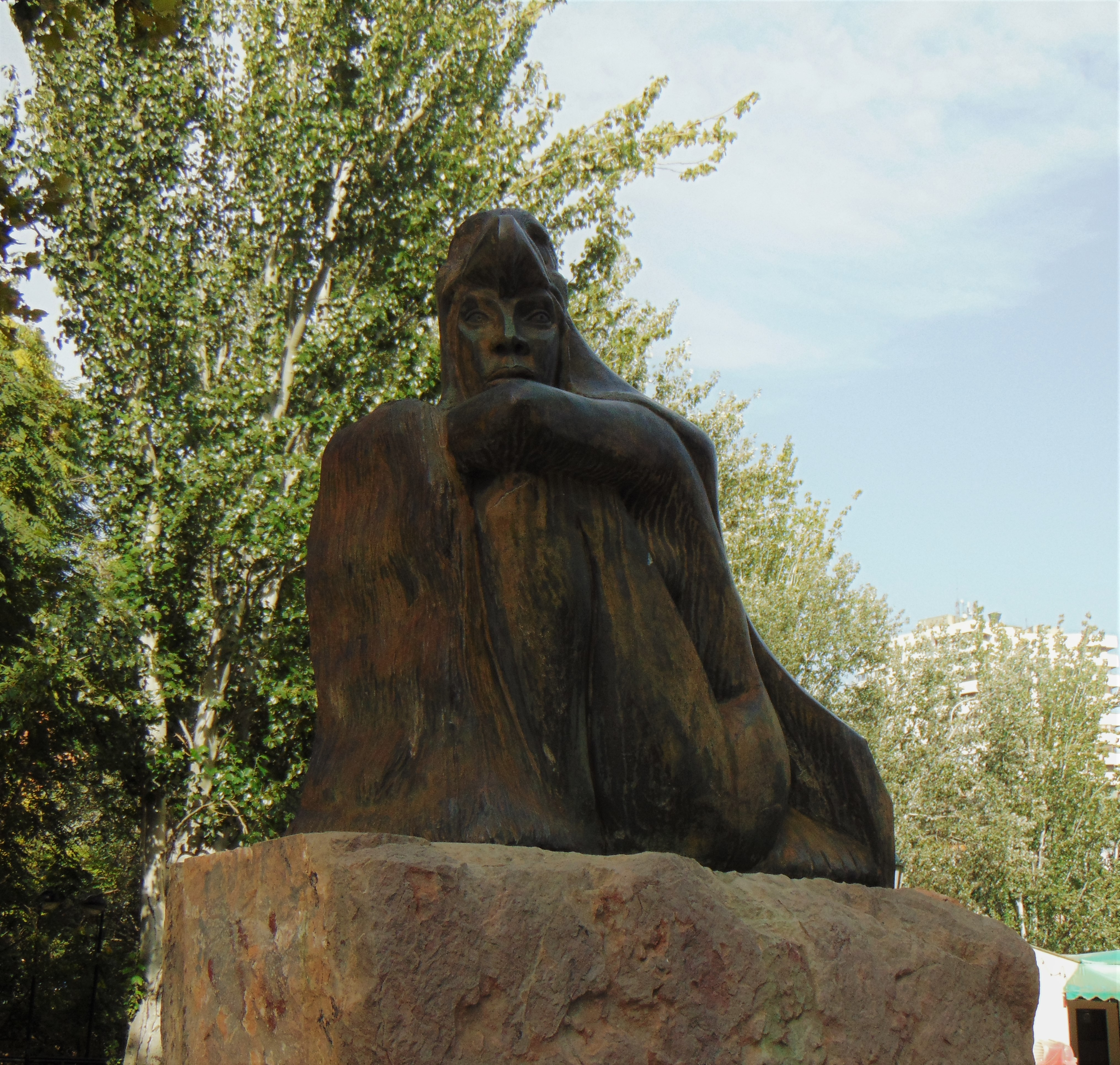
Eagle Woman

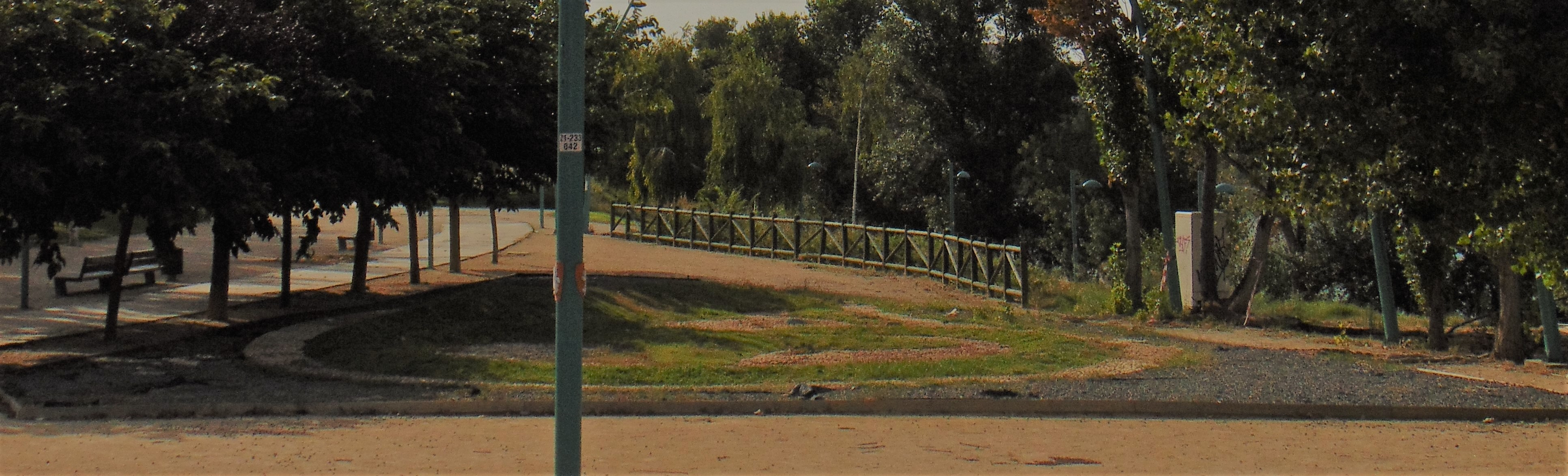
Talking ear by Eva Lootz

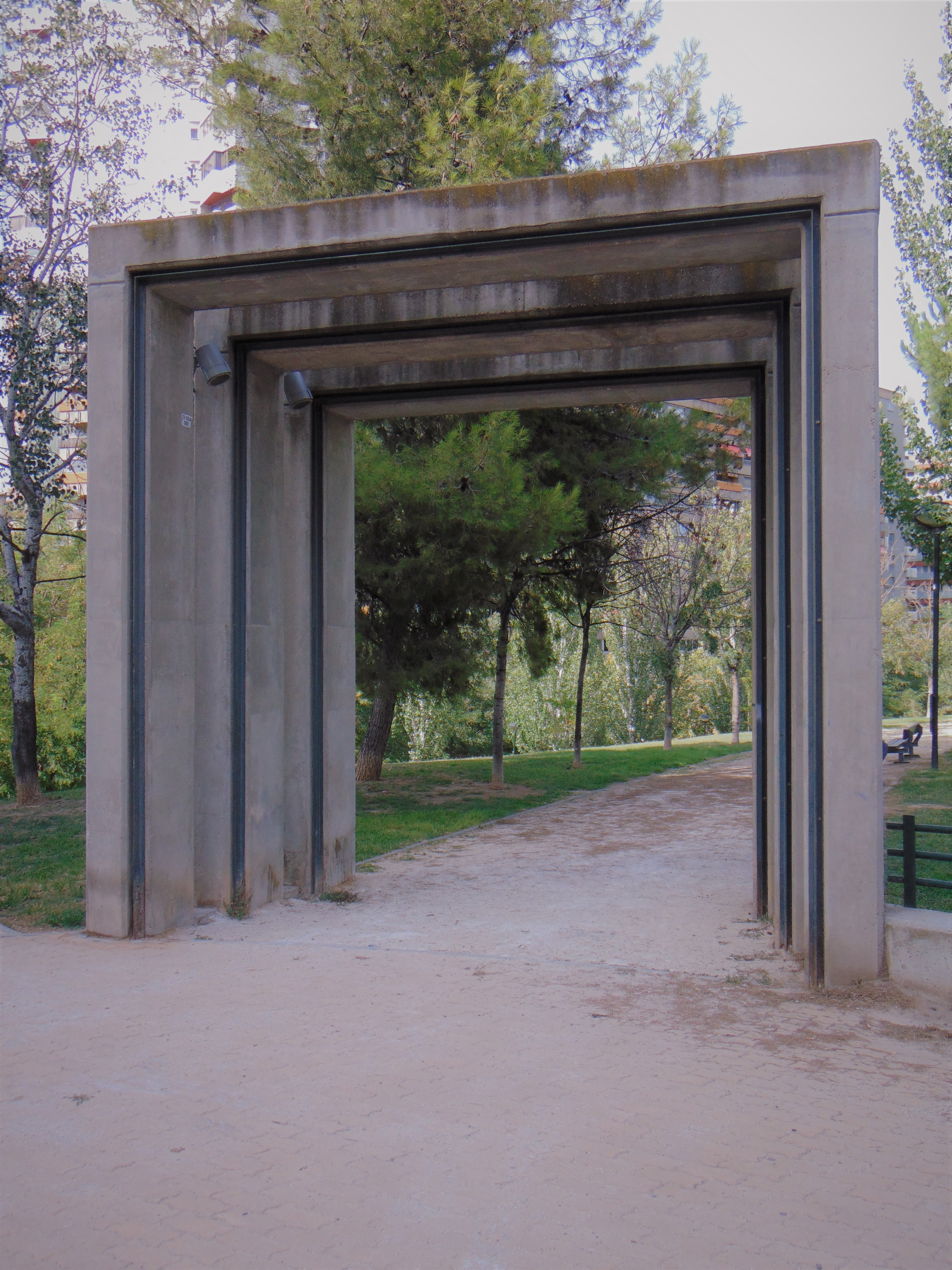

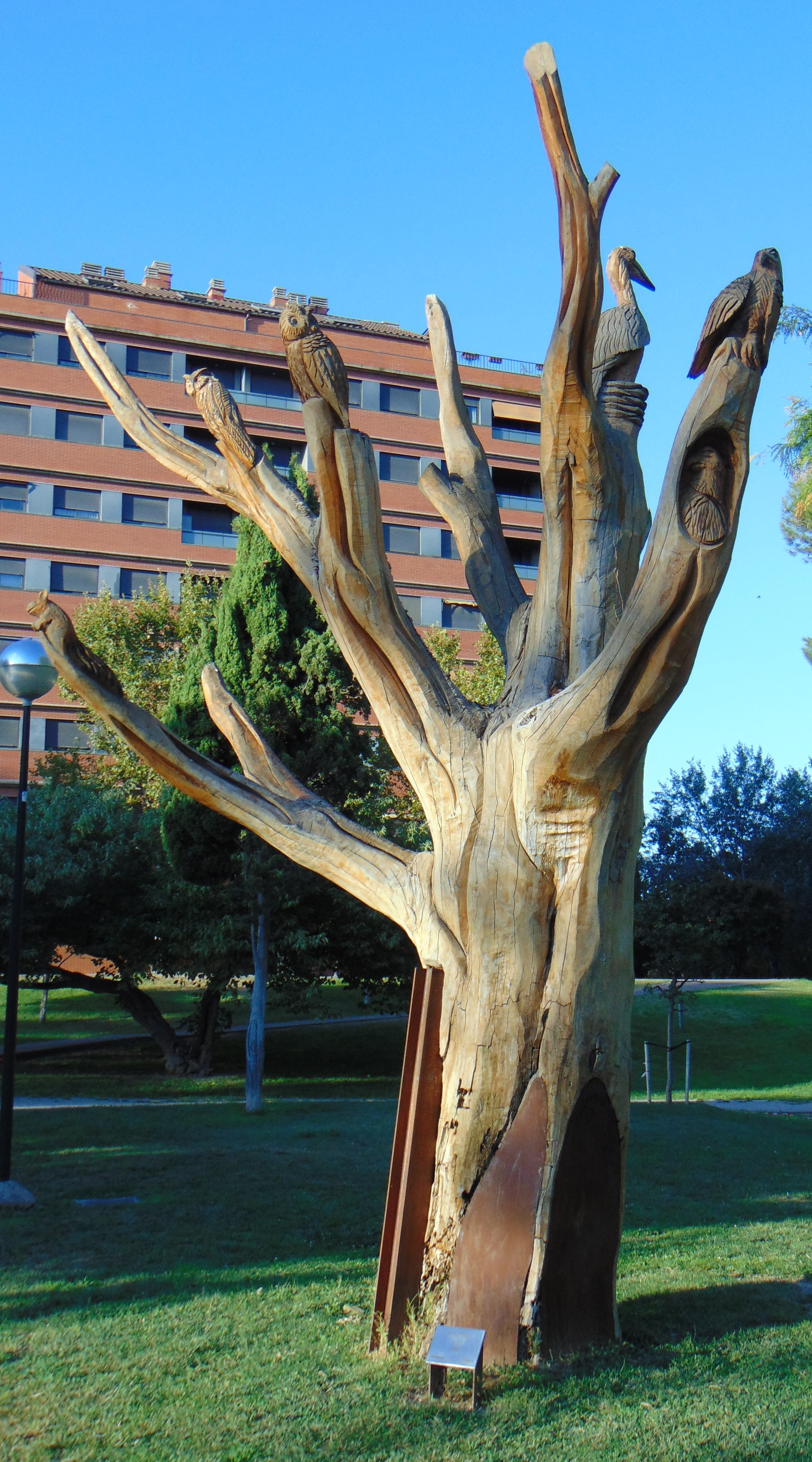
Homage to Biodiversity

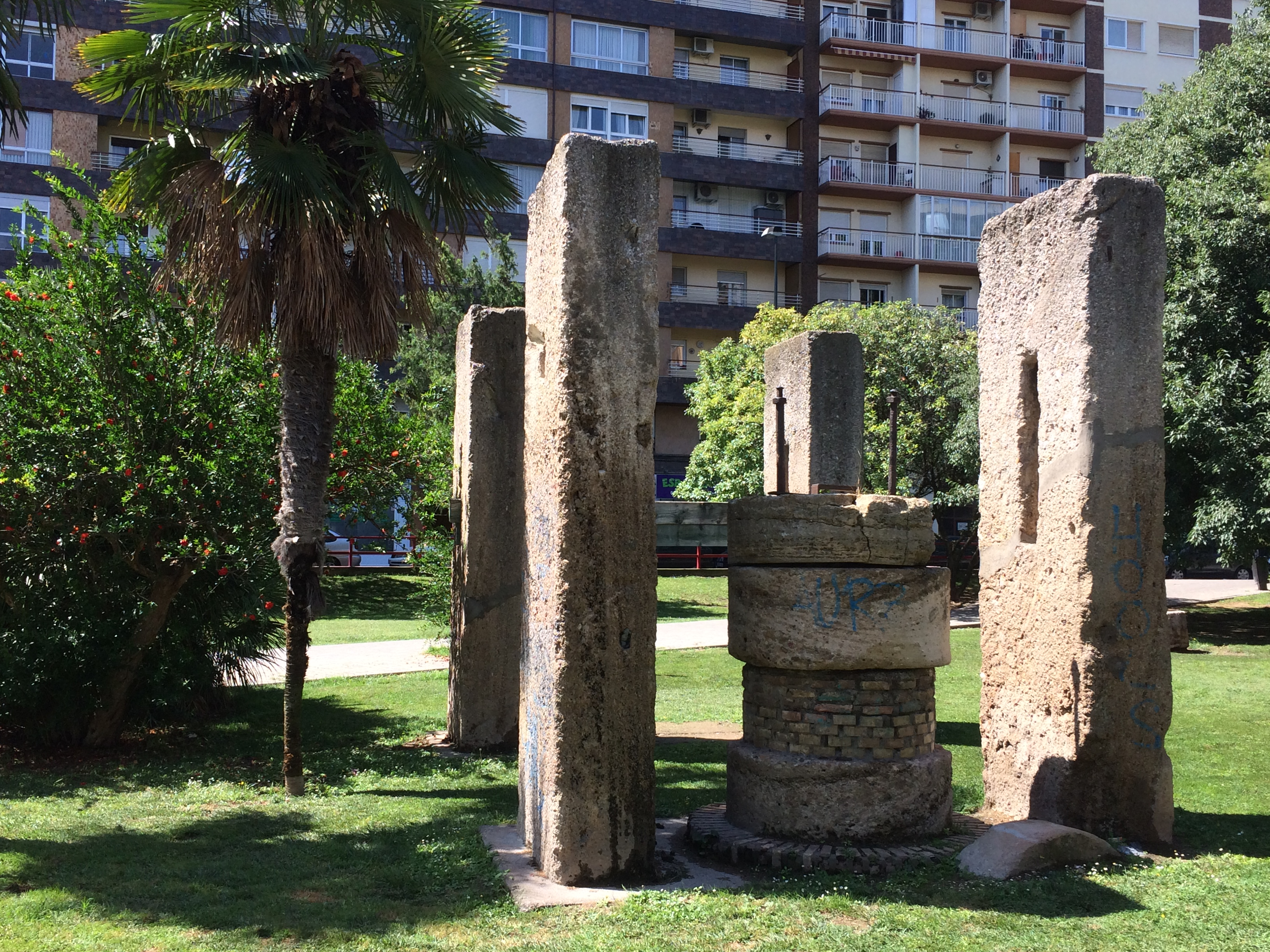
Old mill in the park Bruil

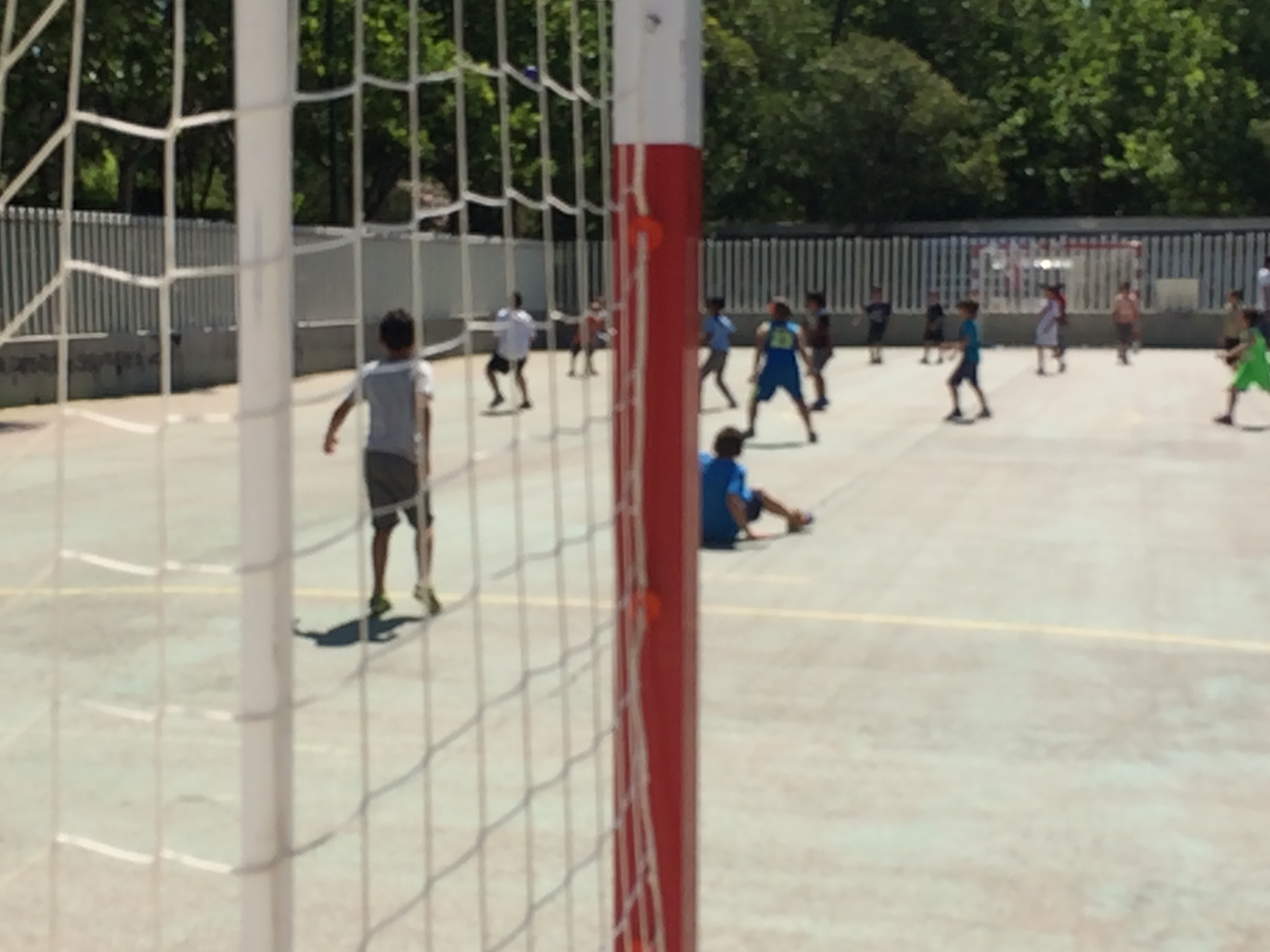
Soccer field in Bruil Park

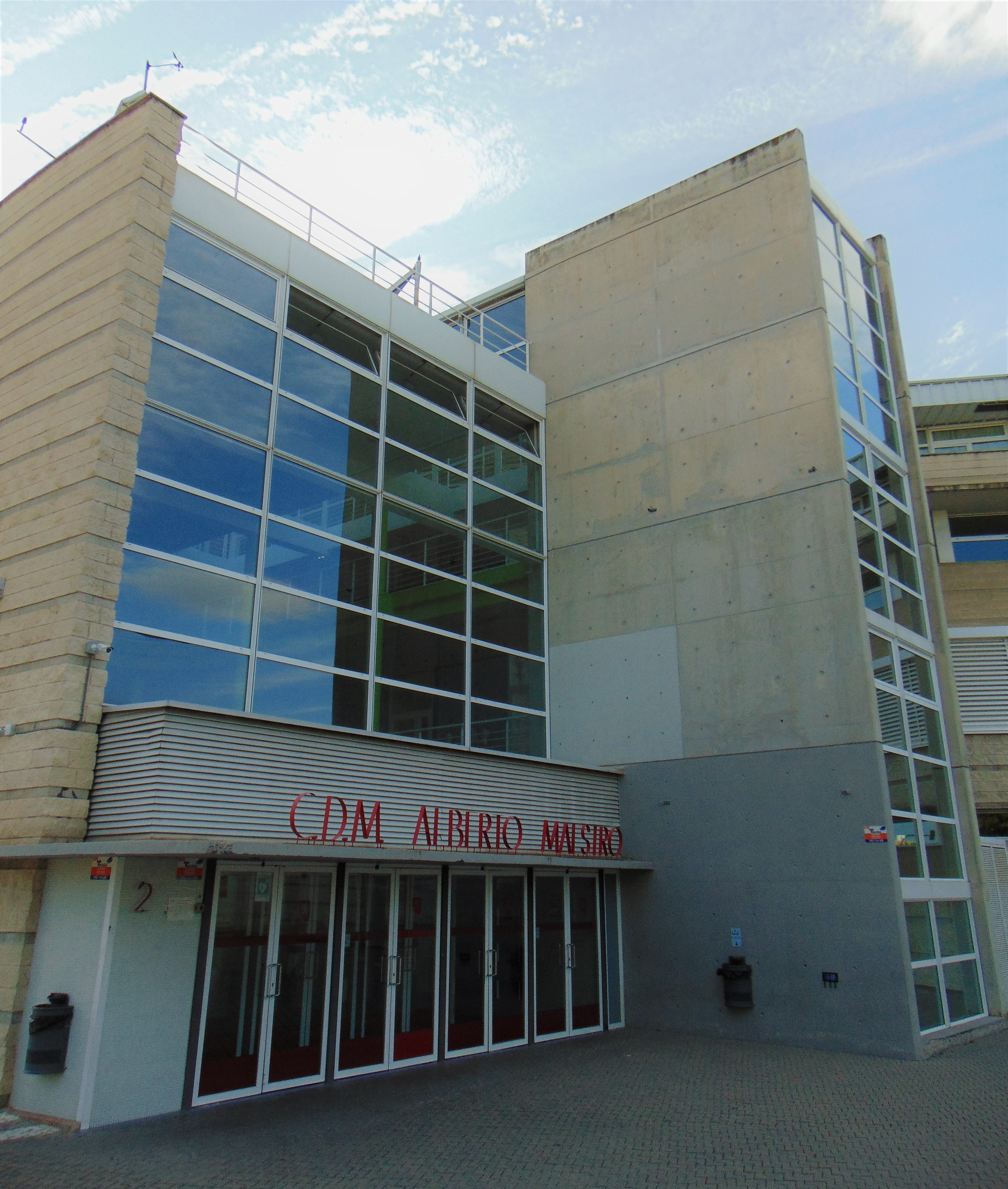
CDM Alberto Maestro

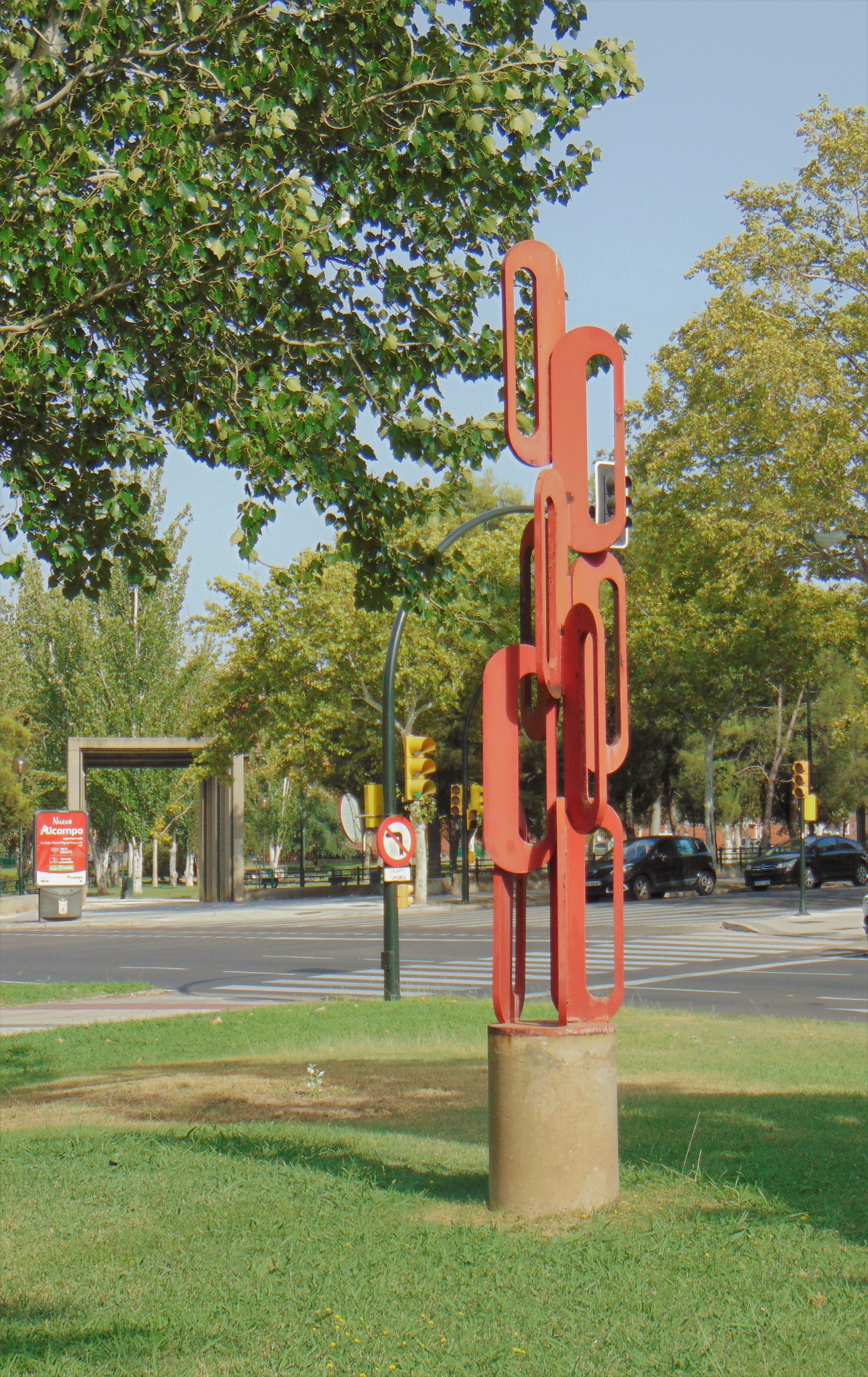

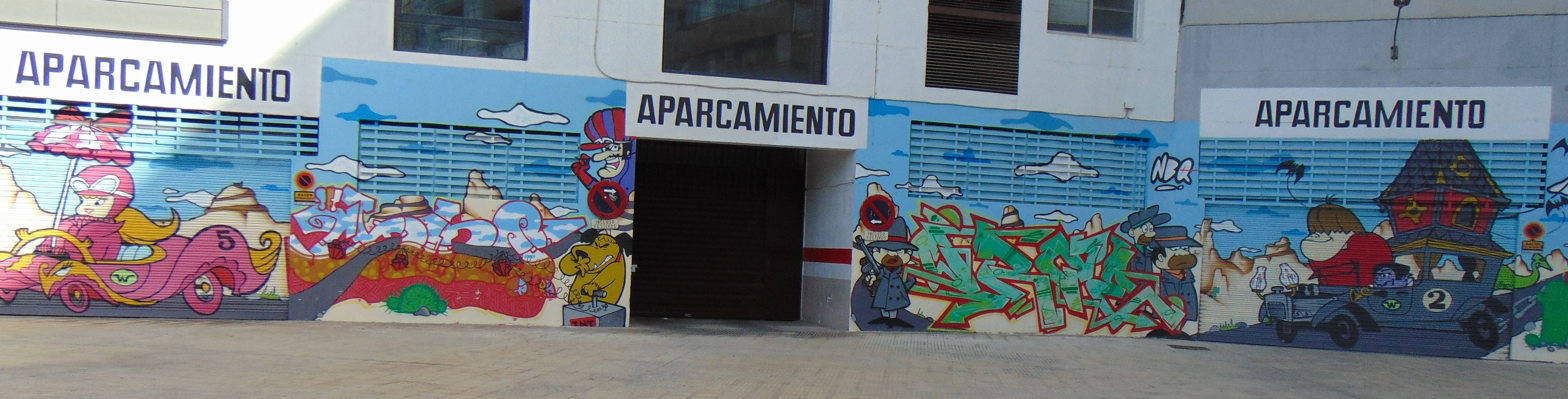

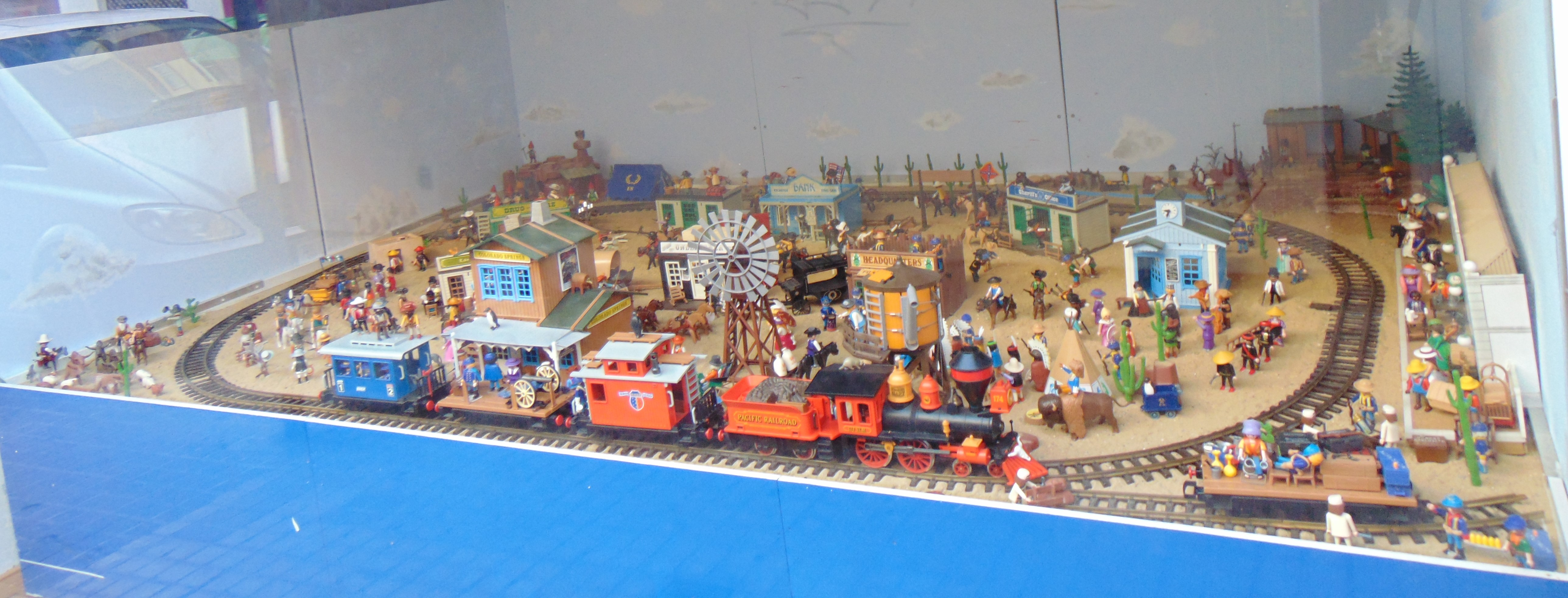

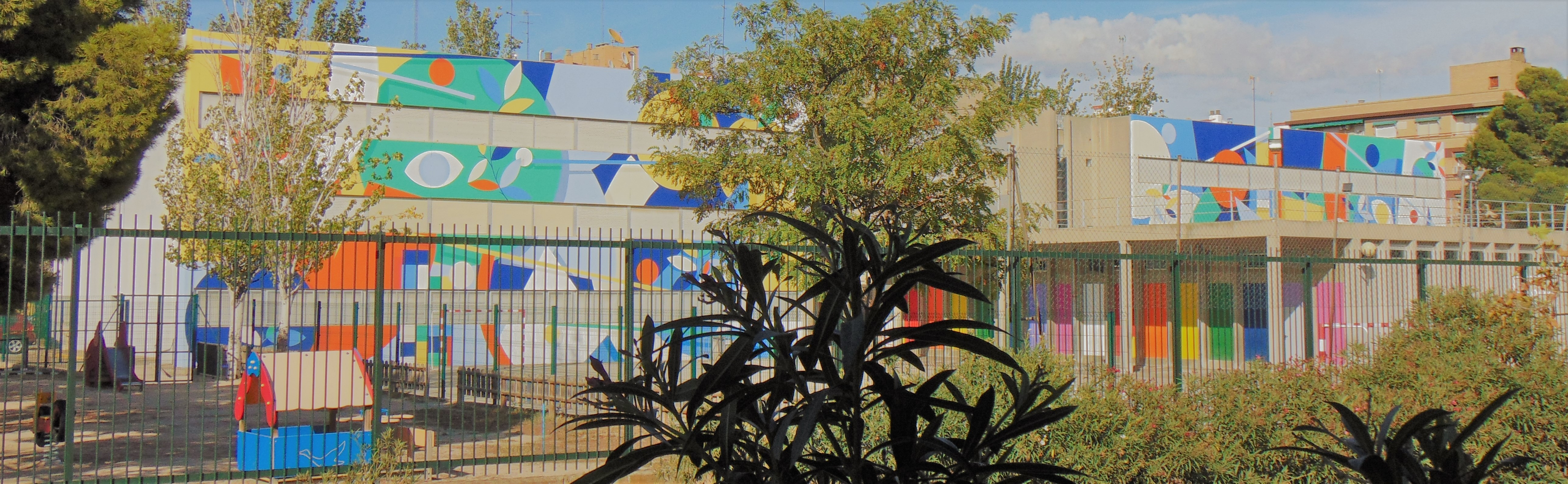
CEIP Torre Ramona

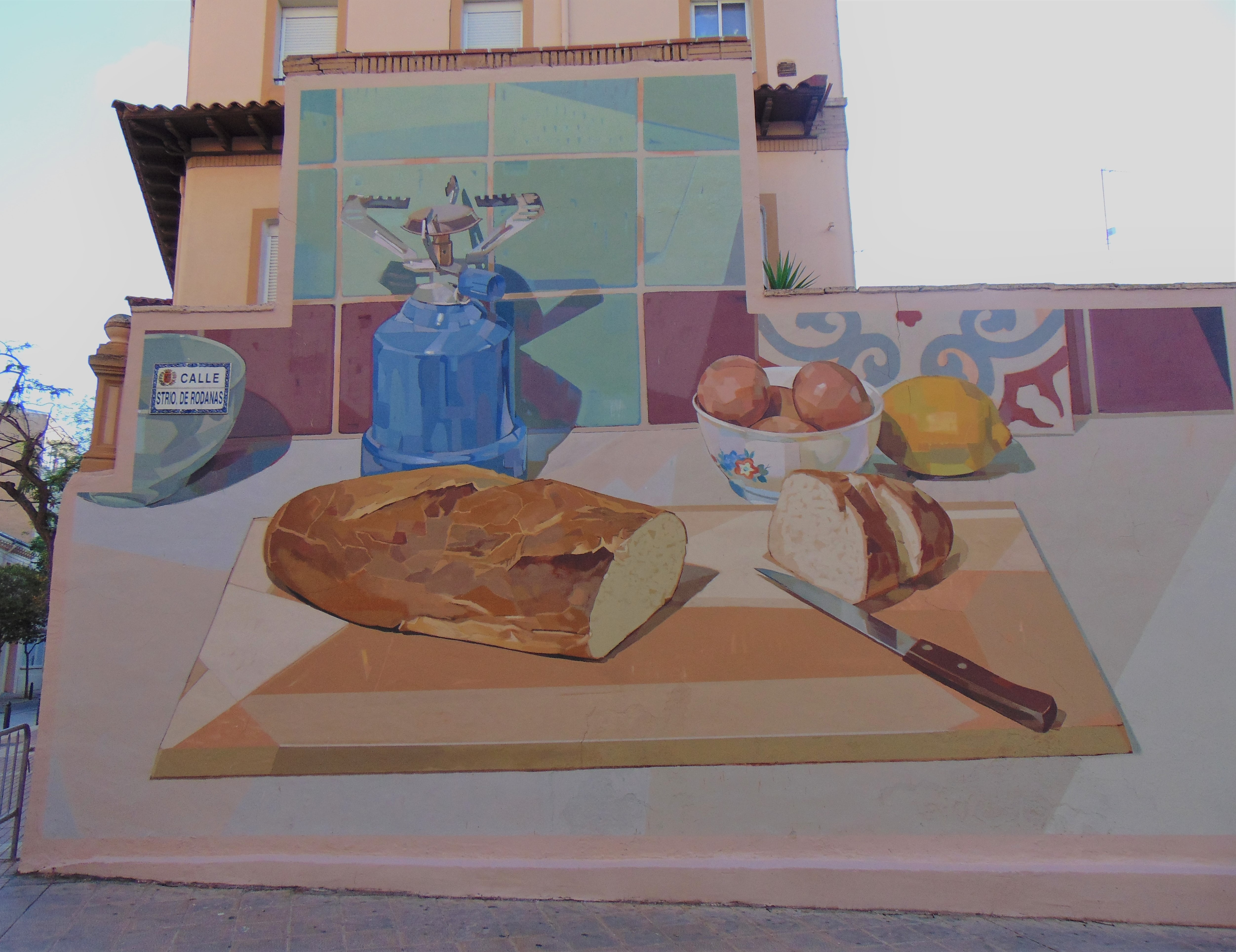
Mural by Dimitris Taxis (Festival Asalto 2019)

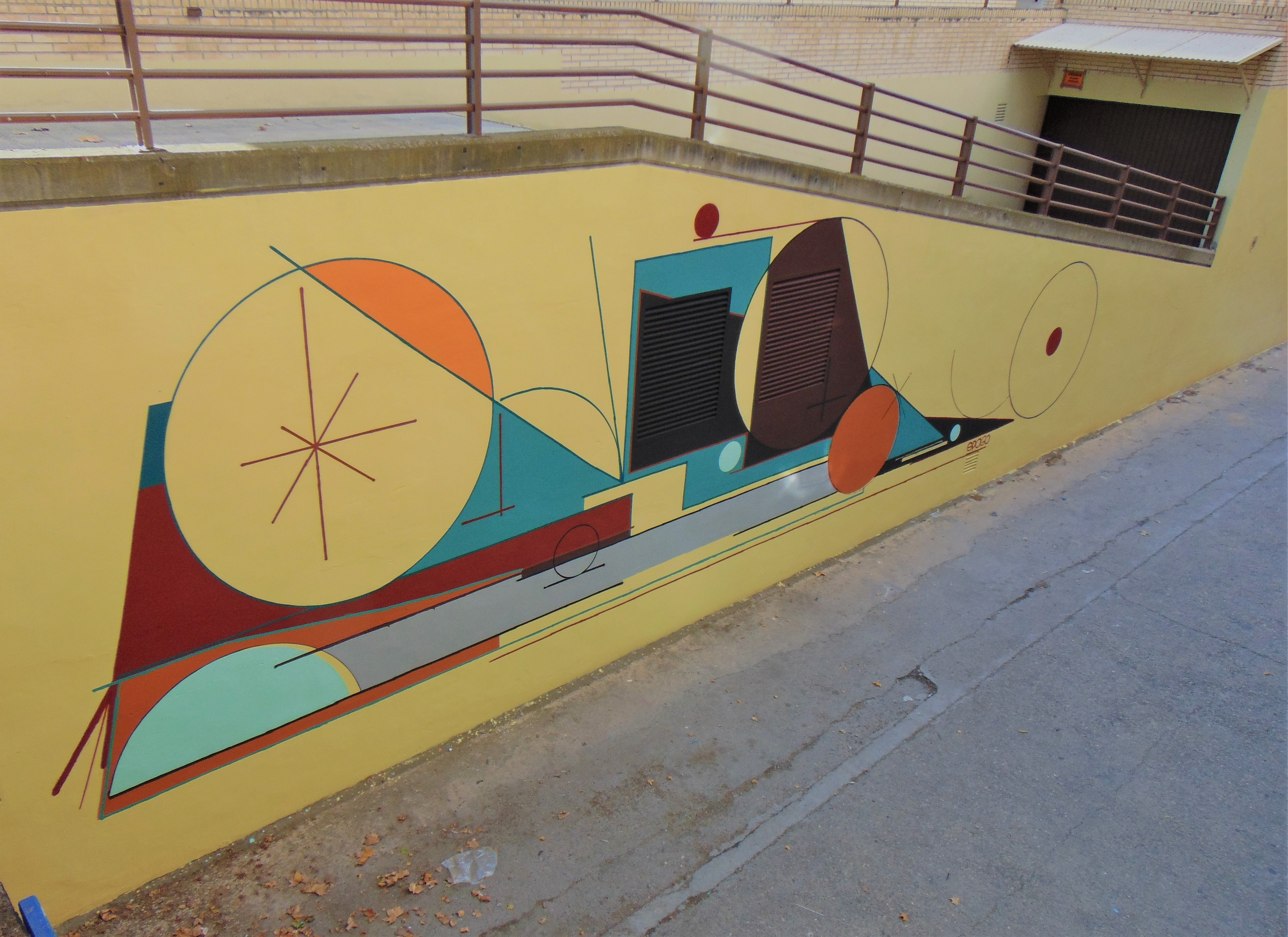
Artwork by Spogo (Festival Asalto 2019)

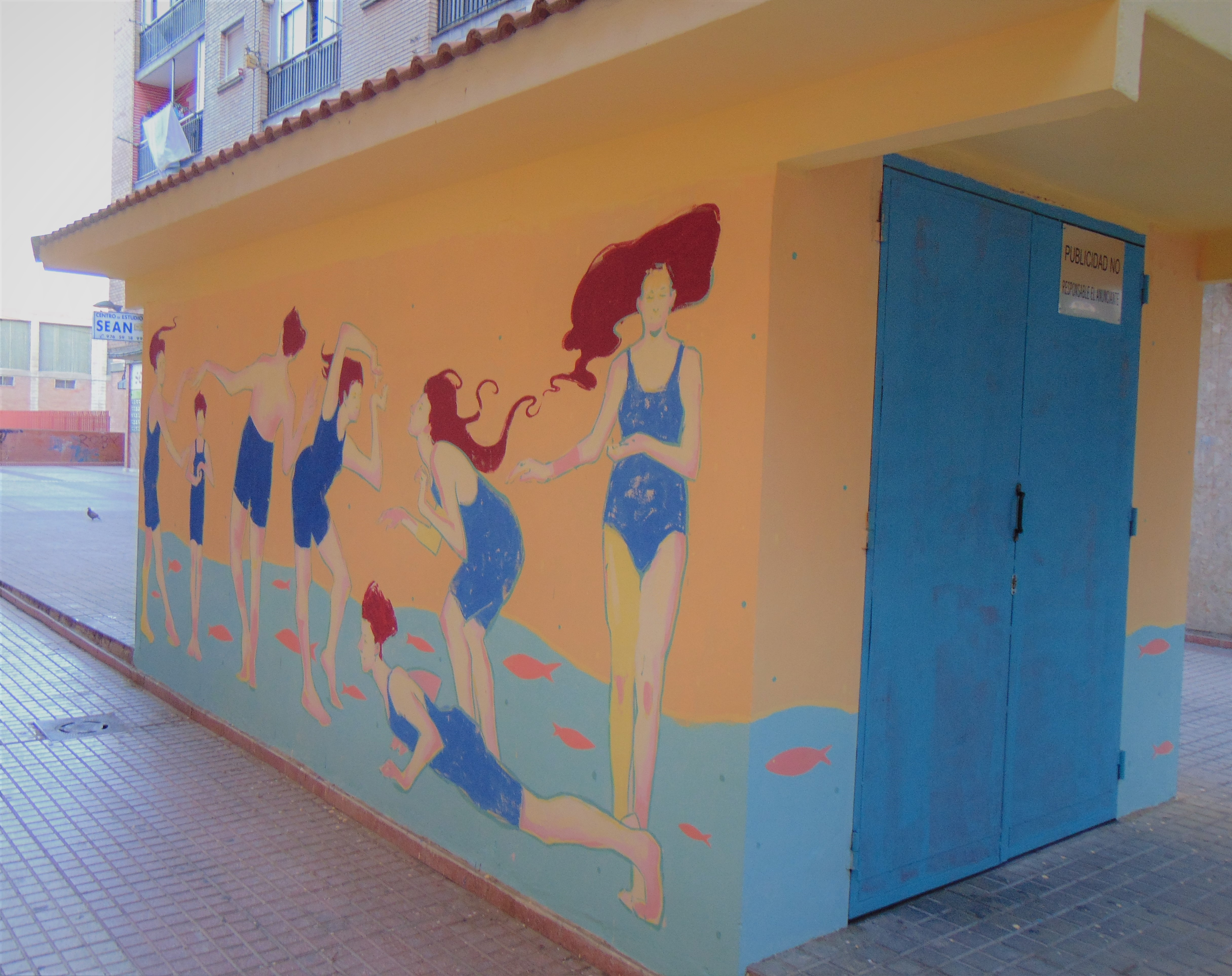
Artwork by Isabel Garmon (Festival Asalto 2019)

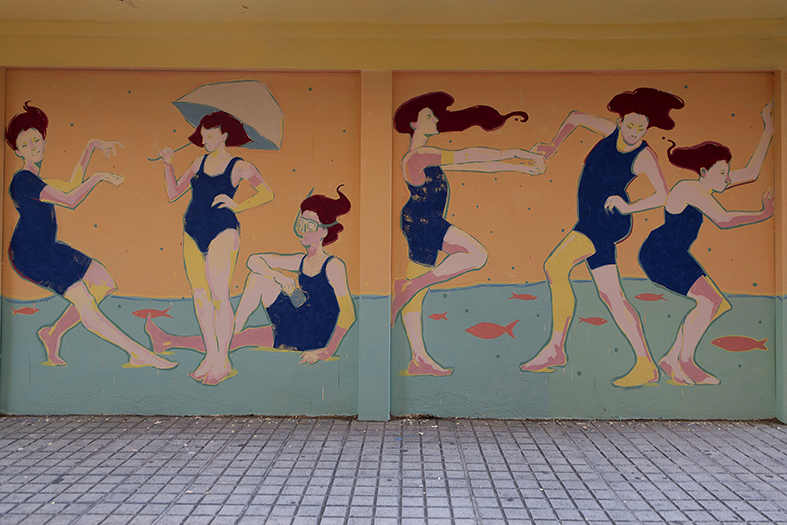
Artwork by Isabel Garmon (Festival Asalto 2019)

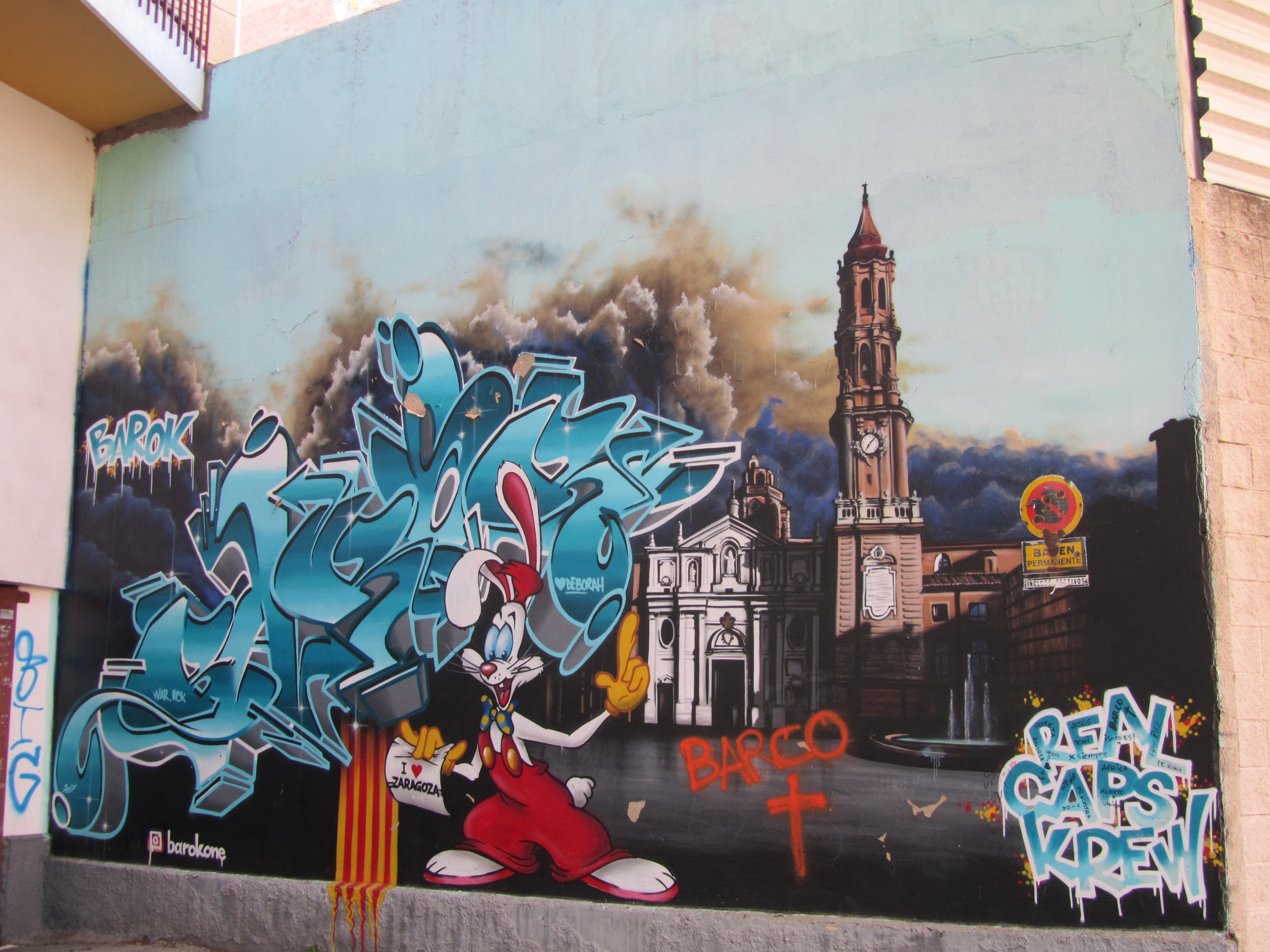
Mural by barokone

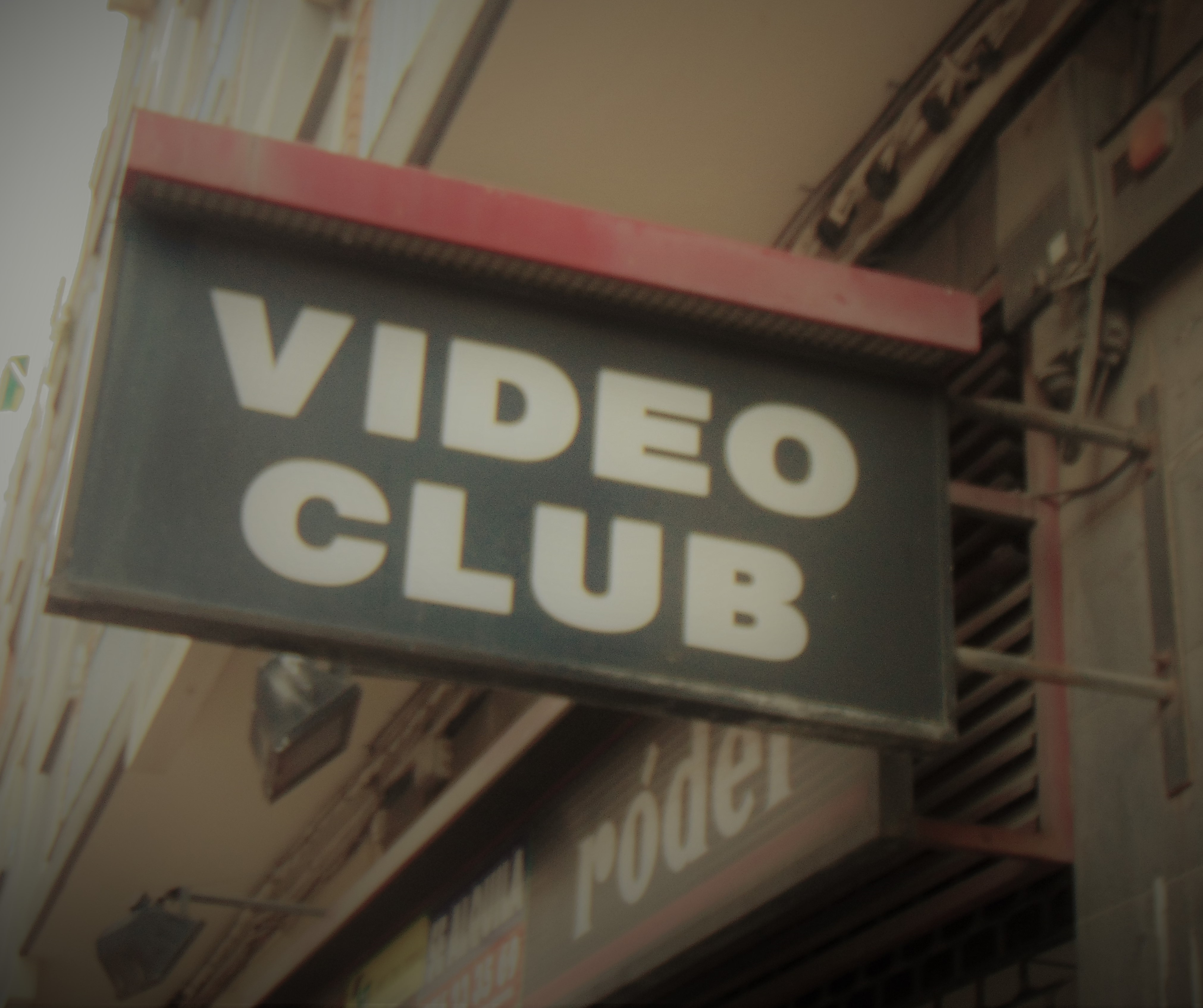
The passage of time...
