= San Pedro Alcántara =

Town in Marbella, Andalucía, Spain

Coordinates: 36°29′10″N 4°59′25″W

San Pedro Alcántara (St. Peter of Alcántara) (pop: approx 35,500) is a town in the municipality of Marbella, in Andalucía, Spain. It is a tourist destination of the Costa del Sol.

== Geography ==
It is situated in the fertile plain of the same name, Vega de San Pedro Alcántara, a broad stretch of coastal lowland surrounded in a semicircle by rugged hills. On the East the Sierra Blanca of Marbella, dominated by its highest peak Pico del Astonar (1.270 m.) better known locally as "La Concha" (The Shell) because of its resemblance to a fluted sea shell when viewed from the west. To the North, there is the Sierra del Real or El Real del Duque, the Sierra de las Nieves and those of Tolox, on the West of the town the Monte Mayor and, finally, closing the mountain line the Sierra Bermeja.

== Etymology ==
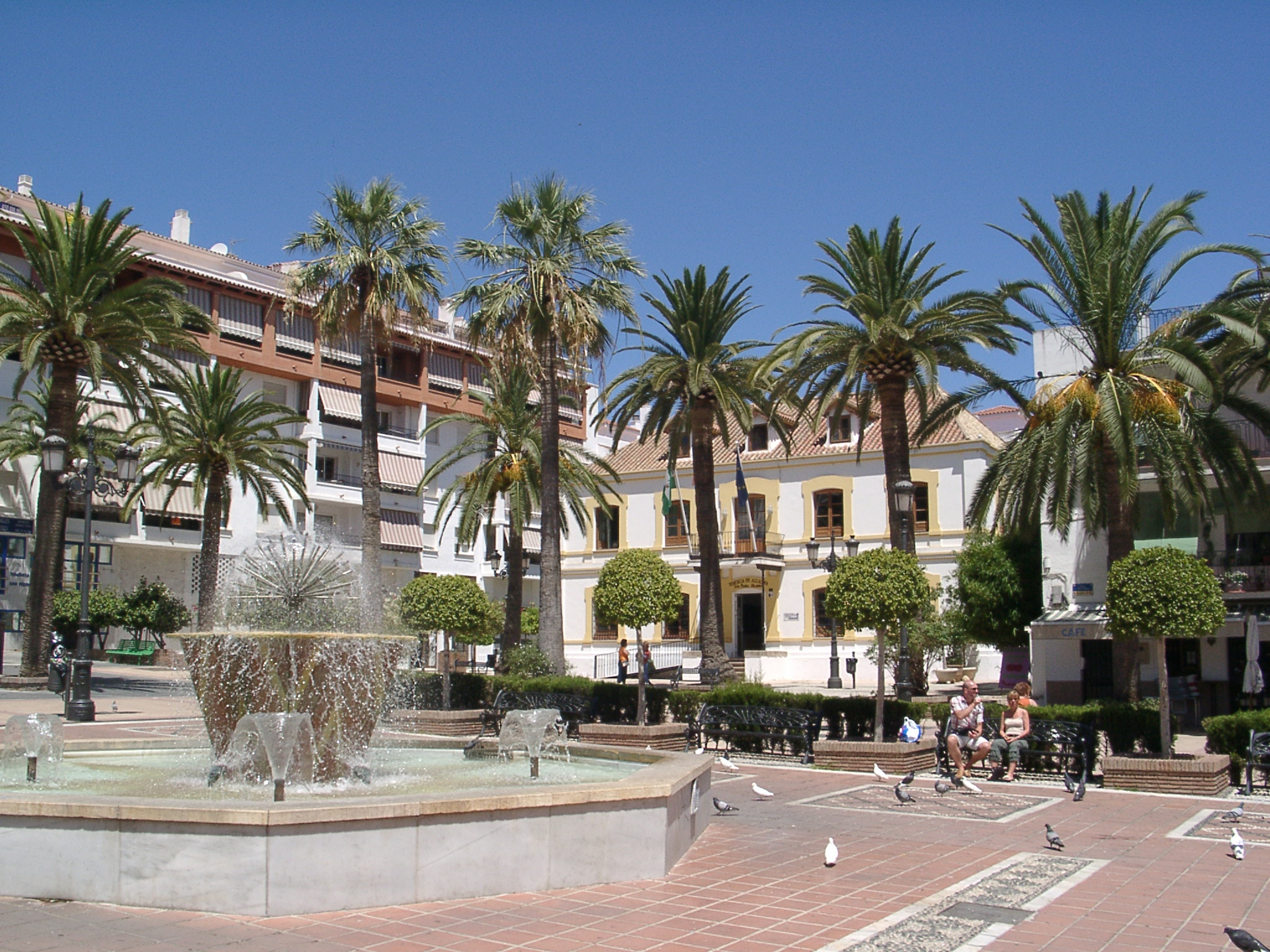
St. Peter of Alcántara

Named by the marquis of the Duero in 1860 after the franciscan friar Peter of Alcántara.

== History ==
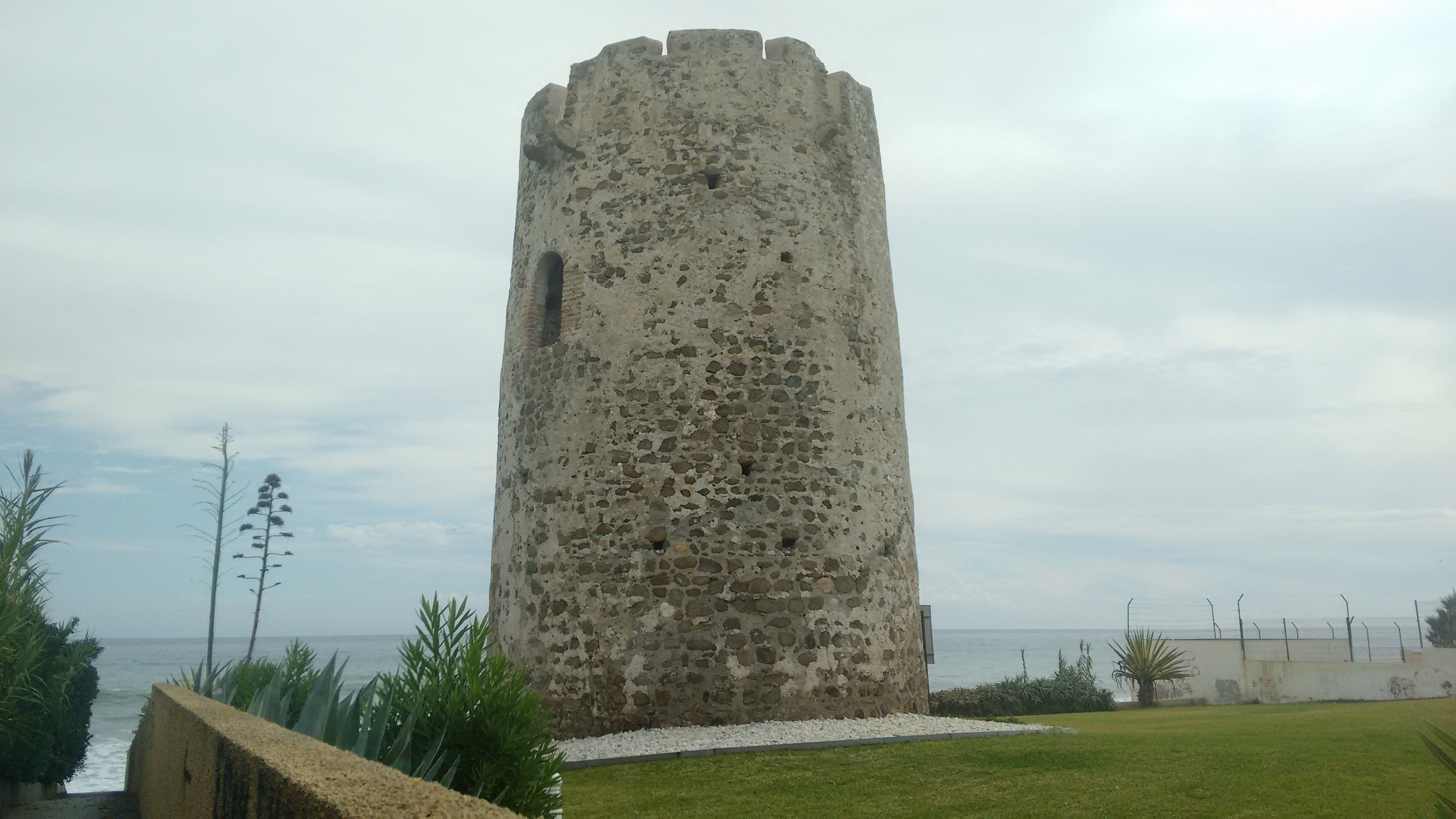
16th century Las Bovedas watchtower

During the Roman Empire times, the settlers in this Hispania Baetica area were referred to the Roman mansio of Cilniana. The remains of the 2nd century Las Bóvedas thermae are found on the coastline. The early Christian Vega del Mar basílica dates from the 4th century.

16th century drawings by Anton van den Wyngaerde commissioned by Filip II show the thermae, next to which the Las Bovedas watchtower was built. This was part of the extensive watchtower and fort system along the Spanish coast which was used to defend the population from the barbary pirates. The threat of pirate raids explain why the villages grew inland (Gaucin, Ojén or Benahavis) rather than on the coast unless they had a militar garrison and a solid fortress such as Marbella, Velez Málaga or Málaga.

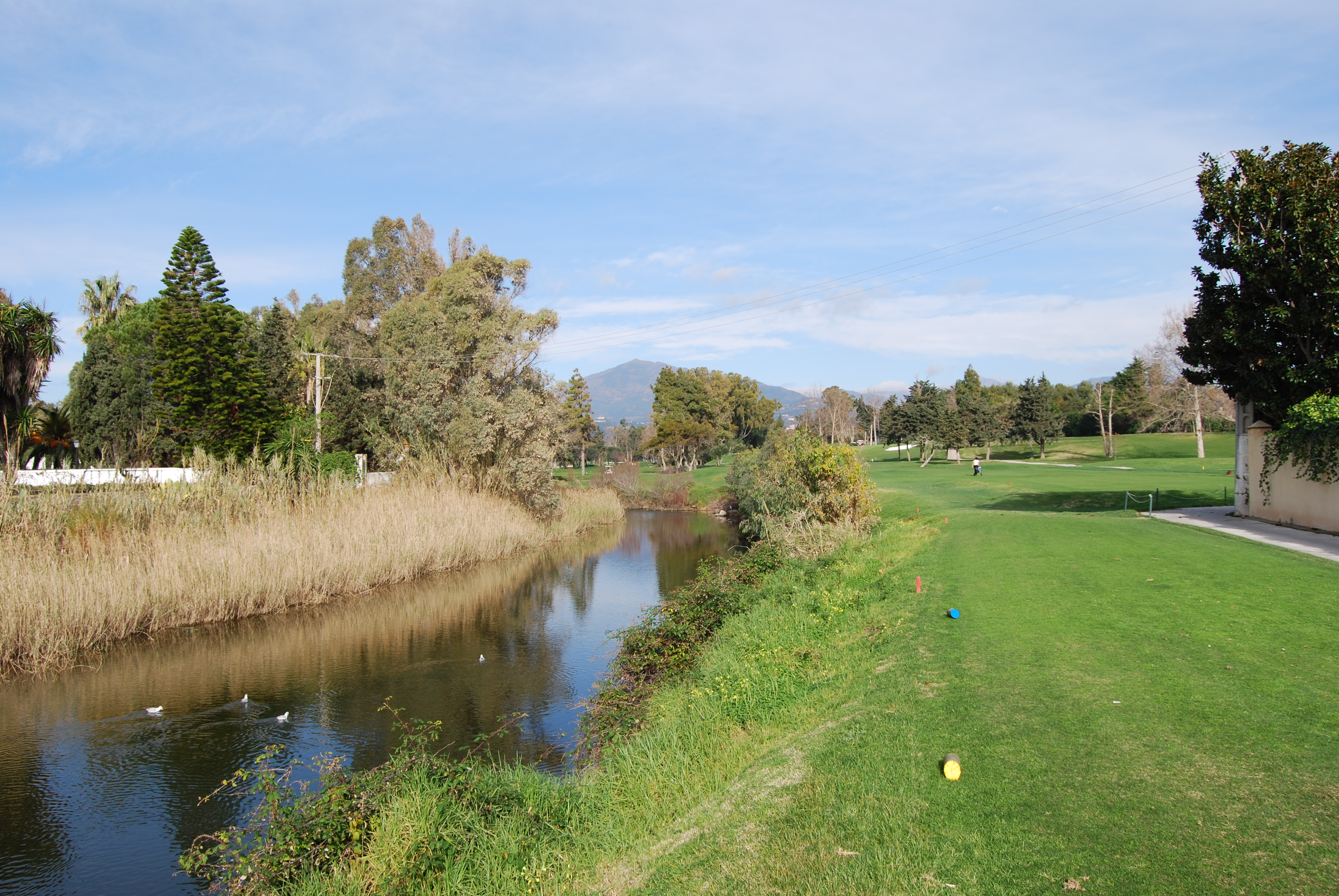
Guadalmina golf course (1959)

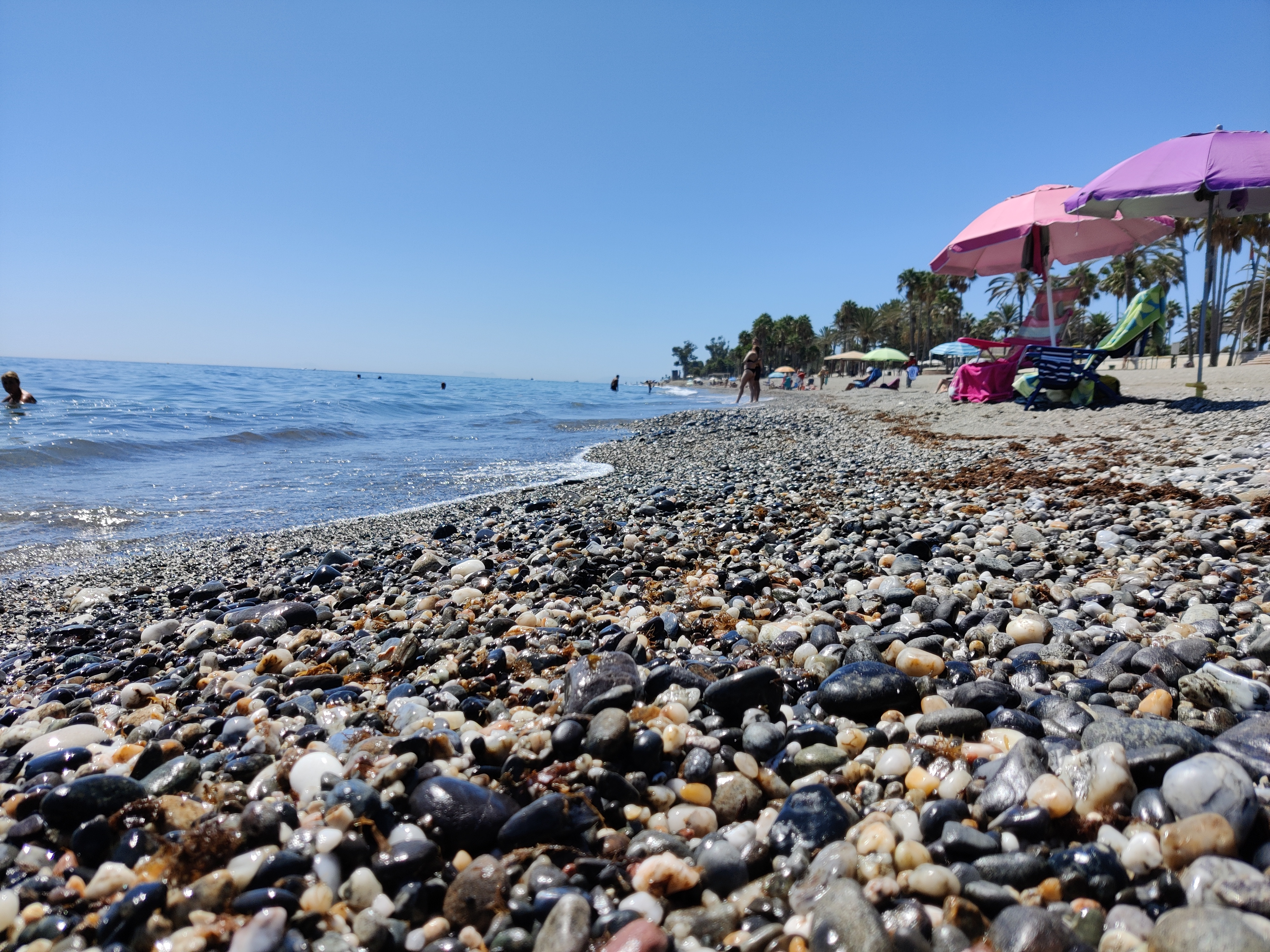
San Pedro de Alcantara beach

The current town of San Pedro de Alcántara was founded in 1860 by the charismatic 19th century politician and militar marquis of the Duero, Manuel Gutiérrez de la Concha e Irigoyen as a rural colony. It was the largest and most modern privately owned Spanish agricultural colony of its time. It spread from San Pedro de Alcantara to Cancelada (Estepona), village founded by the marquis too. The main crop was sugar cane, grown with the expertise of Cuban engineer Álvaro Reynoso, as the marqui's brother was Captain General of Cuba. It made use of new built damms, acequias, sugar cane mill (ingenio), electric power plant and other farming machinery such as imported reapers or threshing machines. It was contemporary to the Larios family sugar production in Torre del Mar and Nerja. In 1881 sugar beet was introduced. The fields requested skilled and experienced farmers, and due to the good living conditions offered to the workers, many converged to the colony from the cities of Granada, Almería, Valencia and Murcia. After the death of the marquis the colony was sold by his partners to Azucarera Española, the Spanish sugar monopolistic trust.

In 1933 Norberto Goizueta Díaz bought the Guadalmina rural cortijo. The 1950 census shows 612 inhabitants in Guadalimna, 274 in the Ingenio neighbourhood and 1.028 in San Pedro de Alcántara. The first steps of today's tourist location were taken in 1959 when the Guadalmina golf course was built, being the first golf course in Marbella, as Rio Real golf course opened in 1965. Also in 1959 the Hotel Cortijo Blanco was opened as a hotel and holiday homes for Spanish filmmakers and artists such as Mingote or Benito Perojo. During the second half of the 20th century San Pedro de Alcántara grew as a town close to the most important tourist destinations of Marbella and Puerto Banús. From 1991 to 2006 the GIL party governed Marbella, led by the charismatic Jesus Gil. During the Spanish property bubble many holiday homes, urbanizations and hotels were built around San Pedro de Alcantara. In 2006 the GIL city council was forcibly dissolved by prime minister José Luis Rodríguez Zapatero because of, amongst other cases of political, economic and urban zoning corruption, the Operation Malaya.

== Heritage and monuments ==
- Las Bóvedas thermae (2nd century)
- Vega del Mar early Christian basilica (4th century)
- Las Bóvedas watchtower (16th century)
- San Pedro de Alcantara 19th century colonial buildings: Ingenio theatre, church, villa de San Luis, Guadaiza cultural center,
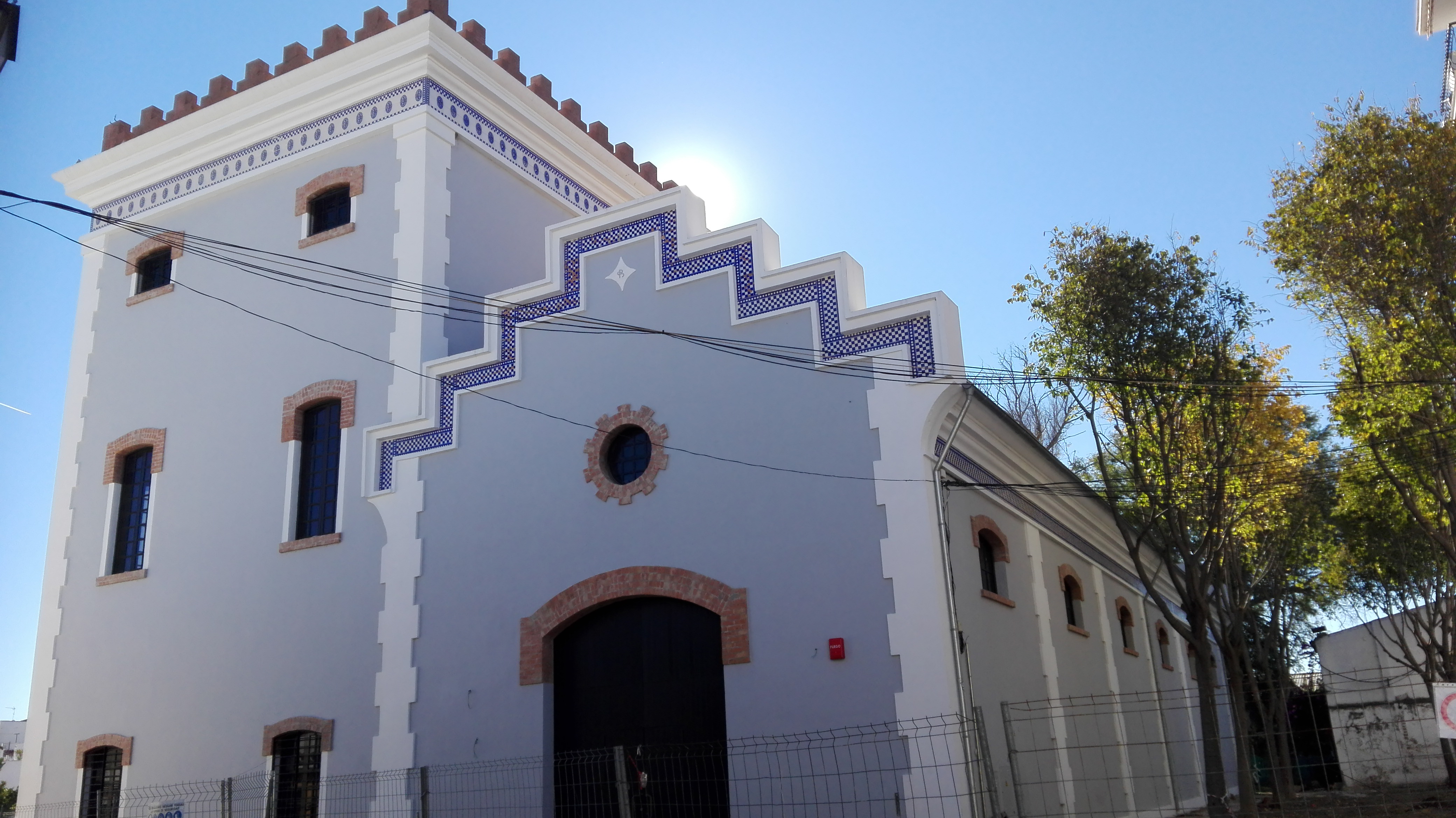
  Ingenio theatre, former distillery
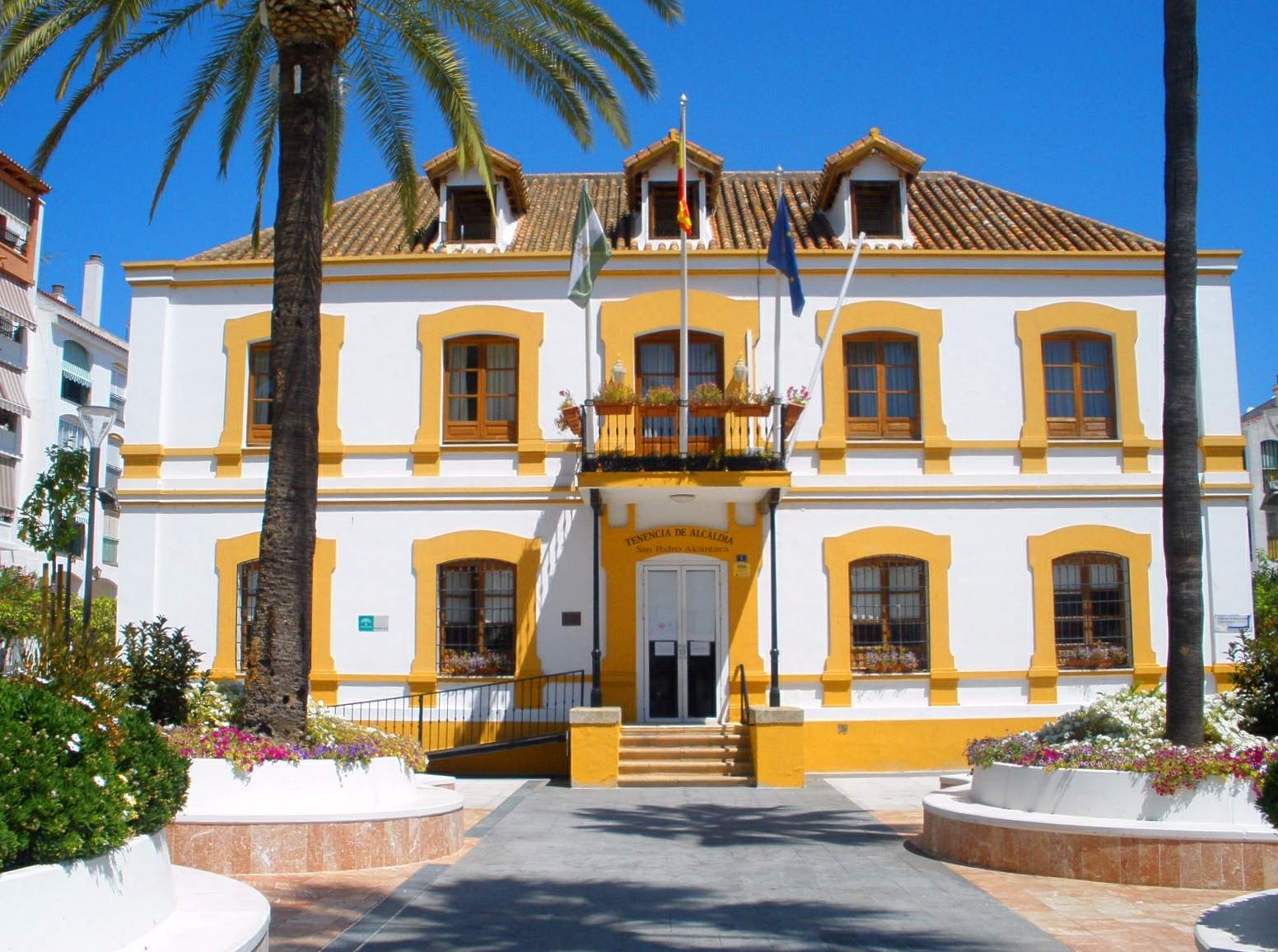
  Villa San Luis, current town council
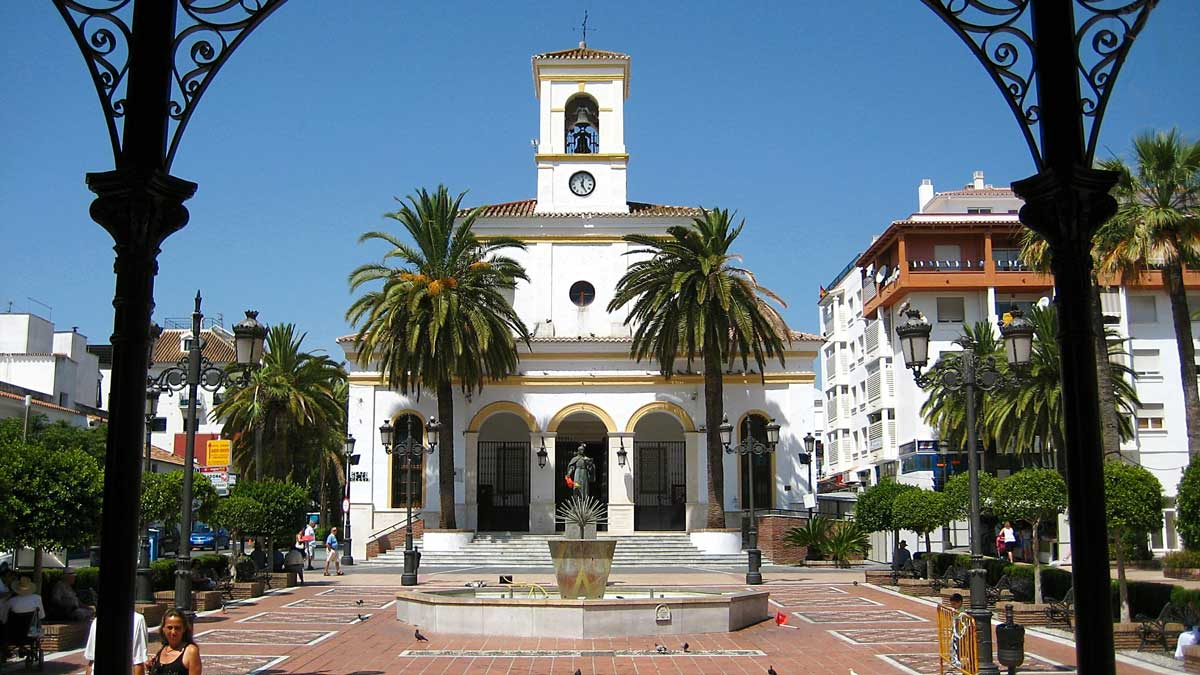
  San Pedro de Alcantara church
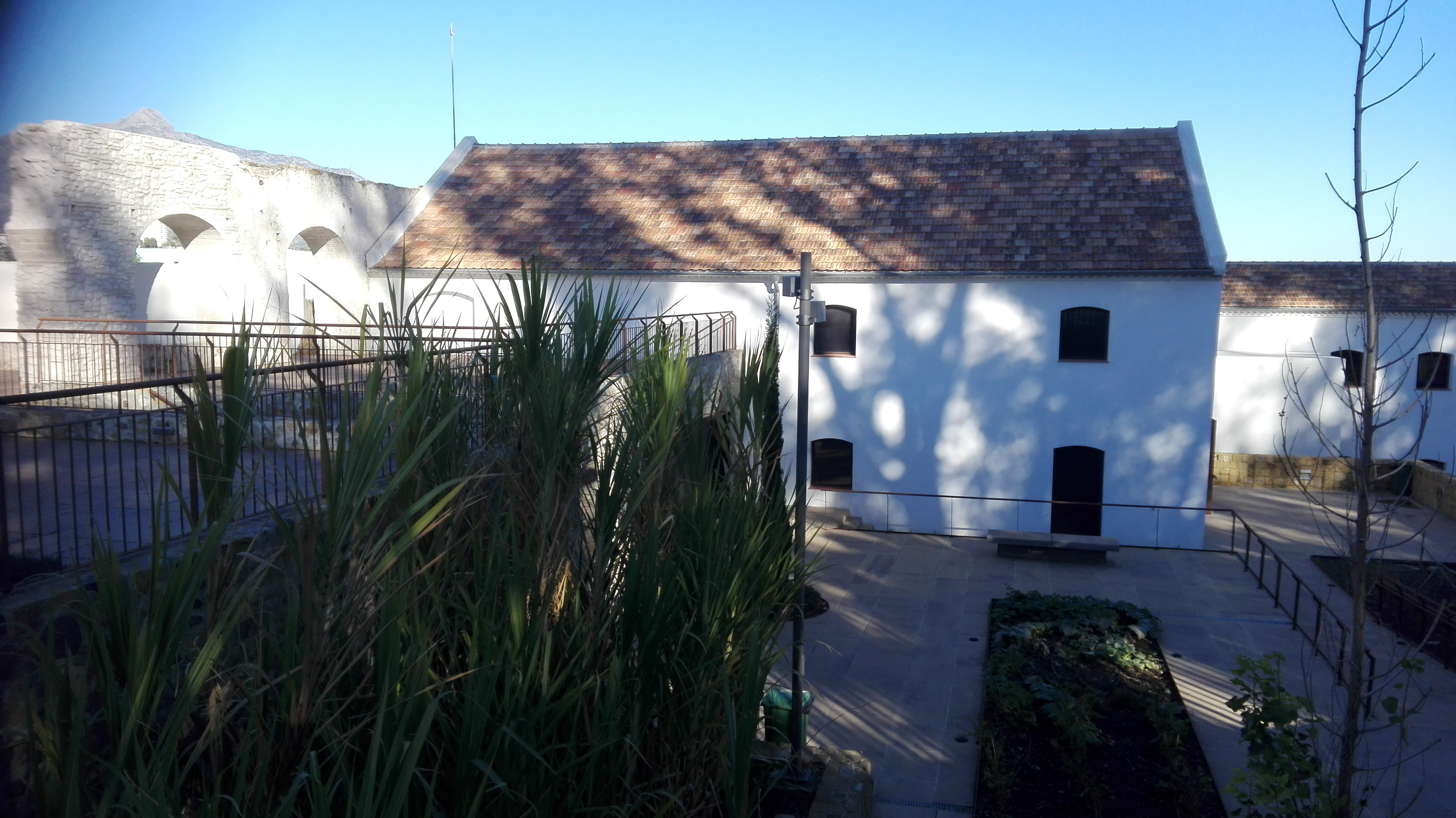
  Farming school, current Trapiche Guadaiza cultural center

== Transport ==
It is served by the A7, motorway and AP7 and A-397 to Ronda. The closest airport is Malaga-Costa del Sol. The nearest recreational ports are Puerto Banús, Estepona and Marbella ports. The closest railway station is Malaga-María Zambrano for high speed railway to Seville and Madrid.

It lies on the coastal road the N340/A7 and can be accessed as well as the toll motorway the AP7, 10 km west of Marbella in Andalucía, Southern Spain.It is easily accessed from either Málaga or Cádiz and via the C339 from Sevilla and Ronda. The nearest airports of Málaga and Gibraltar are both within an hour's drive.

=== Urban bus ===
- L4: Puerto Banús - (El Ángel) - Nueva Andalucía - San Pedro.
- L5: Puerto Banús - El Ángel - Nueva Andalucía - San Pedro - El Salto.
- L7 (circular): San Pedro - Centro de Salud.
- L13: Hospital Costa del Sol - Marbella Centro - San Pedro.

=== Intercity bus ===
San Pedro has connections to domestic destinations such as the major cities in Andalusia.

- L-33 San Pedro - Benahavís
- L-79 Marbella - San Pedro - Estepona
- L-610 Málaga - Airport - Marbella - San Pedro - Estepona - La Línea

== Culture ==
Semana Santa is celebrated in San Pedro de Alcántara, along with other religious celebrations such as Corpus Christi, Virgin of el Rocío, Virgin of Carmel, Carnival, Toston day (roasting chesnuts), Christmas or Three Kings which include small festivals, mass and processions carried out by the neighbours and enjoyed by visitors because of faith, tradition, or curiosity.

In October the Feria de San Pedro de Alcantara honour the patron saint. They last for a week and take place in the fair grounds, former Juan Antonio Roca's Finca de la Caridad andalusian cortijo.

== Education ==
Primary Schools	Secondary Schools	Private Schools
María Teresa León	Guadaiza	Laude San Pedro de Alcantara
Al Ándalus	Salduba	Patrocinio San Jose
Fuente Nueva	Vega de Mar	
Miguel Hernandez		
San Pedro de Alcántara		
