= Sierra de las Nieves (disambiguation) =

Sierra de las Nieves may refer to various places in Spain:

- Sierra de las Nieves, a mountain range of the Penibaetic system
- Sierra de las Nieves Natural Park, a protected area located in the range
- Sierra de las Nieves (comarca), a comarca in Málaga Province, see Córdoba, Spain
