= Marbella blast furnaces =

19th-century Spanish ironworks

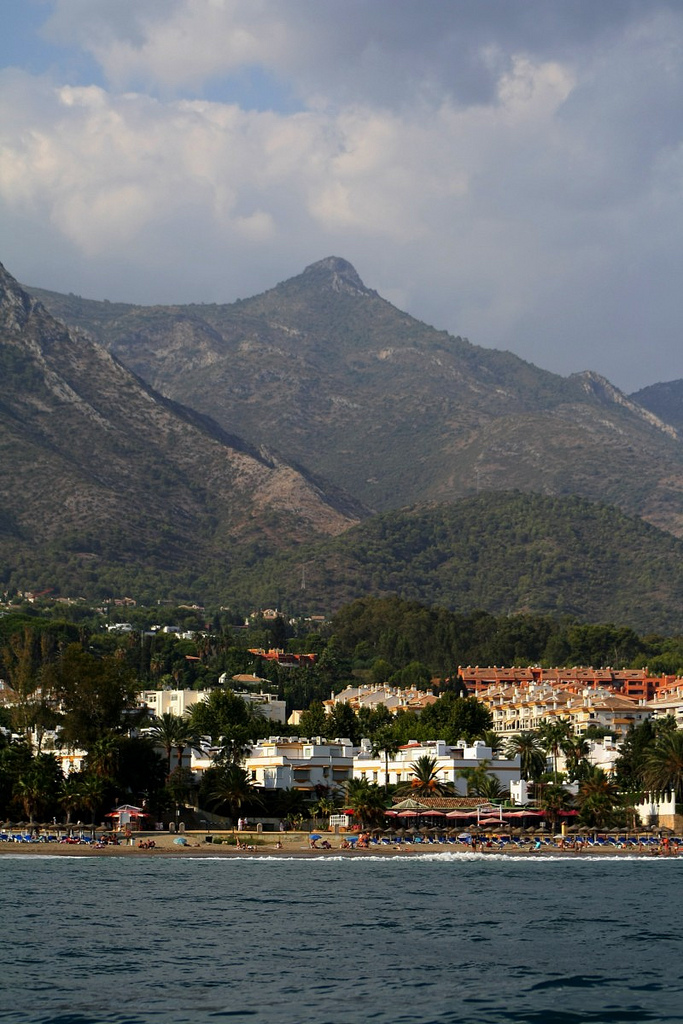
Peak of Cruz de Juanar near Ojén

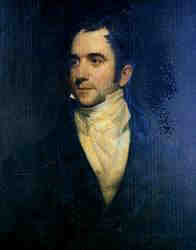
Manuel Agustín Heredia, owner of both the Peñoncillo mines in Ojen, La Concepción in Marbella and La Constancia in Málaga

The Marbella blast furnaces (Spanish: altos hornos de Marbella) were the second iron works in Spain.

The blast furnaces in Marbella were built after the discovery of iron ore deposits in Ojén because of the availability of charcoal in the Sierra Blanca mountain range and the supply of water from the Verde River. In August and September 1826, two societies called La Concepción and El Angel were established, the first promoted by Manuel Agustín Heredia, the second by Joan Giró.

The furnaces at one time accounted for 75 per cent of the iron smelted in Spain, but iron produced in charcoal-fired kilns was much more expensive than that obtained by using coke as fuel; consequently the steel industry in Marbella died out due to competition from the more efficient steel producers of the north.

== History ==
In 1828 Málaga businessman Manuel Heredia founded a company called La Concepción to mine the magnetite iron ores of the Sierra Blanca at nearby Ojén, due to the availability of charcoal made from the trees of the mountain slopes and water from the Verde River, as a ready supply of both was needed for the manufacture of iron. In 1832 the company built the first charcoal-fired blast furnace for non-military use in Spain. Around 1840 the iron-smelting operations based in the province of Málaga ultimately produced up to 75 per cent of Spain´s cast iron, being La Concepción and La Constancia the biggest enterprises of the province. In 1860 the Marqués del Duero founded an agricultural colony, now the heart of San Pedro de Alcántara. The dismantling of the iron industry based in the forges of El Angel and La Concepción occurred simultaneously, disrupting the local economy, as much of the population had to return to farming or fishing for a livelihood. This situation was compounded by the widespread crisis of traditional agriculture, and by the epidemic of phylloxera blight in the vineyards, all of which accounted for Marbella's high unemployment, increase in poverty, and the starvation of many day laborers.

The associated infrastructure built for the installation of the foundry of El Angel in 1871 by the British-owned Marbella Iron Ore Company temporarily relieved the situation, and even made the city a destination for immigrants, increasing its population. However, the company did not survive the worldwide economic crisis of 1893, and closed its doors in that year due to the difficulty of finding a market for the magnetite iron ore removed from its mine.

== Bibliography ==
- García Montoro, C. Málaga en los comienzos de la industrialización: Manuel Agustín Heredia (1786–1846), 1978.
- Fernández, Álvarez y Portillo, Siderurgia malagueña en el siglo XIX. M.A.H.
