= Tolox =

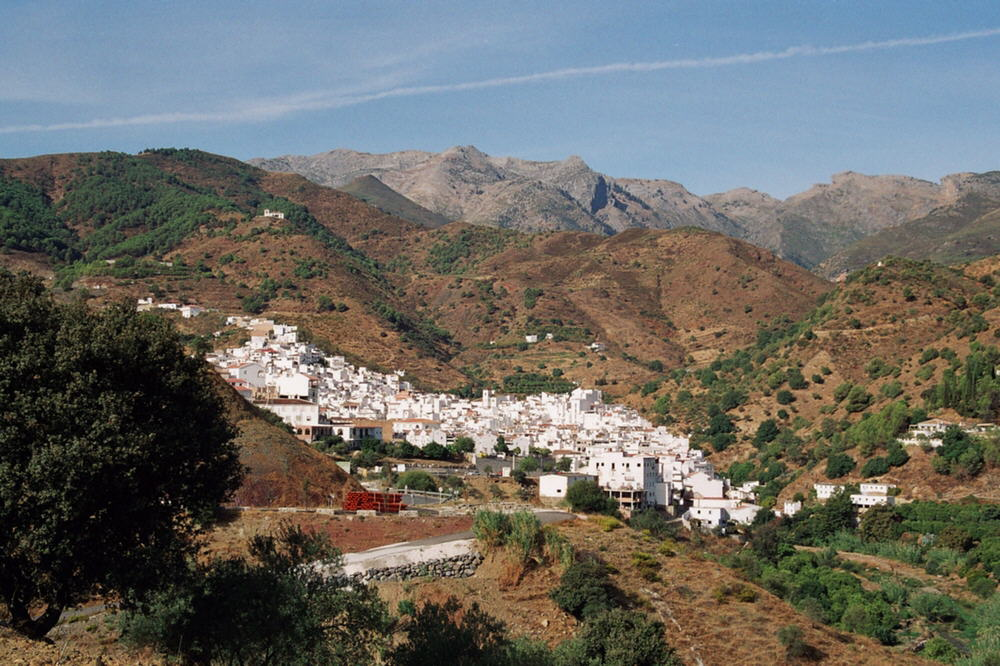

- Flag Coat of arms

- Location of Tolox in Spain
- Coordinates: 36°42′N 4°54′W
- Sovereign state: Spain
- Autonomous community: Andalusia
- Province: Málaga

Area
  - Total: 94 km^{2} (36 sq mi)
- Elevation: 285 m (935 ft)

Population (2025-01-01)
  - Total: 2,468
  - Density: 26/km^{2} (68/sq mi)
- Time zone: UTC+1 (CET)
  - Summer (DST): UTC+2 (CEST)
- Website: www.tolox.es

Tolox is a town and municipality in the province of Málaga in the autonomous community of Andalusia in southern Spain. The municipality has a population of 2,317 (2006). It is situated in the centre of the Sierra de las Nieves National Park at the foot of the Sierra Blanca and the Sierra Parda. In addition to La Torrecilla (1,919 m.), there are ancient woodlands of Spanish fir and gall oak. The municipality covers 94 km^{2}, has a mean elevation of 285 m. and mean geographical coordinates of 36° 41' 11" N, 4° 54' 16" E. The channel of the Rio Grande flows through the town from northeast to south.

== Village ==
The village of Tolox has winding streets, with white-washed houses and doors and window boxes overflowing with flowers in season.

== History ==
While the area was inhabited in Paleolithic times, the village of Tolox bears a Phoenician name and a Phoenician origin is confirmed by archaeological evidence. It was occupied by Rome and considerable rebuilding was done under Roman rule. Later it fell to the Visigoths and then to the Umayyad Arab invaders. Tolox was freed from Córdoba rule in 883 by Umar ibn Hafsun, who developed it to one of his main bases in the Serranía de Ronda. It did not fall until 921 when his son Süleyman surrendered it to Abd-ar-Rahman III.

After the fall of the Caliphate of Córdoba, Tolox came under the Kingdom of Granada and it was not turned over to Ferdinand and Isabella, Los Reyes Católicos ("The Catholic Monarchs") until 1485 by Sancho de Angula. Tolox continued to have a large Moorish population and at Christmas 1539 there was civil strife between the predominantly Moorish peasants and the Christian landholders. Each year during Carnival Tolox commemorates these events with the "Dia de los polvos", ("Day of the Powder"). In 1568-1571 Tolox took part in the Moorish rebellion. As a result, Tolox was almost entirely depopulated first by the war, and then any remaining Moors were relocated in small groups to Valencia. Philip II then called for Christian settlers from Seville, Córdoba, and as far away as Galicia.

In the War of Independence Tolox fought under the command of Francisco Javier Abadía (commander of the Campo de Gibraltar) against the invading Napoleonic troops. Later soldiers from Cártama and Tolox under the command of General Francisco Ballesteros conducted guerrilla warfare out of the mountains against the French.

== Attractions ==
Aside from the mountain vistas and hiking that Tolox offers, it has a spa, the "Fuente Amargosa", which is visited for respiratory and allergic afflictions.

== See also ==
- List of municipalities in Málaga
