= Ibn Habib =

Andalusian Arab polymath (796–853)

- إبن حبيب
- Born: c. 796; Hisn Wat, Emirate of Cordoba
- Died: c. 853; Cordoba

Academic work
- Era: Islamic Golden Age, al-Andalus
- Main interests: History, fiqh, grammar, genealogy, medicine

Abū Marwān ʿAbd al-Malik ibn Ḥabīb al-Sulami (Arabic: أبو مروان عبدالملك بن حبيب السلمي) (180–238 AH) (796–853 CE) also known as Ibn Habib, was a Andalusian polymath of the 9th century. His interests included medicine, fiqh, history, grammar, and genealogy and he was reportedly the first to write a book on medicine in al-Andalus. By virtue of his exceptional knowledge he became known as the scholar of Spain.

== Biography ==
Ibn Habib was born in Hisn Wāt (identified with modern-day town of Huetor Vega) a village near the city of Granada in the year 790. He claimed descent from the Arab tribe of Banu Sulaym, hence he took the nisba al-Sulami. His father was attar (عطار; 'druggist or perfumer'), likewise, Ibn Habib worked as a druggist alongside his father. He first studied in Elvira and then moved to continue his studies in the city of Cordoba, which at the time, was the capital of the Umayyad Emirate of Cordoba. In the year 822/3, Ibn Habib went on to perform the Hajj to Mecca with the financial support of his father. After performing the pilgrimage he stayed to study the Maliki school of fiqh in Medina and Egypt, there he studied under Ibn Abd al-Hakam and Abdallāh ibn al-Mubarak. Ibn Habib died after an illness in 853 and was buried in the Umm Salama cemetery in Cordoba. He left two sons: Muhammad and Ubaid Allah and an unnamed daughter.

== Works ==
- al-Wadiha (الواضحة; Compendium of Maliki Law)
- Gharib al-hadith (غريب الحديث)
- Tafsīr al-Muwaṭṭaʾ (تفسير الموطأ; Explanation of the Muwatta')
- Hurub al-Islam (حروب الإسلام; Wars of Islam)
- Adab al-Nisa' (أدب النساء; Ethics of Women )
- As-Samāʿ (السماء; The Sky)
- Tabaqat al-Fuqaha' wa Tabi'in (طبقات الفقهاء والتابعين; Classes of the Fuqaha and Tabi'un)
- Al-Taʾrīkh (التأريخ; Chronicles)
- Kitāb al-Waraʿ (كتاب الورع; Book of Piety)
- Waṣf al-Firdaws (وصف الفردوس; Description of Heaven)
- Mukhtaṣar fī al-ṭibb (مختصر في الطب; Compendium on Medicine)

== See also ==
- List of pre-modern Arab scientists and scholars
- Medicine in the medieval Islamic world
