= Elviria =

Coordinates: 36°30′09″N 4°47′01″W

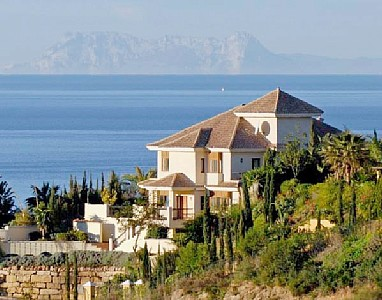
- Interactive map of Elviria
- Country: Spain
- Autonomous community: Andalusia
- Province: Málaga
- Comarca: Costa del Sol Occidental

Elviria is an ruralisation on the Costa del Sol, 6 km (4 mi) from the old town of Marbella, Andalucia. The nearest airport is located in Málaga at a 45 km (27 mi) distance and the nearest train station in Fuengirola. Elviria is a lively low density residential areas with amenities. As the center of Marbella East it has shopping facilities, restaurants and bars. The area is covered with vegetation, mostly native pine trees and cork oaks. Elviria is a villa area with some low rise luxury apartment complexes between the villas.

Elviria is a ten-minute drive from the centre of Marbella, and is close to the many amenities of the aforementioned town.

The Elviria hills (La Mairena and El Soto de Marbella) offer views towards the Sierra Nevada, the Mediterranean Sea, the Rock of Gibraltar and the African coast. The village is surrounded by a UNESCO biosphere reserve called La Sierra de las Nieves.

== Education and Health ==
Elviria has three international private schools on its territory: the German Hoffman college, ECOS (both in La Mairena), as well as the English International College. Close at hand are the Hospital Costa del Sol, and numerous private clinics.

== Hotels and sport facilities ==
Three golf courses are located in Elviria: Santa Maria Golf & Country Club, Greenlife Golf Club and El Soto Golf & Country Club. Tennis is also popular in this area and there are courts at the Don Carlos hotel and the Hoffman Tennis Academy in La Mairena.

Elviria has five hotels, three of which are five-star hotels: Marriott's Marbella Beach Resort, Don Carlos Leisure Resort & Spa, and Vincci Seleccion Estrella del Mar.

In 2016, an investment fund based in Hong Kong announced that it had acquired 170,000 square metres of land and planned to invest EUR 300 million to develop a five-star luxury hotel and 120 villas. According to its developer, the future resort "is to be the most luxurious in the country" and will be run by an international hotel chain.

== Shopping, restaurants and other facilities ==
Elviria includes its own shopping mall, very busy throughout the year and offering a wide range of international restaurants such as restaurant El Lago, a Michelin-starred restaurant since 2005, bars, shops, banks, supermarkets, hairdressers, etc.

== Notable residents ==
- Julio Iglesias, singer
- David Rodriguez Lomeña, Bullfighter
