= La Torrecilla =

Mountain in Spain

Torrecilla
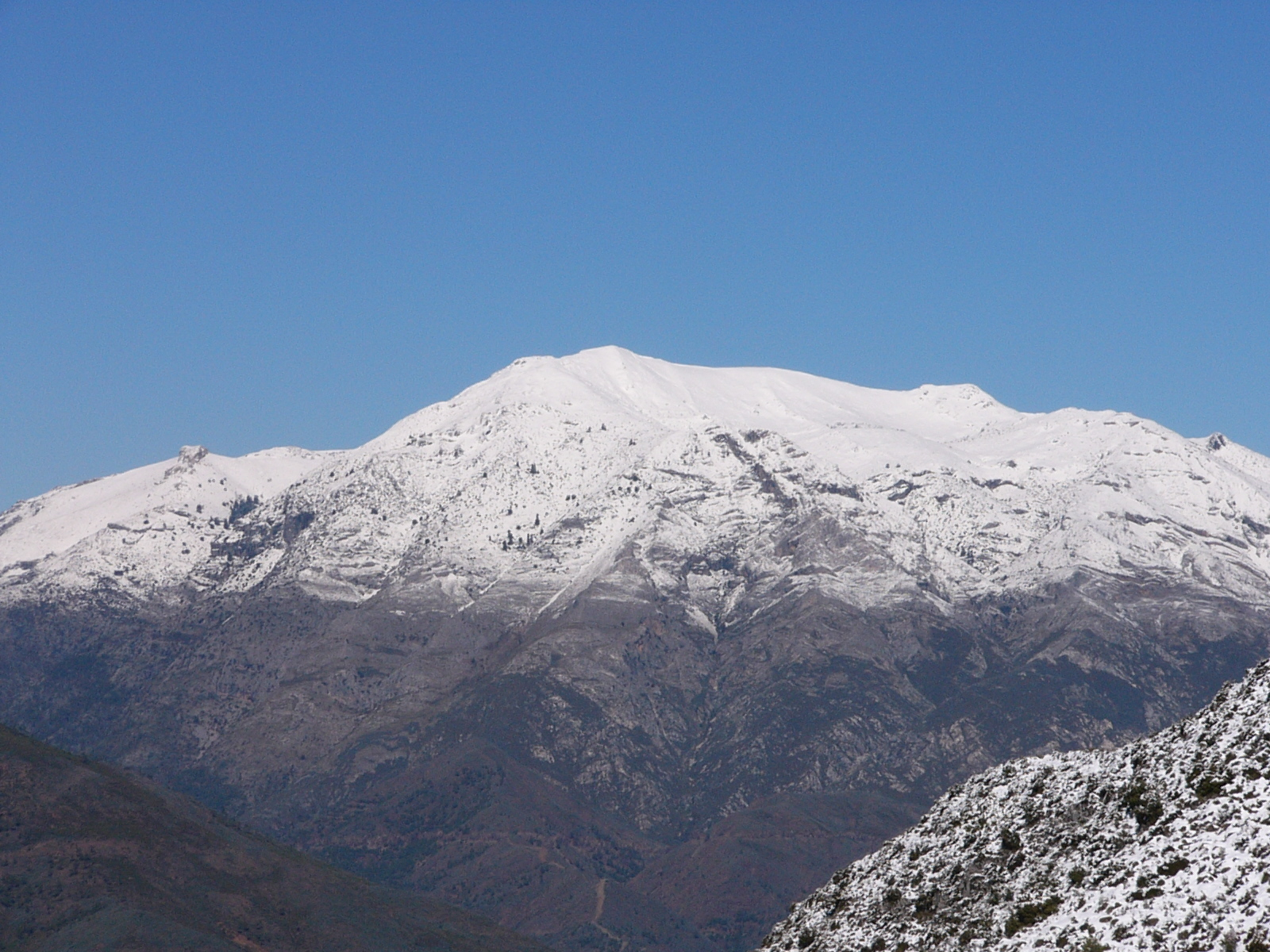

Highest point
- Elevation: 1,918 m (6,293 ft)
- Prominence: 1,467 m (4,813 ft)
- Listing: Ribu
- Coordinates: 36°40′33″N 4°59′47″W

Geography
- Location within Spain
- Location: Province of Málaga
- Parent range: Cordillera Penibética

La Torrecilla is a mountain with a height of 1,919 m (6,296 ft), which lies southeast of Ronda in the Sierra de las Nieves Natural Park, of the Sierra de las Nieves range in the province of Málaga, Andalucia, Spain.
