= Sierra Blanca (Andalusia) =

Mountain range in Málaga Province, Andalusia, Spain

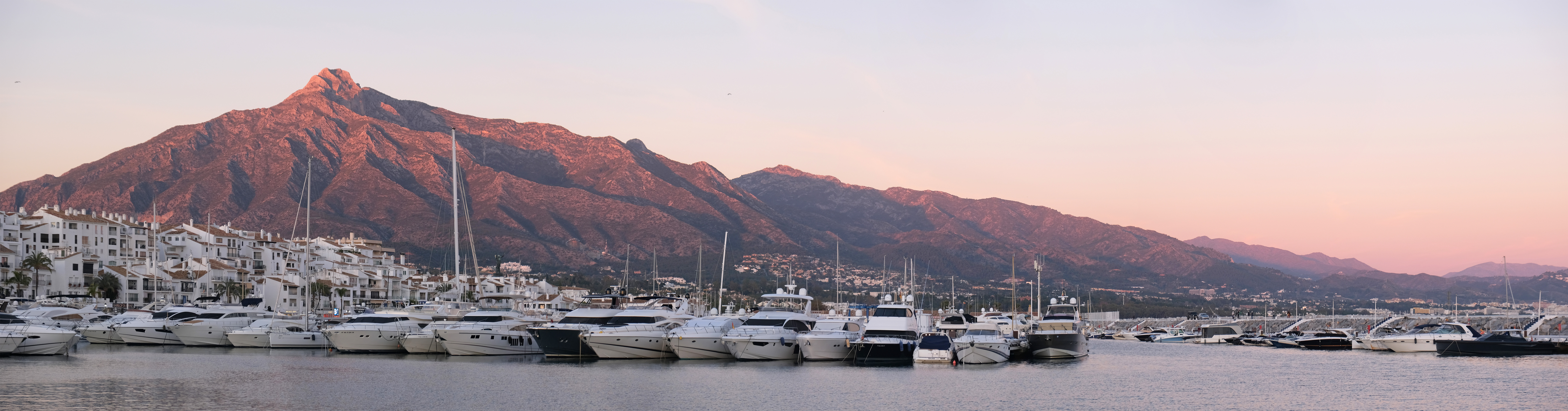
- View of the Sierra Blanca from Puerto Banús

Highest point
- Peak: Pico del Lastonar
- Elevation: 1,275 m (4,183 ft)
- Coordinates: 36°34′0″N 04°54′0″W

Geography
- Location within Spain
- Location: Málaga Province, Andalusia
- Country: Spain
- Parent range: Penibaetic System

Geology
- Orogeny: Alpine orogeny
- Rock type: Karstic

Sierra Blanca is a mountain range of the Penibaetic System in Málaga Province, Andalusia, Spain. Its highest point is the 1,275 m high Pico del Lastonar. It is the closest mountain to Marbella.

The Sierra Blanca, meaning 'White Range', is named after the lack of vegetation on its slopes which leaves the pale grey limestone rock exposed.

== Geography ==
This karstic mountain range is part of the ranges fringing the Mediterranean coastline in the Costa del Sol area. It is located between the coast and the Sierra de las Nieves in the municipal terms of Istán, Ojén, Marbella and Monda. The easiest route to reach it is from Marbella town.

The Pico de la Concha (1,270 m), meaning 'Seashell Peak', resembles a seashell seen from the west and is the second highest summit of the range. Other notable peaks are the Salto del Lobo (1,225 m), Cerro de la Zarina (1,141 m) and the Cruz de Juanar (1,178 m).

Ecologist organizations in the area have proposed that the Sierra Blanca be declared a protected area, in a similar manner as the Sierra de las Nieves Natural Park located in the neighboring range.

== See also ==
- Baetic System
- Geology of the Iberian Peninsula
- Marbella blast furnaces
- List of Sites of Community Importance in Spain
