= Guaro, Málaga =

Guaro
- City and municipality
- Villa de Guaro
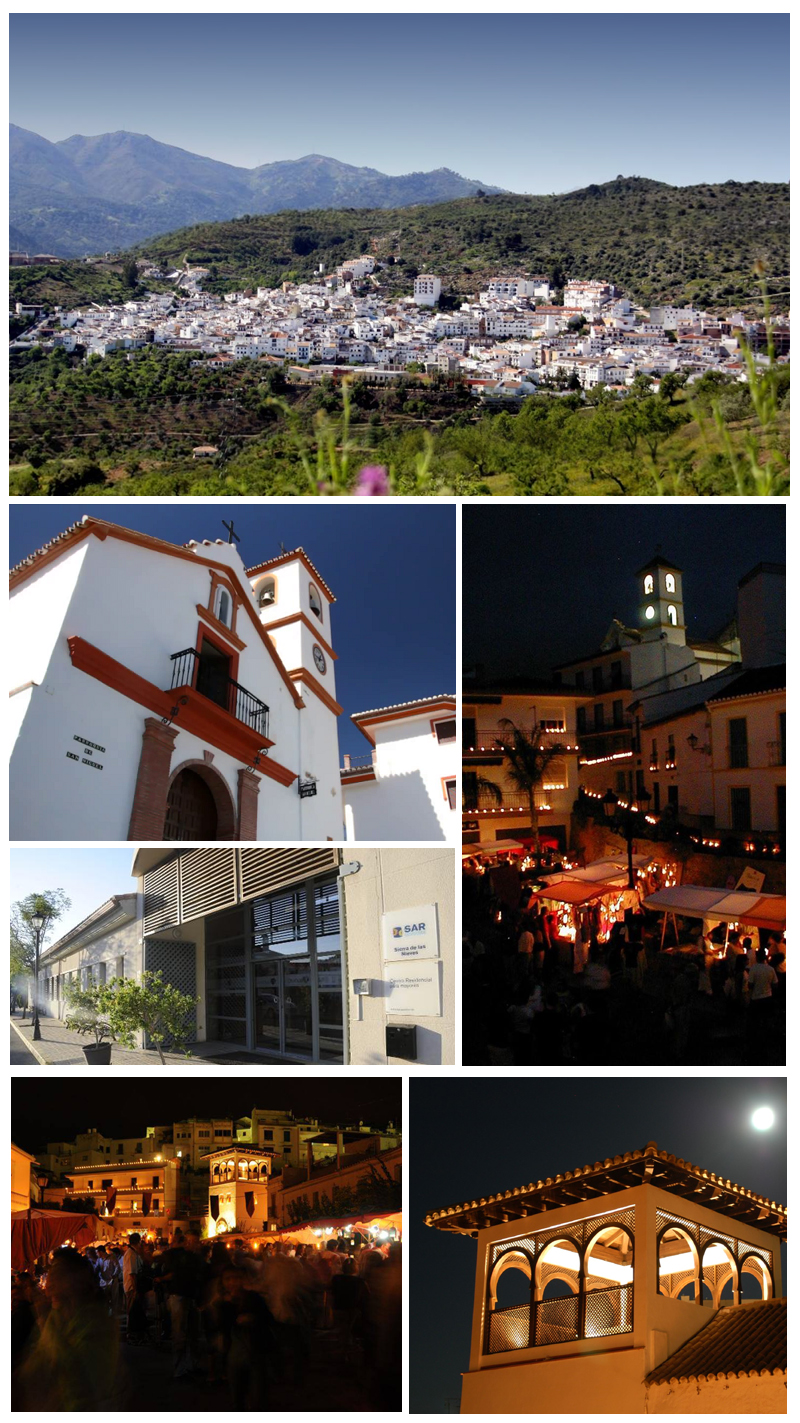

- Coat of arms

- Coordinates: 36°39′32″N 4°50′13″O
- Country: Spain
- Andalucia: Sierra de las Nieves

Government
  - Mayor: José Antonio Carabantes (Ciudadanos)

Area
  - Urban: 22 km^{2} (8.5 sq mi)
- Elevation: 354 m (1,161 ft)

Population (2011 census)
  - Urban: 2,260
  - Urban density: 100/km^{2} (270/sq mi)
- Time zone: UTC+1 (CET)
  - Summer (DST): UTC+2 (CEST)
- Postal code: 29108
- Area code: +34 952
- Website: www.guaro.es

Guaro is a municipality in the province of Málaga in Andalusia, southern Spain. It has a population of 2,228 and belongs to the Valle de Guadalhorce comarca. It is 44 kilometres from the provincial capital of Málaga and 20 kilometres from Marbella.

Located in a fertile land for fruit—almonds and olives—between the Rio Grande valley and the mountains, Guaro is the entrance to the Sierra de las Nieves Natural Park. It has been declared a Biosphere Reserve by UNESCO and is situated next to the third national park in Andalusia.

== Geography ==
Guaro is at an altitude of 354 metres above sea level near the Sierra de Mijas. The land area is 22 square kilometres. Guaro's main economical activities are olive and almond agriculture, along with other traditional irrigated crops, and oddly-enough, as of 2006 the number of women with work contracts doubled that of men.

== History ==
Prehistoric remains have been found dating back to the earliest humans in the area in prehistory, although the nucleus of the population is found with the entry of the Arabs in the south of the peninsula.

The first settlement in the area dates from Arabic times and was located at the place known as Old Guaro, at the feet of a tower that once was part of the line of fortifications of Guadalhorce valley. The municipality was conquered by the Catholic Monarchs in 1485. Guaro became an independent village on 1614 by decree of King Philip IV of Spain. The city is notable for its typical Andalus streets lined with white houses festooned with flowers. Its main monument is Saint Michel's parish, built in the 16th century and reformed in the early 17th century by Pedro Días de Palacios, that exhibits a square, two-bodied tower and no lateral vessels.

== Monuments & Museum ==
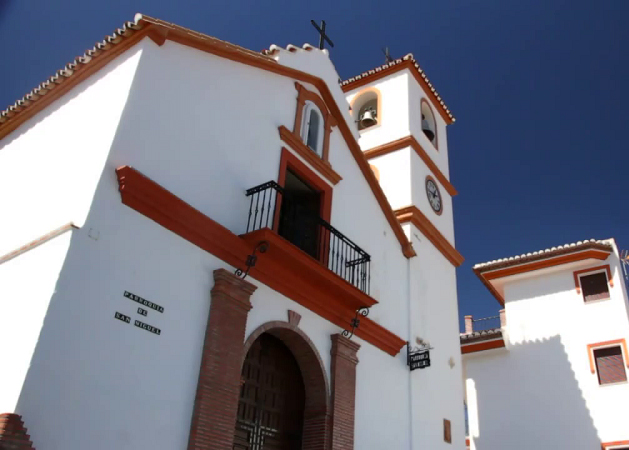
Church of San Miguel Arcángel, Guaro

The parish church of San Miguel Arcángel is one of the most important monuments in Guaro. This temple is located in the center of the old town a few meters from the Town Hall and the San Isidro Labrador Fountain. It was built on an old mosque in 1505 and renovated up to two times. It has a Latin cross plan without the side naves, on the facade you will find the image of San Miguel and, on its right, the bell tower.

Two other religious buildings are the hermitages of Cruz del Puerto and San Isidro, the latter located next to the Rio Grande in a place of eucalyptus. Inside the Cruz del Puerto hermitage is the Cristo de Limpias.

Al-Andalus Cultural Center and its Ethnographic Oil Museum, which houses an Arab oil press from the 12th century. The objective of this space is to highlight the value of the municipality as a traditional olive producer since the Al-Andalus period. Also on the same theme, the Marmolejo Oil Museum has a collection of tools and machinery from the old Guaro mills.

== Events ==
The town of Guaro holds a very special event every year: the Luna Mora Festival. Over two days, the town's streets are lit up with over 25,000 candles and Arabic and Andalusian music as the backdrop.

The Luna Mora Festival in Guaro also includes a full programme of activities: workshops, exhibitions, story telling for the kids, bazaars and food markets. There is also a series of concerts held in the Luna Mora Auditorium.

== See also ==
- List of municipalities in Málaga
