= Powder Day =

Tradition in the Spanish village Tolox

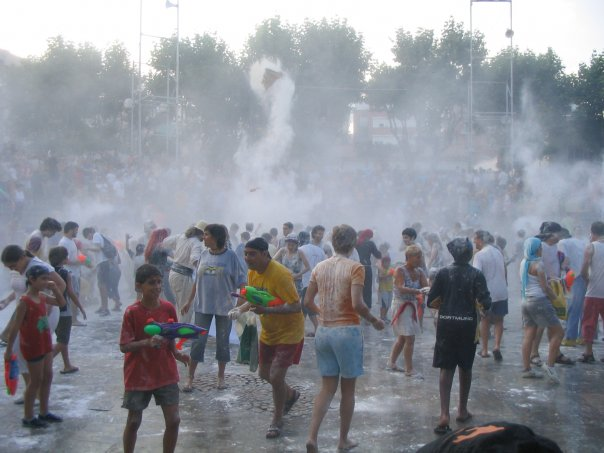
Powder Day is the final day of the Tolox carnival.

Powder Day or Day of the Powder (Spanish: Día de los Polvos) is celebrated in the southern Spanish village of Tolox on Shrove Tuesday, the final day of the annual Tolox carnival. This local tradition involves the throwing of talcum powder at one another.

One reason given for the custom is that it takes place the day before Ash Wednesday, on which the priest declares to the faithful "Remember, man, that you are dust, and unto dust you shall return".

A more likely origin of the tradition is said to have its roots in a Christian/Moorish riot in the 16th century when Tolox, then under Christian control, had a large Moorish population. During Christmas of 1539 there was civil strife between the predominantly Moorish peasants and the Christian landholders. One chronicler states that this custom originated in a dispute between a Moorish and a Christian girl who were in love with the same man. Both worked in a bakery and as the argument grew more heated, they ended up throwing all the flour they could find at each other.

In years gone by, the custom evolved that young men wanting to request their girlfriends' hand in marriage would throw flour at them. Girls not wishing be subjected to this would refrain from going out on the streets, forcing the boys to come up with ingenious ways to powder their target. A young man would dust his hands with flour and try to enter a young girl's house and smother her face with flour. If doors and windows were closed, it meant he was not desired by the girl. If the lad was still keen, he had to smartly outwit her by climbing to the roof or breaking windows and doors to get her smeared with the flour, thus winning her heart in a symbolic way, or simply to impress her.

Nowadays this tradition especially appeals to the young people who hurl talcum powder instead of flour at each other, without preference or distinction as to gender or origin, until they are completely covered with it. Many outsiders come to Tolox to take part in this peculiar fiesta. Up to 3,000 kilograms have been known to be thrown in the village.

A similar custom takes place in Alozaina, in which hundreds of people celebrate the "hariná", in remembrance of the times when their ancestors covered young women with wheat flour from the mills to show their love.

== See also ==
- Holi, an unrelated yet similar Indian custom
- List of holidays by country
