= Guadalmina =

River in Spain

Rio Guadalmina
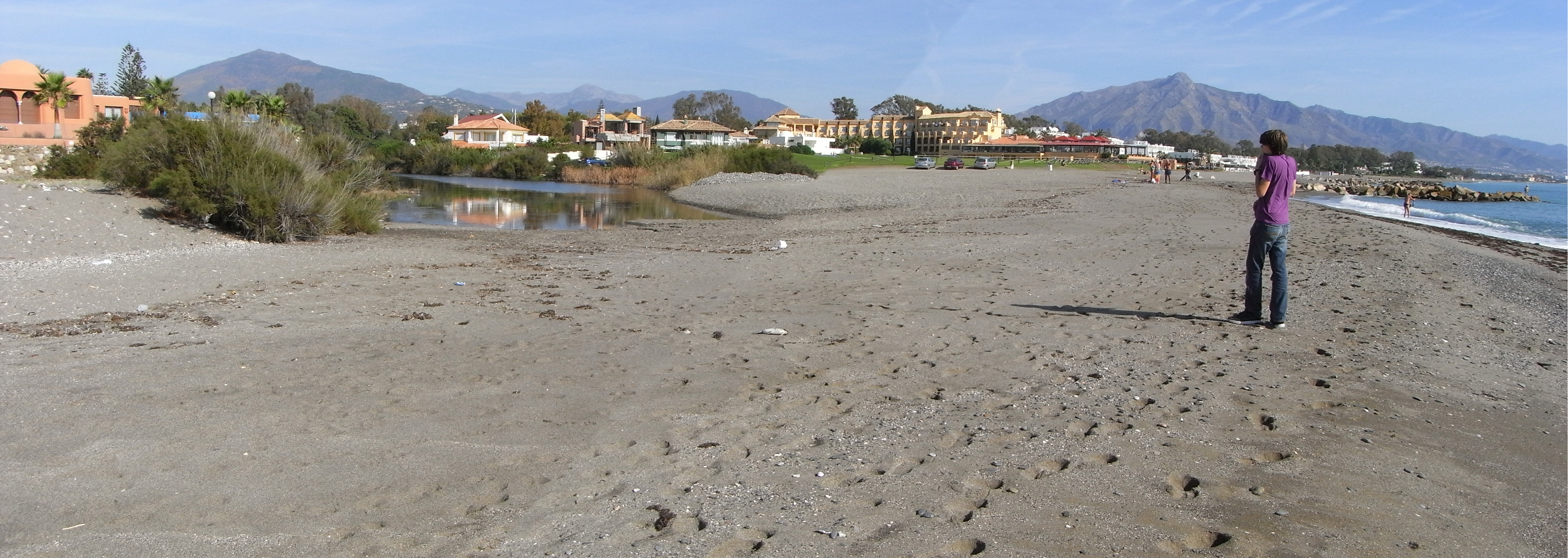
- Mouth of the Guadalmina River between Marbella and Estepona

Location
- Country: Spain

Physical characteristics
- Source
  - location: Igualeja, Sierra Bermeja, Spain
- Mouth
  - location: Mediterranean Sea, Málaga, Spain
  - coordinates: 36°27′36″N 5°0′19″W
  - elevation: 0 m (0 ft)
- Length: 28 km (17 mi)
- Discharge
  - location: mouth

The river Guadalmina (from the Arabic for "Wadi (river) of the port") is a short coastal river of the Mediterranean basin in southern Spain that runs entirely within the Andalusian province of Málaga.

Only 28 kilometres (17 mi) in length, the Guadalmina rises in the Sierra Bermeja, in the municipality of Igualeja, but its main course begins below the mountains in the municipality of Benahavís, forming a karst aquifer in an area known as Las Angosturas (the narrows). The river flows into the municipality of Marbella near San Pedro de Alcántara, and serves to delimit its border from that of the municipality of Estepona.

The Guadalmina was formerly of defensive strategic importance for the people of Marbella; its waters also served to power watermills for grinding grain into flour. The La Concepción reservoir is the primary water source for this municipality; it is formed by a diversion dam on the Río Verde, where the waters of the rivers Guadalmina, Guadalmansa and Guadaiza join and are captured, then transported to provide the water supply of the Costa del Sol towns of Benalmadena, Fuengirola, Mijas, Benahavís, Marbella, Casares and Manilva.

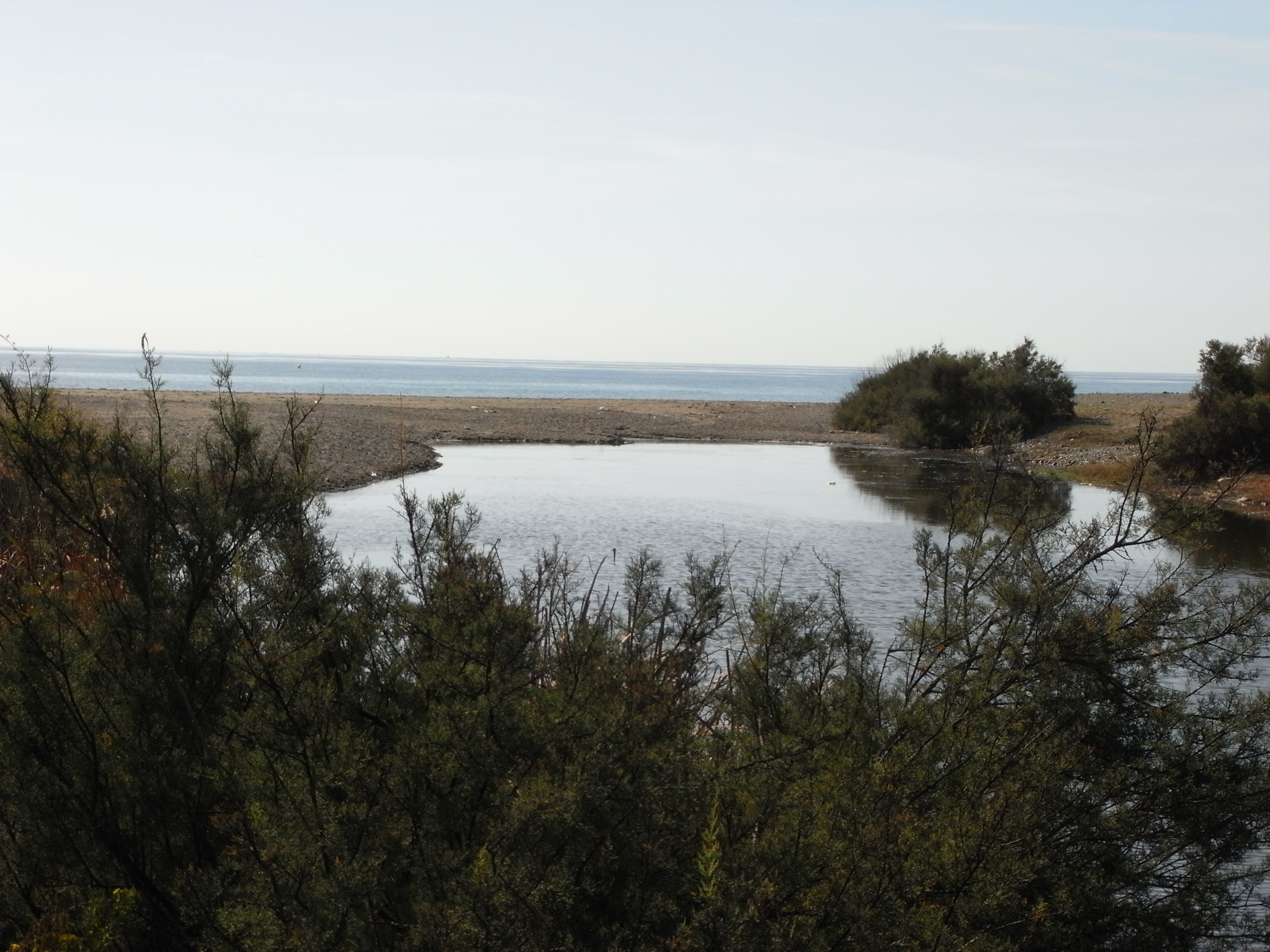
Mouth of the River Guadalmina

The lower course of the river is heavily urbanized; many homes there have a high risk of inundation.

Near the river's mouth, next to San Pedro de Alcántara, are the important archaeological sites of the early 4th-century Christian church Basílica de Vega del Mar, the 3rd-century vaulted Roman baths of Las Bóvedas (the Domes) and the eponymous watch tower of Torre de Las Bóvedas.
