= Benahavís =

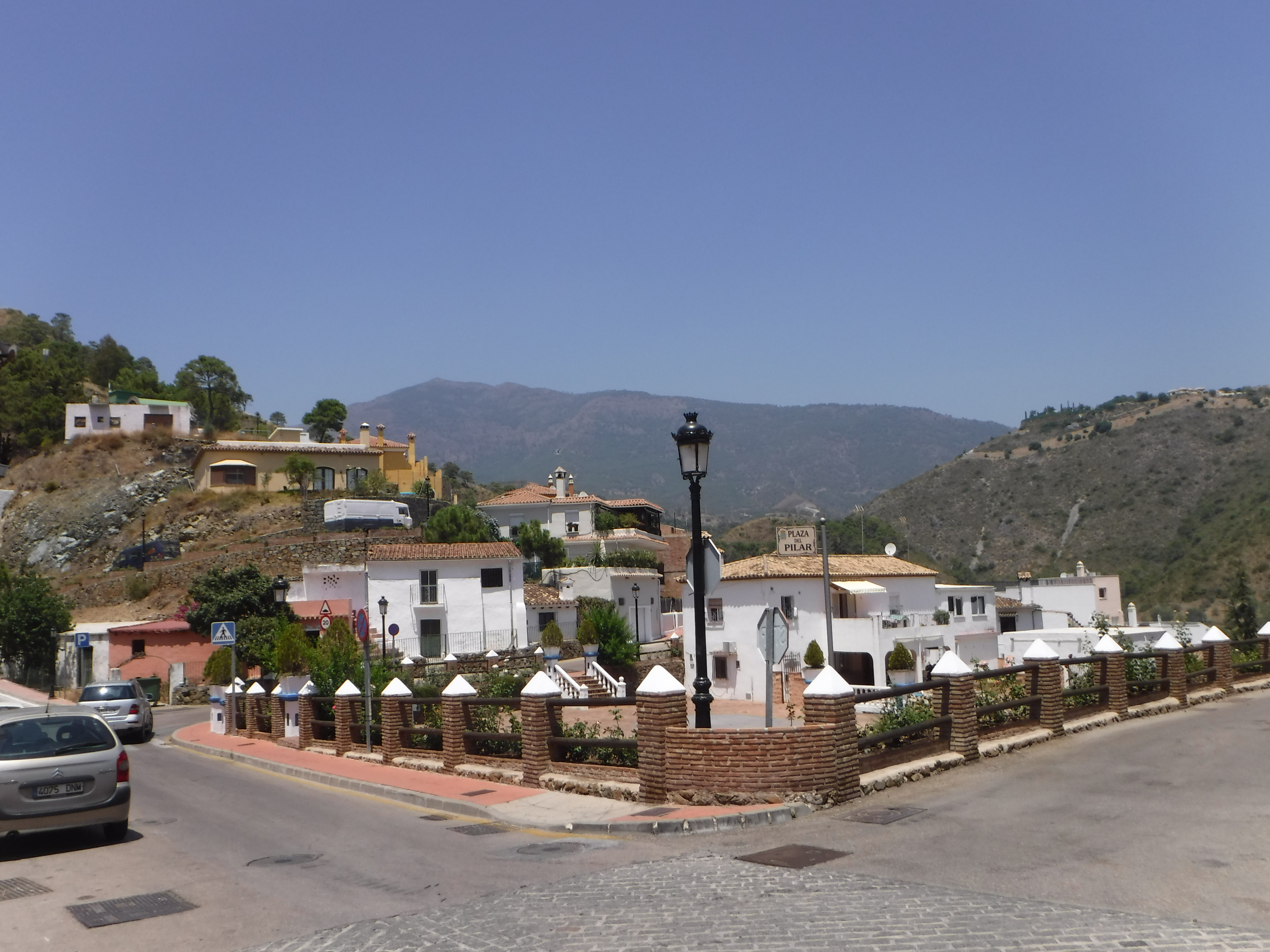

- Coat of arms

- Location in the Province of Málaga Location in Andalusia Location in Spain
- Coordinates: 36°31′08.3″N 5°02′43.6″W
- Sovereign state: Spain
- Autonomous community: Andalusia
- Province: Málaga
- Comarca: Costa del Sol Occidental

Area
  - Total: 145 km^{2} (56 sq mi)
- Elevation: 150 m (490 ft)

Population (2025-01-01)
  - Total: 9,472
  - Density: 65.3/km^{2} (169/sq mi)
- Time zone: UTC+1 (CET)
  - Summer (DST): UTC+2 (CEST)
- Website: www.benahavis.es
- benahavis.net benahavis.com

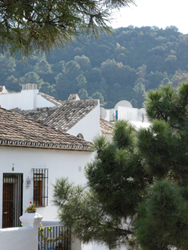

Benahavís is a Spanish town (pueblo) and municipality in the province of Malaga. It is a mountain village between Marbella, Estepona, and Ronda, 7 kilometers (4.3 mi) from the coast.

On the southern face of La Serranía de Ronda mountain range, Benahavís is one of the most mountainous villages on the western Costa del Sol, near the resort beaches as well as the spectacular mountains of the Serrania de Ronda. Its terrain is traversed by the Guadalmina, Guadaiza and Guadalmansa Rivers. Places of great natural and historic interest are to be found within its boundaries, such as El Cerro del Duque, Daidin and the Montemayor Castle.

During the late 1990s, the Junta de Andalucia constructed a dam on the site of an old marble quarry, and now for much of the year the once ever-flowing Río Guadalmina is a dried-up riverbed.

== See also ==
- List of municipalities in Málaga

== History ==
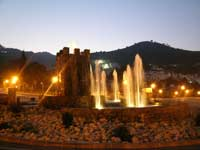

At the end of the 11th century, Benahavís was founded by Arabs. The village was intimately involved with Andalusia's Arabic past, and particularly with Marbella, the municipal district to which it belonged until it was granted the so-called "Carta Puebla" by Philip II in 1572. Montemayor Castle, built prior to the founding of Benahavís, played an important role in disputes between successive Arab rulers in Andalusia, because of its strategic position. It was disputed for many years by the various military factions of the time. Its prominent location overlooking the coast, with up to a hundred kilometres of seaboard visible in clear weather, and even the African coast, was extremely useful at a time when piracy and invasion were commonplace. The town takes its name from Havis, an 11th-century Moorish prince who reigned in Montemayor Castle. The name Benahavís is derived from the Arabic "Binā' Ḥabīsh" (بناء حبيش), meaning "The Building of Ḥabīsh", the word 'Ḥabīsh' could have come from the Arabic word 'Ḥabashi' (حبشي), which meant Ethiopian, but was used to identify any dark-skinned African, this could indicate that the city was founded by a man of Sub-Saharan African descent.

The castle's strategic location drew the attention of the Catholic Monarchs, who were intent on conquering the last Moorish kingdoms in the south of the Iberian Peninsula. Isabel and Ferdinand's forces had already laid siege to the Nazarite kingdom of Granada, but they decided first to occupy the nearby province of Málaga. Soon after, on 11 June 1485, Benahavís, together with the localities of Daidin, Montemayor Castle, Cortes Fortress, Ojen, Arboto, Almáchar, Tramores and Calalui Fort (the Castle of Light), in the Sierra Bermeja, all within the district of Marbella, were handed over to King Ferdinand the Catholic, by Mohammed Abuneza after the signing of the capitulation.

The Catholic Monarchs entrusted their custody to Don Pedro Villandrado, Count of Ribadeo, the first Christian mayor of Benahavís. From that moment on, a dispute arose between Benahavís and Marbella which lasted three and a half centuries, until Benahavís achieved the status of an independent community.
