= Las Bóvedas (thermae) =

Spanish name for remains of some local Roman baths

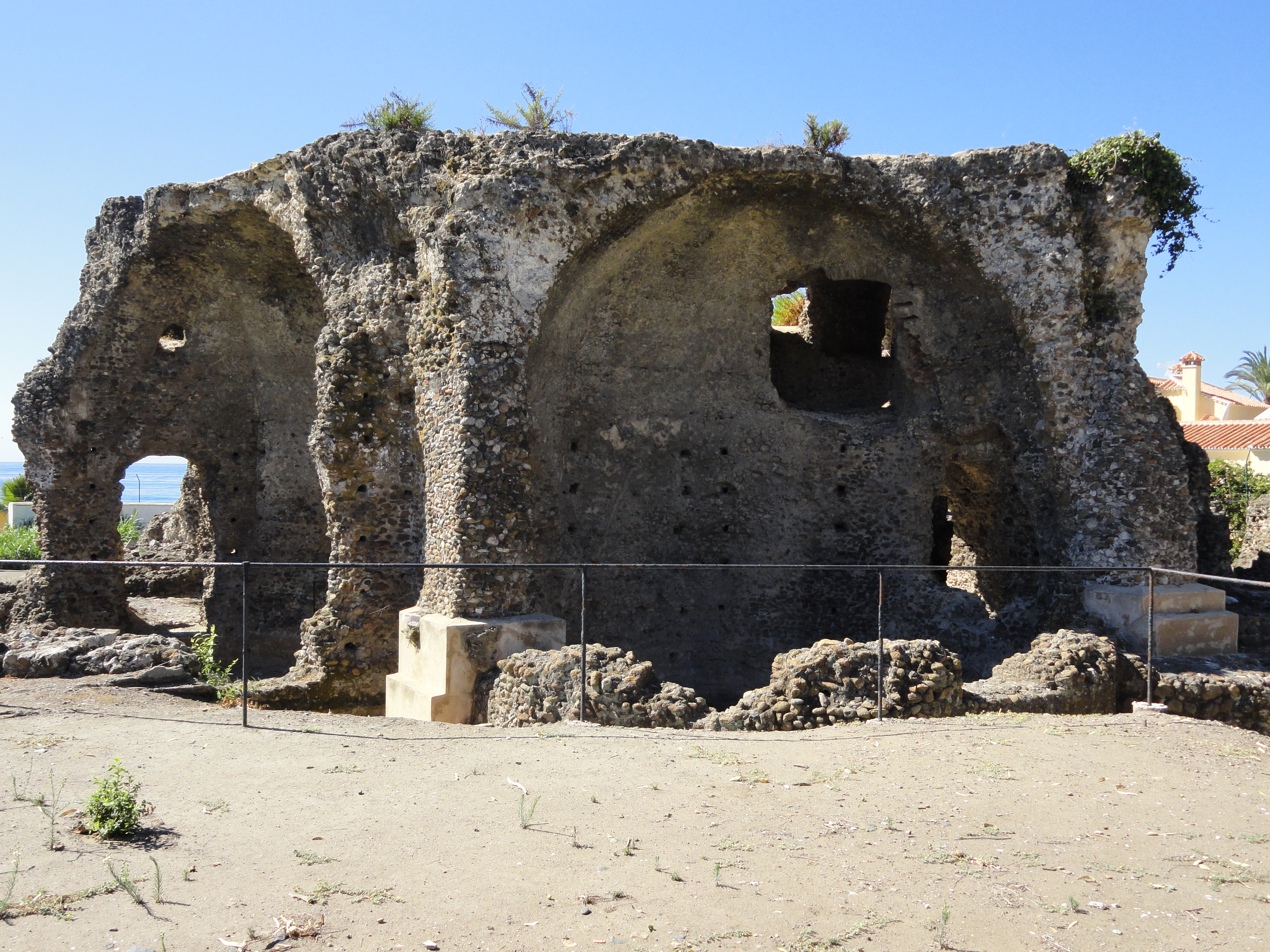

Las Bóvedas (the domes) is the local name for the remains of some Roman baths near San Pedro de Alcántara in Andalusia, Southern Spain.

They are located close to the Paleo-Christian Basilica, Vega del Mar. Historians are still unsure of the baths' true origins, though most believe that they are all that remain of the Roman settlement known as Cilniana (or Silniana) destroyed by an earthquake in 365 AD.
