= Istán =

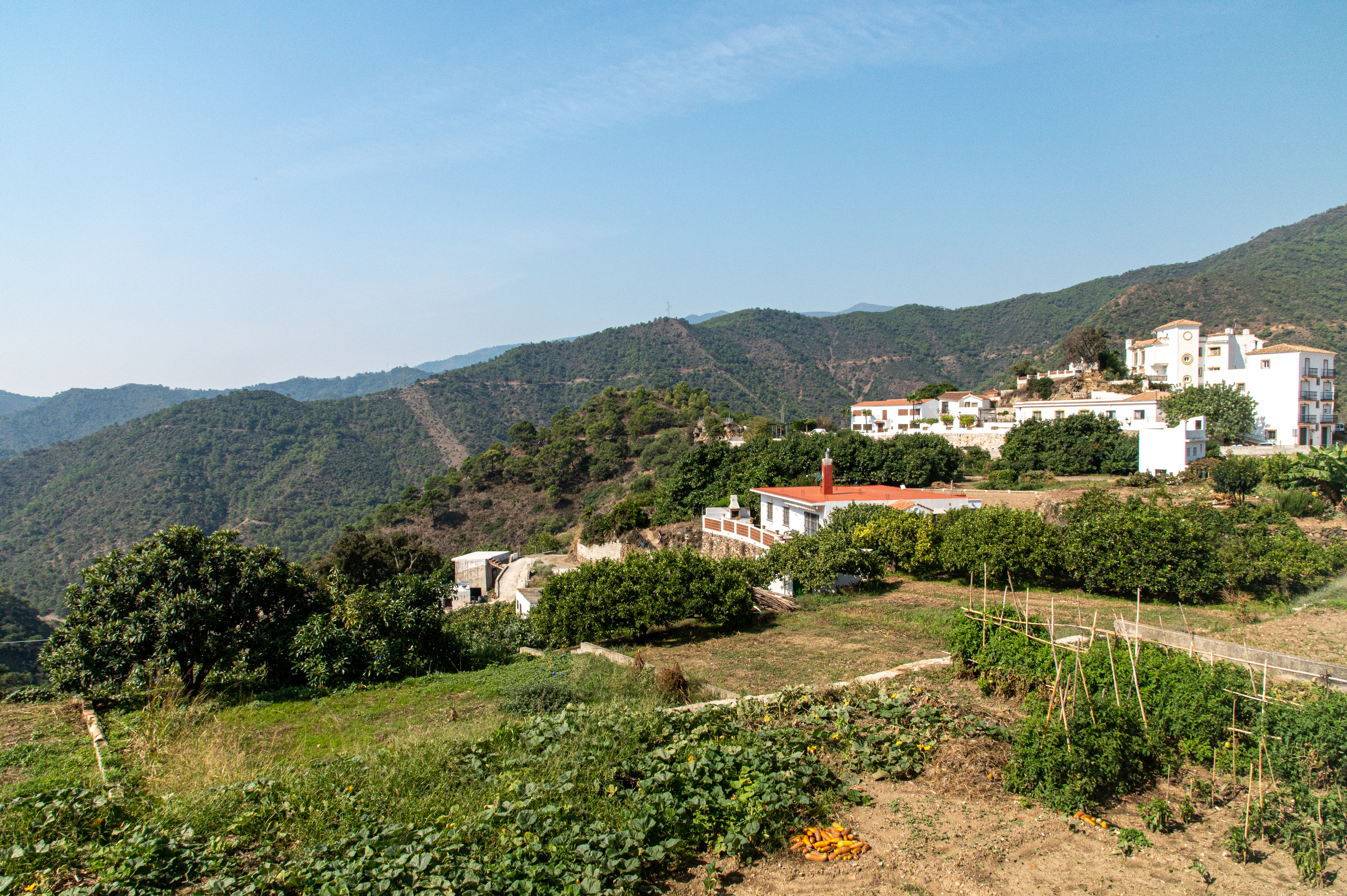
- View of Istán

- Flag Coat of arms

- Location in the Province of Málaga Location in Andalusia Location in Spain
- Coordinates: 36°35′N 4°57′W
- Country: Spain
- Autonomous community: Andalucía
- Province: Málaga

Government
  - Mayor: Diego Marín Ayllón (PSOE)

Population (2025-01-01)
  - Total: 1,707
- Demonym: Panochos
- Time zone: UTC+1 (CET)
  - Summer (DST): UTC+2 (CEST)
- Website: www.istan.es

Istán is a town and municipality in the province of Málaga in Andalusia in southern Spain with an estimated population in 2005 of 1400 people. It lies beneath the Sierra Blanca in the valley of the Rio Verde about 15 km to the northwest from Marbella and the Mediterranean coast. It is situated on the southern slope of the Sierra de las Nieves. It is also near the large reservoir created by the Presa de la Concepción dam, built in 1972 to provide drinking water to towns all along the Costa del Sol.

== History ==
It was originally a Moorish settlement and, as with its near neighbour Ojen, survived where others didn't largely because it was away from the coast. After the Reconquest, Moors were not allowed to live near the coast so as to be unable to communicate easily with their kinsmen in nearby North Africa. The moorish influence can still be seen in the town, Acequia del Chorro is a water channel called an Acequia in Spanish, built by the moors that can still be seen here, they are used in the same way as the levadas in Madeira.

== Twin towns and sister cities ==
- (Western Sahara) Tifariti, Sahrawi Arab Democratic Republic

== See also ==
- List of municipalities in Málaga

== Sources and references ==
- http://www.andalucia.org/es/destinos/provincias/malaga/municipios/istan/
