= Sierra de las Nieves =

Mountain range in Málaga Province, Andalusia, Spain

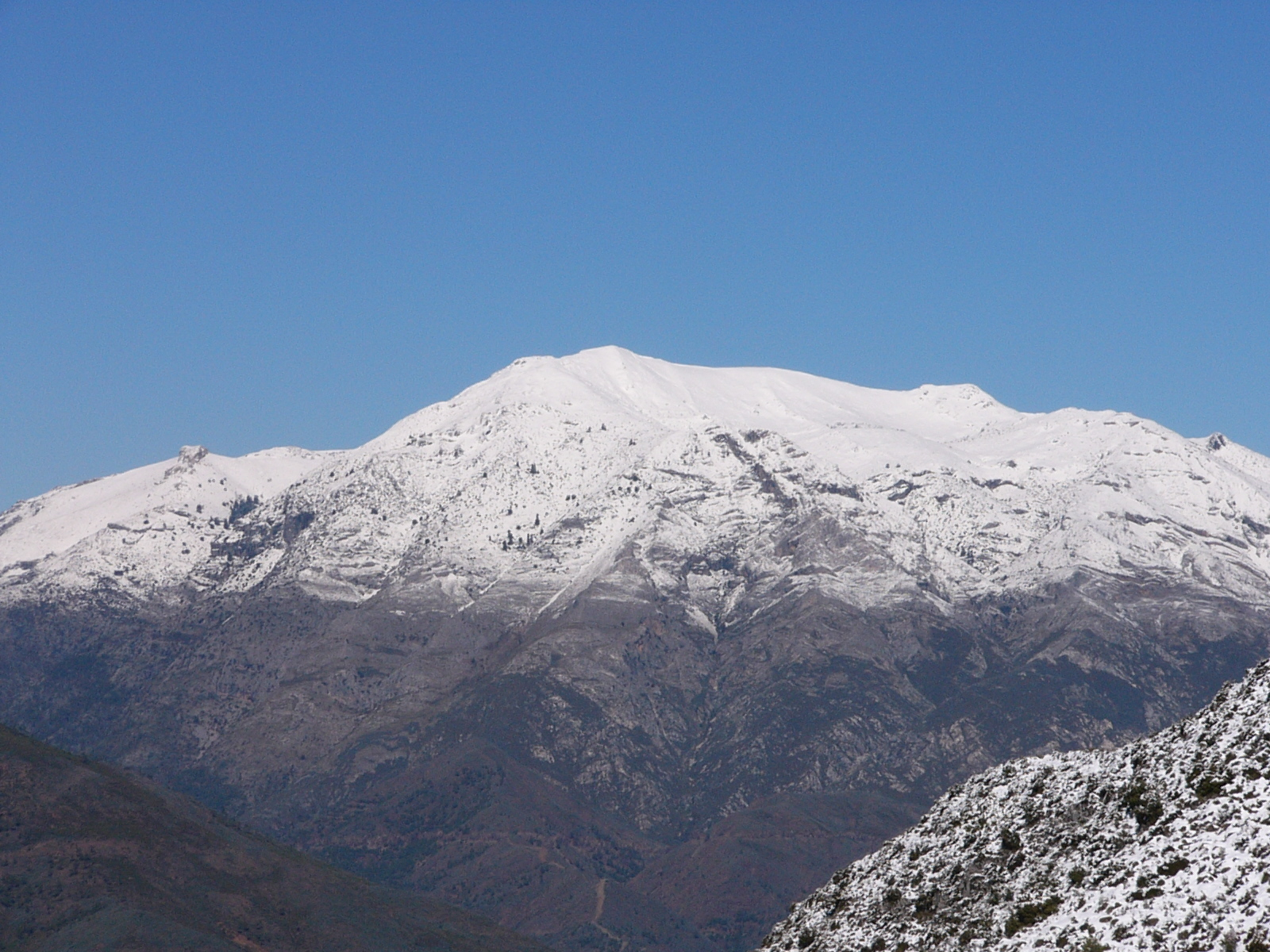
- Torrecilla Peak in the Sierra de las Nieves

Highest point
- Peak: Torrecilla
- Elevation: 1,919 m (6,296 ft)

Geography
- Location within Spain
- Location: Málaga Province, Andalusia
- Country: Spain
- Range coordinates: 36°41′0″N 05°0′0″W
- Parent range: Penibaetic System

Geology
- Orogeny: Alpine orogeny
- Rock type: Limestone

Sierra de las Nieves is a mountain range of the Penibaetic System in Málaga Province, Andalusia, Spain with its highest point being La Torrecilla (1,919 m).

Sierra de las Nieves is also the name of an administrative area, the comarca. The Sierra de las Nieves is named after the snow that sometimes covers its heights in the winter and that used to be gathered in ice pits for local use.

== Geography ==
This mountain range is part of the Serranía de Ronda ranges, located near Ronda inland from the Costa del Sol, to the east of the road to Ronda from Marbella. The easiest route to reach it is from Ronda town.

The Sierra de las Nieves is a karstic range with some impressive shafts and caves. It is composed of a few subranges such as the Sierra de la Nieve, Sierra del Pinar and Sierra de Tolox. The highest peak is La Torrecilla (1,919 m) followed by Enamorados (1,775 m).

Rivers Guadalevín, which is well known for having cut the deep Tajo de Ronda canyon, El Burgo River, Alfaguara River, flowing through Tolox, the Río Grande, a tributary of the Guadalhorce, and for the Río Verde whose dam near Istán provides water to the Costa del Sol, have their sources in this range.

== Biodiversity ==
In 1989, the Sierra de las Nieves Natural Park was established as a protected area located in the heart of the range; it became a biosphere reserve in 1995. The park possesses a huge natural wealth, with really different fauna and flora. Some plant here are endemic, like the Spanish Fir (Abies pinsapo) or the Gall Oak. the ibex or the otter maintain populations of stable individual species. There is one particular Spanish Fir, the Pinsapo de Las Escaleretas, which has been declared a natural monument. The park also has a chestnut estimated to be 800 to 1000 years old, the Castaño Santo.

== Comarca of Sierra de las Nieves ==
Sierra de las Nieves is also the name of an administrative area - the comarca - which groups together 9 of the Municipalities of Málaga Province. The municipalities which comprise this comarca are: Alozaina, Casarabonela, El Burgo, Guaro, Istán, Monda, Ojén, Tolox and Yunquera.

== See also ==
- Baetic System
