= Monda =

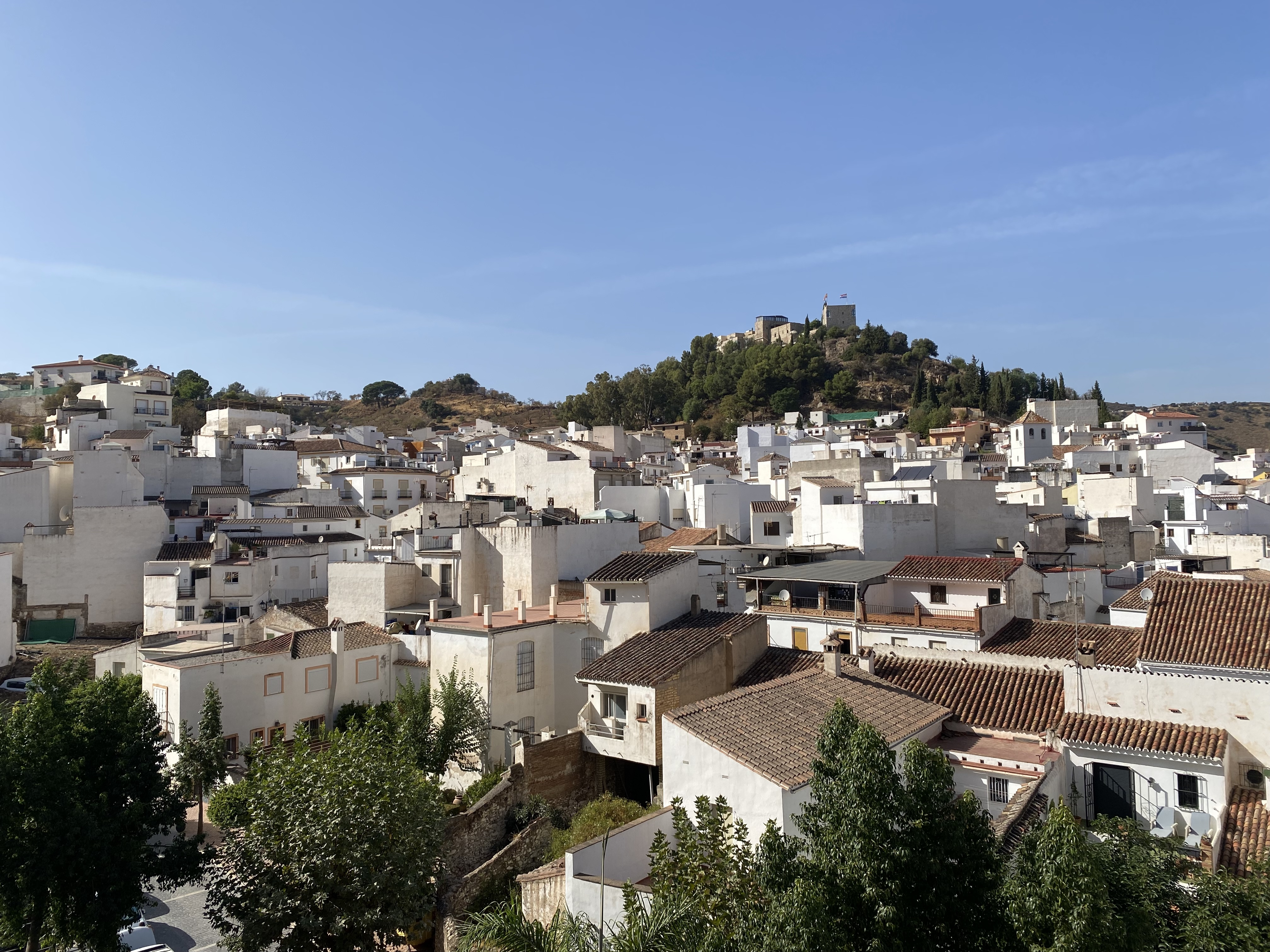

- Flag Coat of arms

- Location in Spain.
- Coordinates: 36°38′N 4°50′W
- Sovereign state: Spain
- Autonomous community: Andalusia
- Province: Málaga

Area
  - Total: 58 km^{2} (22 sq mi)
- Elevation: 427 m (1,401 ft)

Population (2025-01-01)
  - Total: 2,984
  - Density: 51/km^{2} (130/sq mi)
- Time zone: UTC+1 (CET)
  - Summer (DST): UTC+2 (CEST)
- Website: www.monda.es

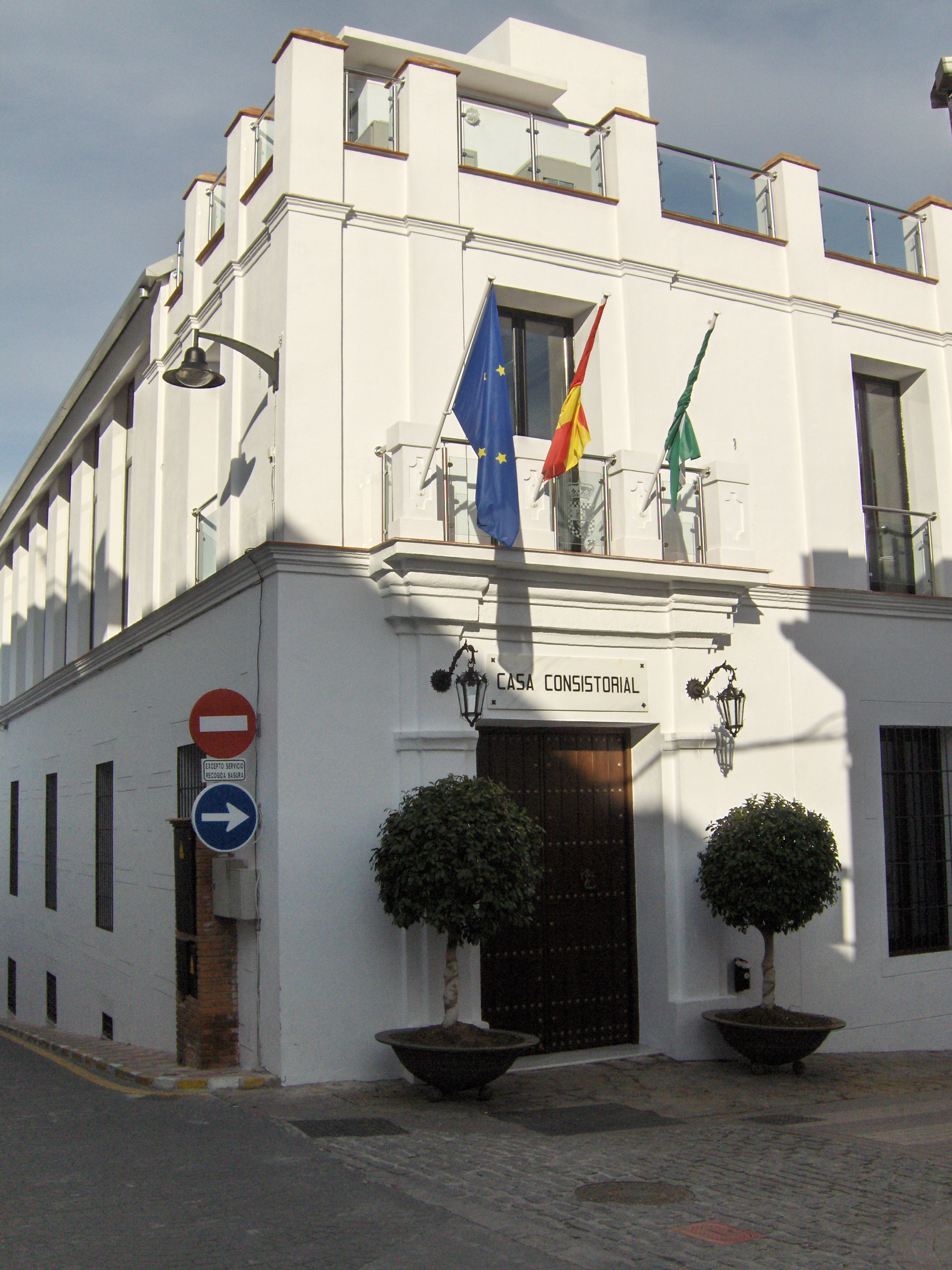
Monda town hall

Monda is a town and municipality in the province of Málaga, part of the autonomous community of Andalusia in southern Spain. It is located near Sierra Blanca and Sierra de las Nieves in the comarca of Sierra de las Nieves. The municipality is situated approximately 44 kilometres from the provincial capital of Málaga and 10 from Coín. Monda has an altitude of 427 metres. It has a population of approximately 2,000 residents. The natives are called Mondeños.

Monda also has its own Castle (Castillo de Monda) that has been built on the foundations of "Al-Mundat" an Arab fortress from the 9th century. One of the original towers is still visible, as are parts of the foundations, which can be found throughout the interior. The castle is now a hotel.

The town of Monda has a central village square called "Plaza de la Ermita". Lavadero de la Jaula is the town fountain and roofed lavadero (public laundry area), once a focus for social exchange, which dates from the 16th century. Marbella Design Academy is based in Monda.

There's a local belief that the final battle between the armies of Julius Caesar and the supporters of Pompey took place in the area. This was the Battle of Munda and while it is known that Julius Caesar did visit the Costa del Sol, it is unlikely that this battle was actually fought in Monda.

El Molino de Monda (Monda Mill) is an old mill that still makes local olive oil.

== See also ==
- List of municipalities in Málaga
