= La Mairena =

Hill top residential resort in Marbella, Spain

Coordinates: 36.53072°N 4.75359°W

La Mairena is a hill top residential resort on the Costa del Sol, just 5 km (3 mi) from the coastal ruralisation of Elviria, on the eastern outskirts of Marbella, Spain. At 400 m (1300 ft) above sea level, the village has views towards the Sierra Nevada Mountains, the Mediterranean Sea, the Rock of Gibraltar and the African coast.

The village is located within the municipalities of Ojen and Marbella, in the Andalusian province of Málaga.

In 2012, a wildfire devastated much of the countryside surrounding La Mairena, There was one reported fatality, with damage mainly to gardens. Many cork oaks, which hadn’t had their protective bark harvested before the fire, have survived and are regaining their abundant canopy of small dark leaves.

== History and development ==
The village was the brain child of the Massoud family, and was developed by their real estate company, Sarena SA. Development company Sarena SA created and trademarked the name La Mairena, which gave the name to the village, with construction beginning in the late 1980s.

Many developments of apartment complexes and villas have since been completed, with only a few still under construction. There is an approximate 50/50 mix between individual villas and apartment complexes, with many green zones and forested areas in between.

== Amenities ==
The village is home to the Hofsaess Tennis Academy, which has coached grand slam winners including Steffi Graf and Sánchez Vicario. The academy’s tennis courts (four clay, five hardcourt, and two with floodlights), gym and cafe are available for use by members of the public.

Adjacent to the tennis academy is the Kudu Bar and Restaurant, which is open all year round.

The El Soto de Marbella development in the village has a 9 hole practice golf course, gym, bar and restaurant. Non-residents of El Soto are welcome in the bar and restaurant, which hosts live entertainment throughout the year.

There are a further five golf courses near La Mairena. La Cala Golf, on the road to Mijas has three courses, and the Santa Maria and Greenlife Golf Clubs are in Elviria.

Walking, and mountain biking are popular with a number of trails from the village leading into the Sierra de la Nieves National Park and along the nearby River Ojen.

The village is home to two international private schools: the German Hoffman College (often referred to as the Deutsche Schule Málaga) and the bilingual Colegio ECOS.

== Unesco Biosphere ==
La Mairena is on the eastern edge of the Sierra de la Nieves National Park, which is a Unesco biosphere. Reserve:unesco biosphere reserve .
