= Basílica de Vega del Mar =

Spanish church

Coordinates: 36.47197°N 4.99026°W

The Basílica de Vega del Mar is a church in Marbella, southern Spain. This is one of the few examples of North African Visigothic churches built in Andalusia during sixth century. It is located near the mouth of the Guadalmina River along an old Roman road which connected Cádiz with Cartagena.
