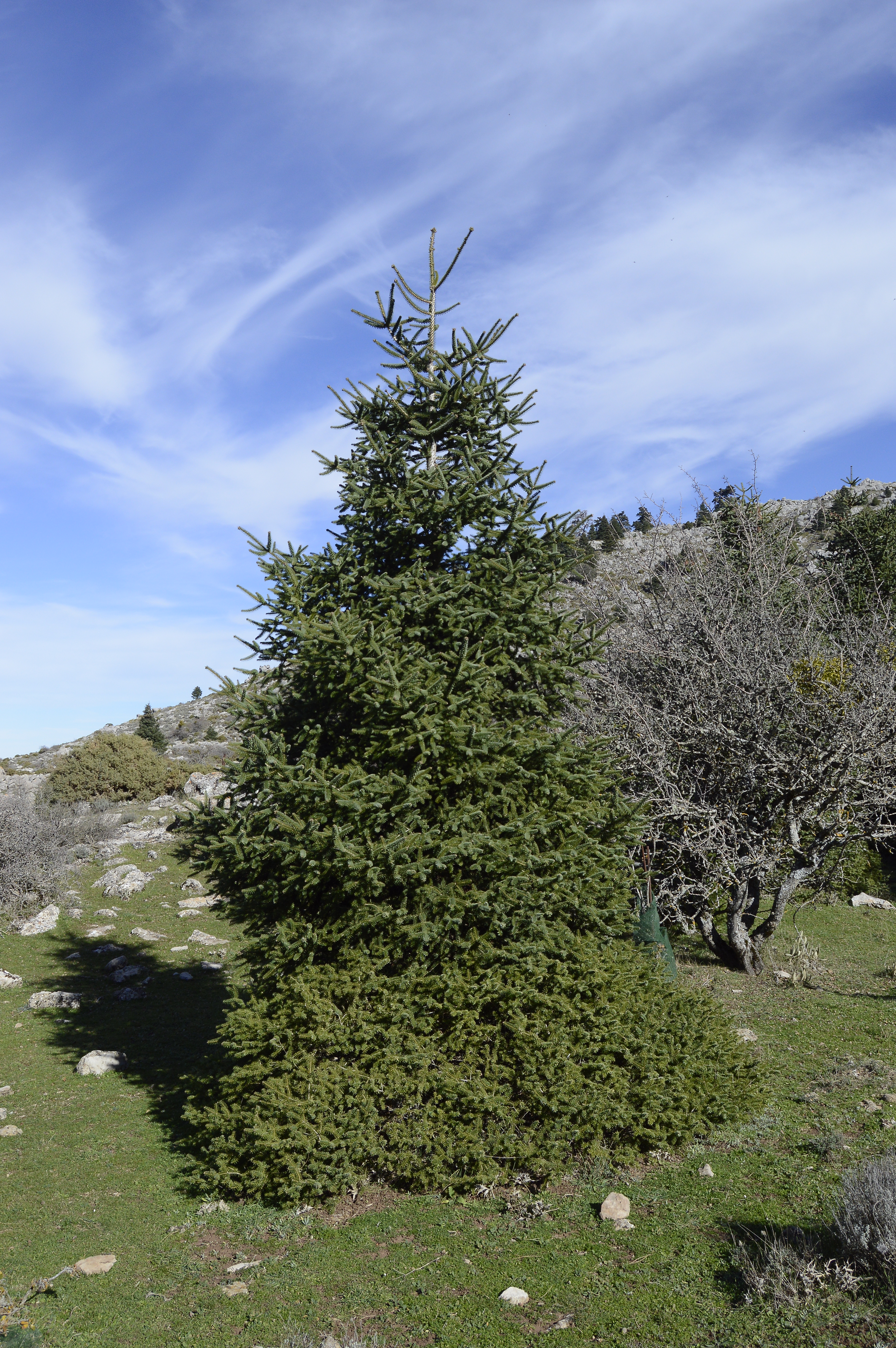
- Spanish fir in the Sierra de las Nieves, Spain

Conservation status
- Endangered (IUCN 3.1)

Scientific classification
- Kingdom: Plantae
- Clade: Embryophytes
- Clade: Tracheophytes
- Clade: Spermatophytes
- Clade: Gymnosperms
- Division: Pinophyta
- Class: Pinopsida
- Order: Pinales
- Family: Pinaceae
- Genus: Abies
- Species: A. pinsapo

Binomial name
- Abies pinsapo Boiss.
- Native range ✖ Isolated population (var. pinsapo) Native range ▲ Isolated population (var. marocana)

Synonyms
- Picea pinsapo (Boiss.) Loudon

= Abies pinsapo =

Spanish fir

Species of tree

Abies pinsapo, Spanish fir, is a species of tree in the family Pinaceae, native to southern Spain and northern Morocco. Related to other species of Mediterranean firs, it appears at elevations of 900–1,800 metres (3,000–5,900 ft) in the Sierra de Grazalema in the Province of Cádiz and the Sierra de las Nieves and Sierra Bermeja, both near Ronda in the province of Málaga. In Morocco, it is limited to the Rif Mountains at elevations of 1,400–2,100 metres (4,600–6,900 ft) on Jebel Tisouka and Jebel Tasaot. The scientific name pinsapo is from the Spanish vernacular name for the species.

== Description ==
Abies pinsapo is an evergreen conifer growing to m 20–30 m (66–98 ft) tall, with a conic crown, often becoming irregular with age. The leaves are 1.5–2 cm (0.6–0.8 in) long, arranged radially all round the shoots, and are strongly glaucous pale blue-green, with broad bands of whitish wax on both sides. The cones are cylindrical, measuring 9–18 cm (3.5–7.1 in) long. They are green to pinkish-purple before maturity, and have a smooth surface, with short bract scales that do not protrude. When mature, they disintegrate to release the winged seeds.

There are two subspecies:

- Abies pinsapo subsp. pinsapo Boiss. – southern Spain.
- Abies pinsapo subsp. marocana (Trab.) Emb. & Maire – northern Morocco.

The Moroccan subspecies, Moroccan fir, differs in the leaves being less strongly glaucous and the cones slightly longer, 11–20 cm (4.3–7.9 in) long. It is sometimes treated as a separate species, Abies marocana.

== Conservation ==
Despite the best conservation and reforestation efforts that have greatly increased the abundance of Spanish fir, it still has several threats such as fires, urban projects, erosion, excessive visitors and tourists, etc.

== Cultivation ==
The cultivars A. pinsapo 'Aurea' (to 8m, with golden new growth) and A. pinsapo 'Glauca' (to 12m plus, with grey-green leaves) have gained the Royal Horticultural Society's Award of Garden Merit.

== Gallery ==
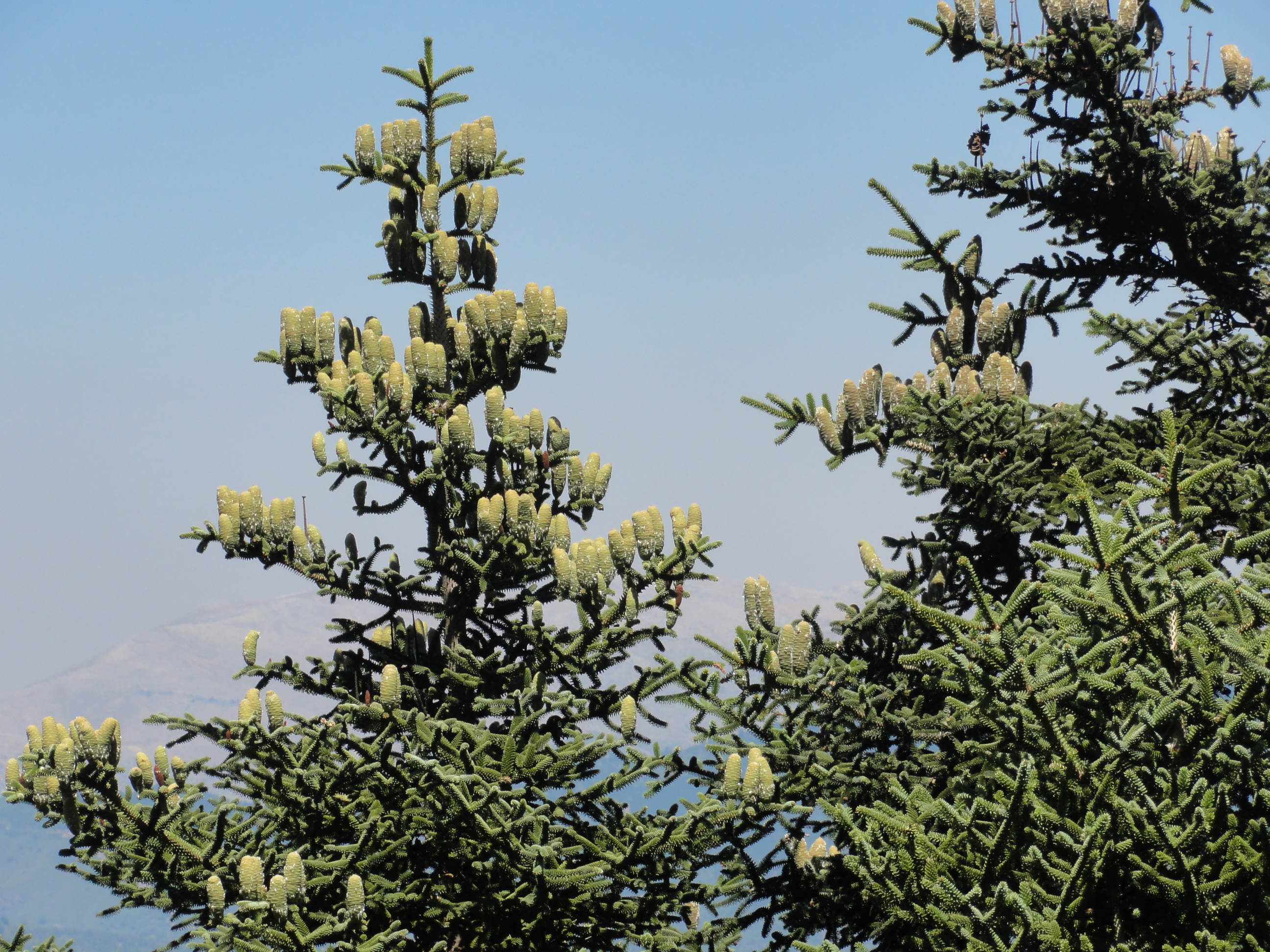
Foliage and cones in the Sierra Bermeja

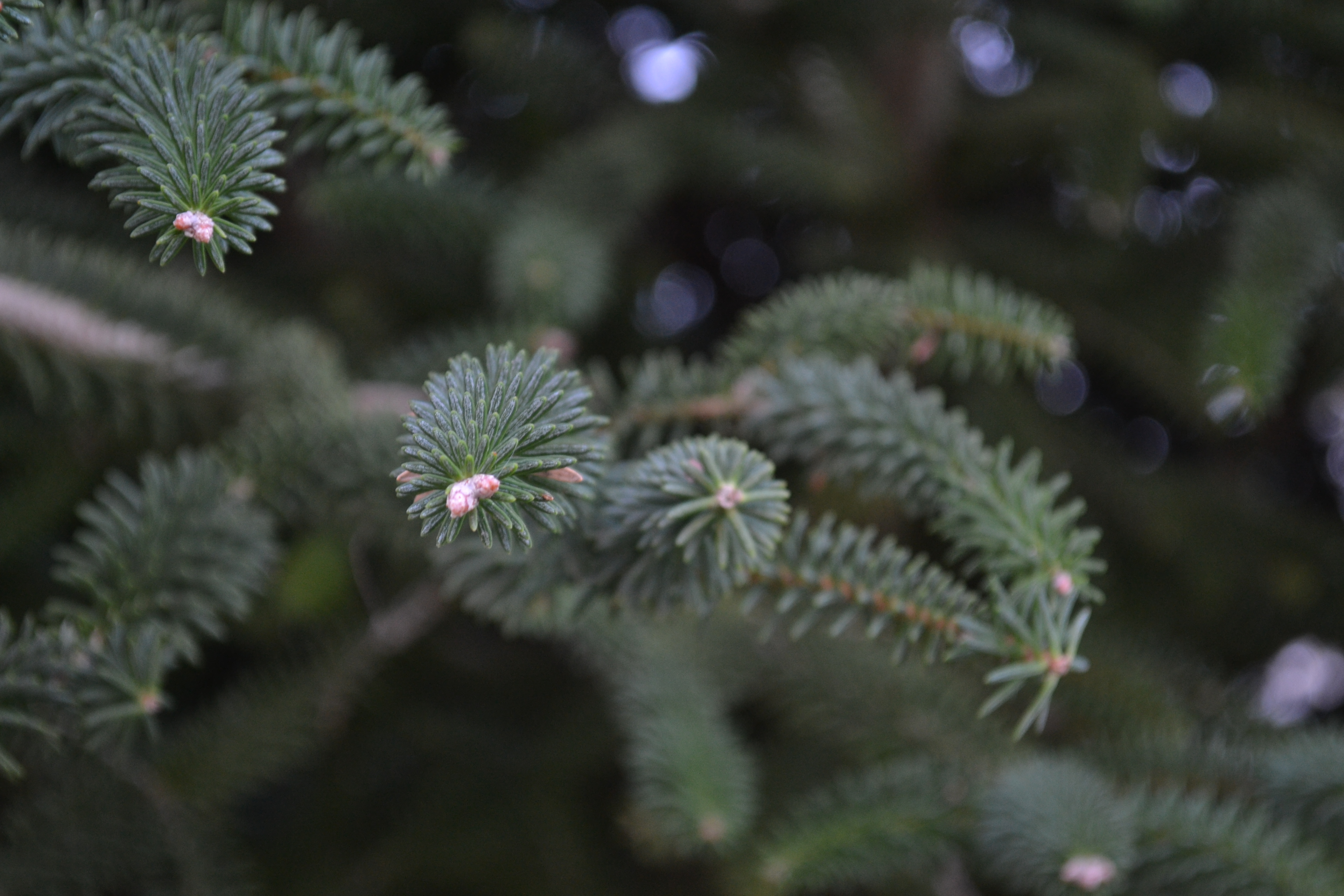
Foliage, Sierra de Grazalema

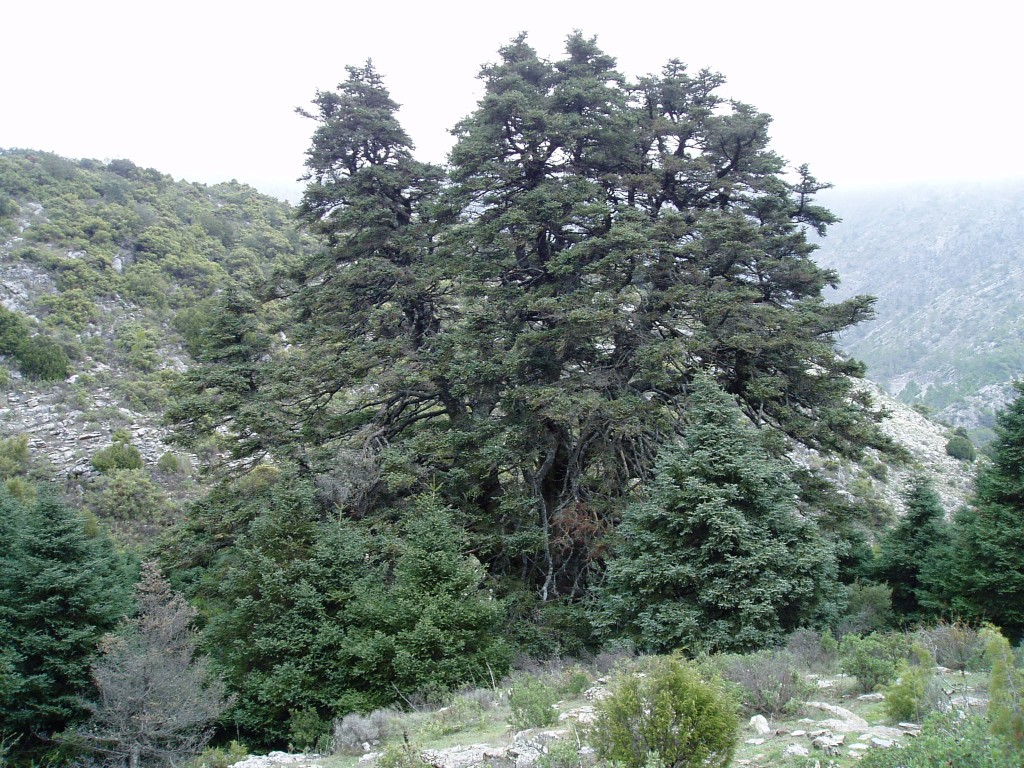
"Pinsapo de las Escaleretas", the largest known specimen, in the Sierra de las Nieves

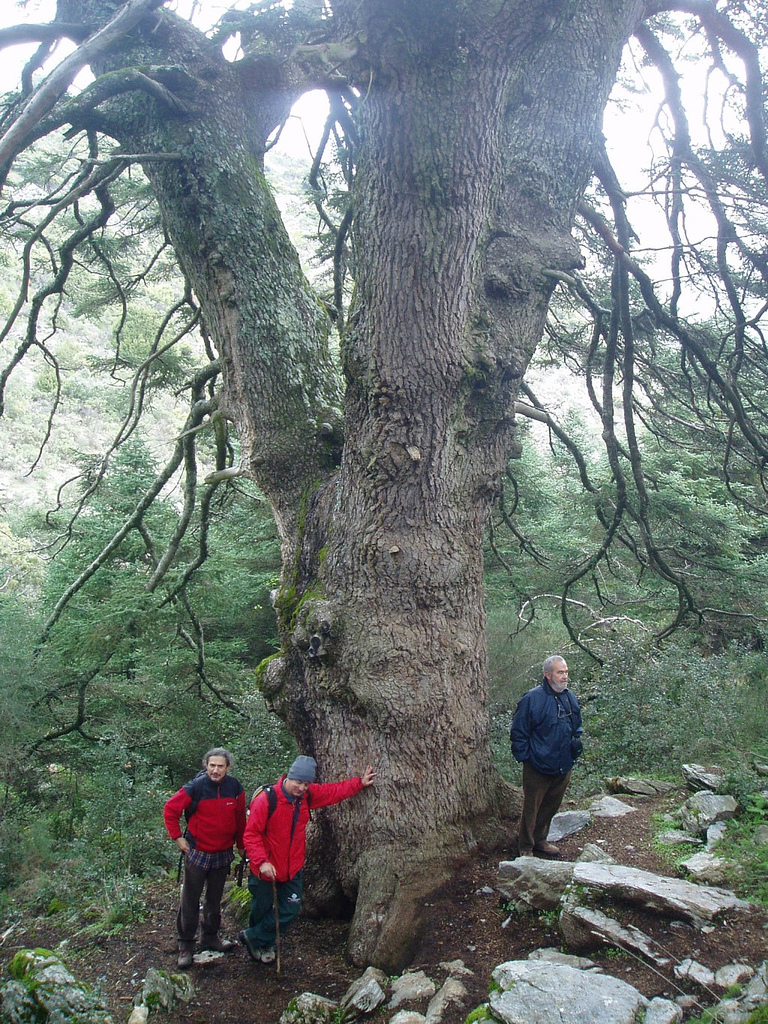
Trunk of "Pinsapo de las Escaleretas"

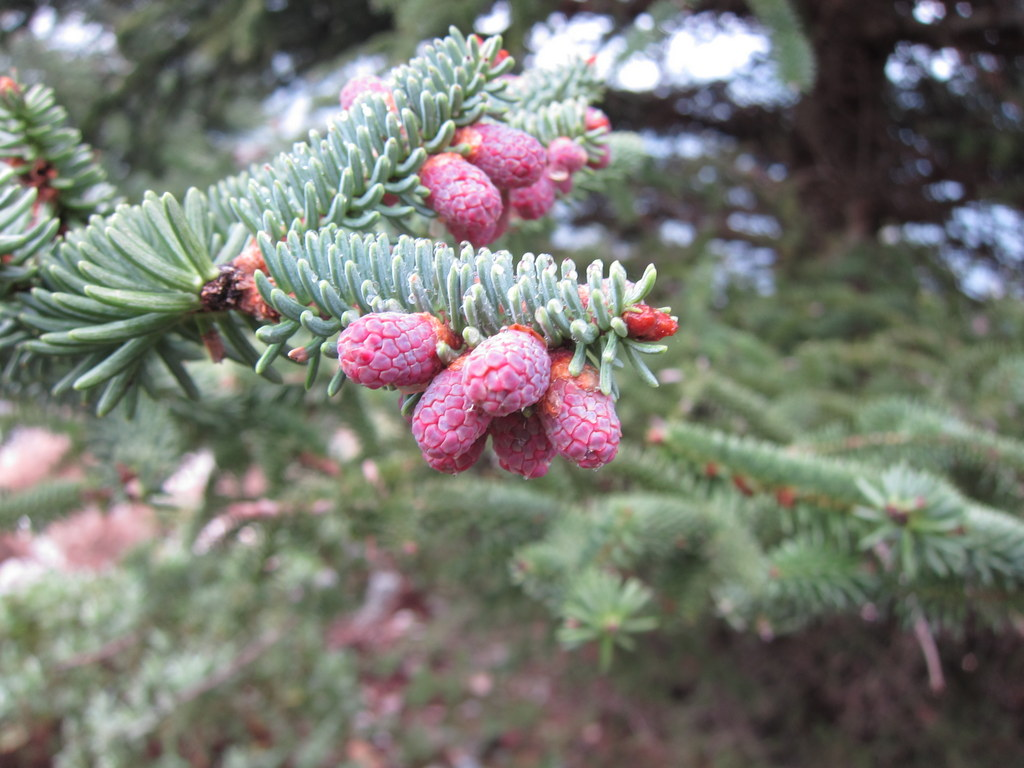
Pollen cones, in the Sierra de las Nieves

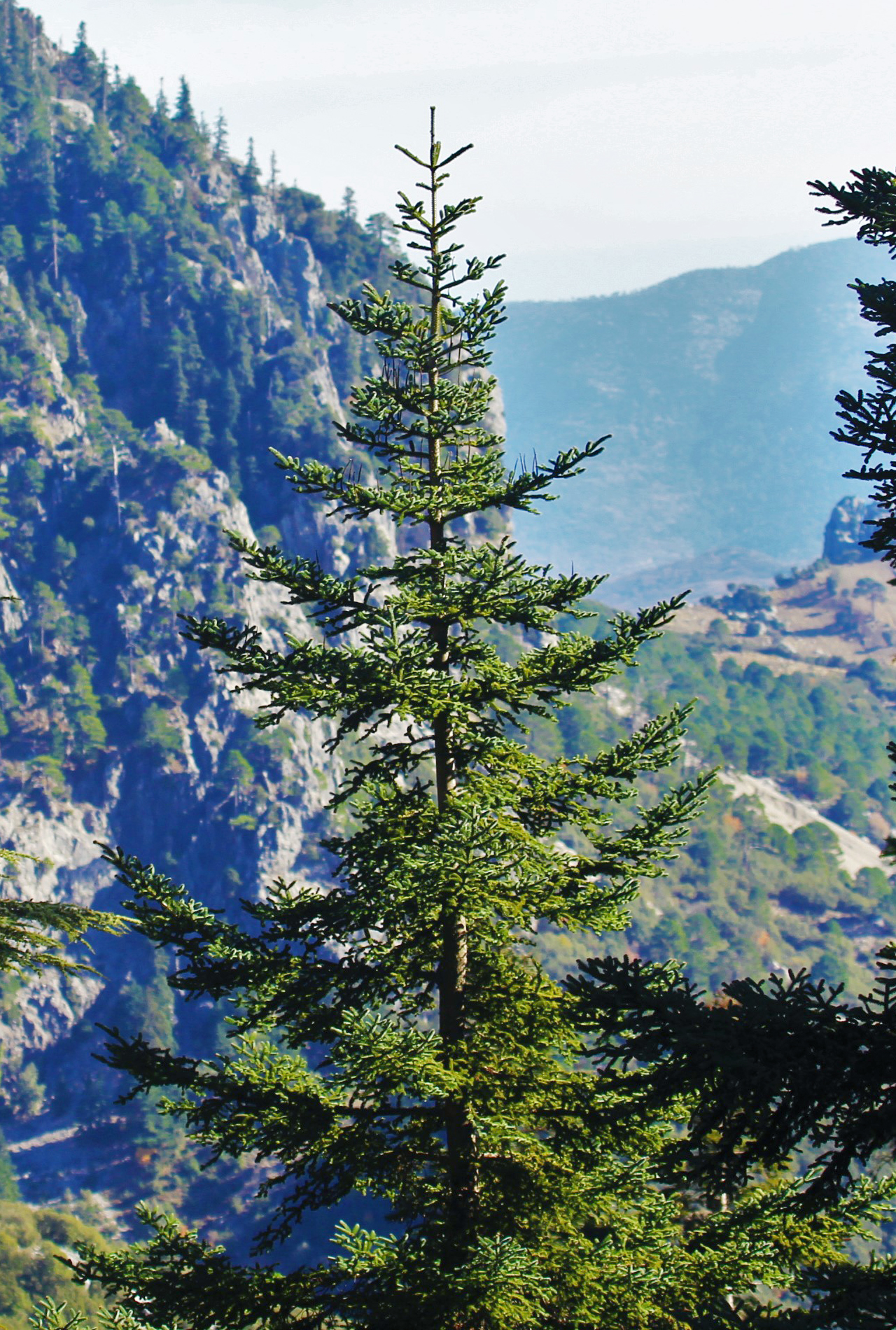
subsp. marocana, Talassemtane, Morocco

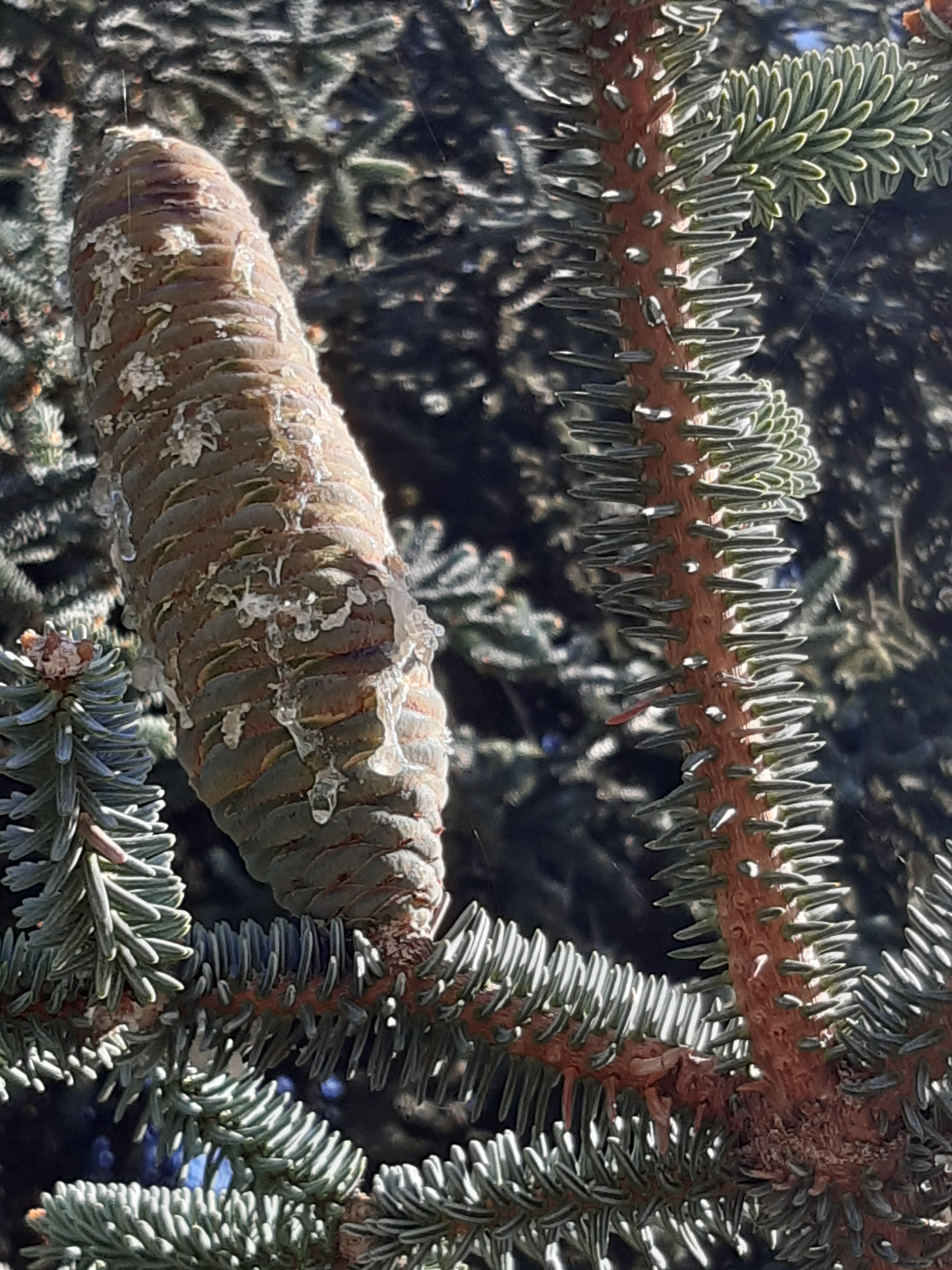
subsp. marocana cone, with resin
