= Ojén =

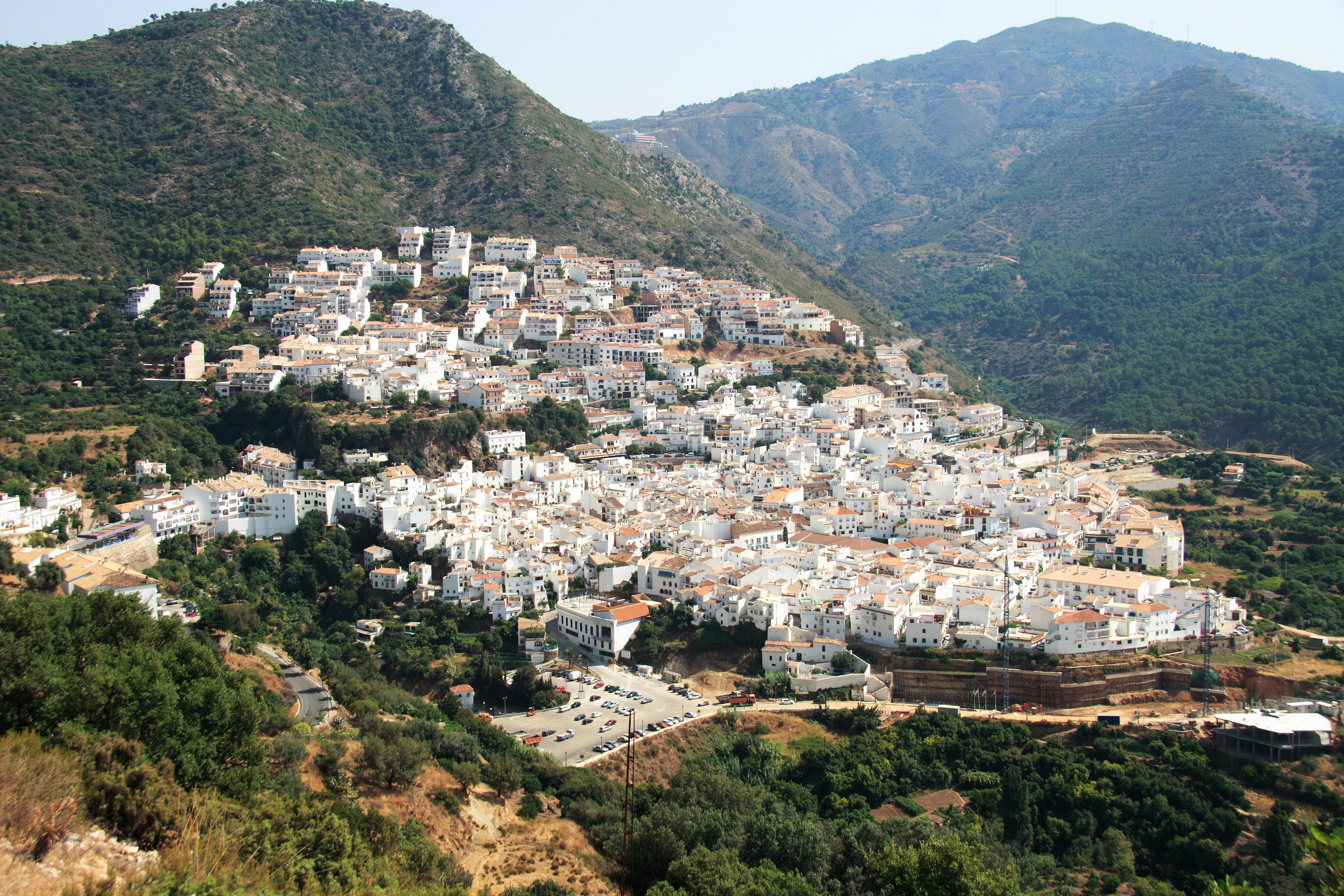

- Coat of arms

- Location in Spain.
- Coordinates: 36°34′N 4°51′W
- Sovereign state: Spain
- Autonomous community: Andalusia
- Province: Málaga

Area
  - Total: 85.92 km^{2} (33.17 sq mi)
- Elevation: 309 m (1,014 ft)

Population (2025-01-01)
  - Total: 4,755
  - Density: 55.34/km^{2} (143.3/sq mi)
- Time zone: UTC+1 (CET)
  - Summer (DST): UTC+2 (CEST)

Ojén (population 5.045) is a town and municipality that sits in the mountains behind Marbella in the autonomous community of Andalusia in southern Spain. Nearby cities include Mijas to the east, Marbella to the south, Istán to the west, and Monda and Coín to the north.

== Description ==
Its name is oddly derived from an Arabic word, hoxán, meaning "rough" or "bitter" place, thus it is curious that the Moors should establish a settlement in a place they presumably did not care for. In common with other inland villages such as Istán, Ojén was spared the Christians' embargo on the Moors living too close to the sea after the Reconquest.

The town is situated beside the Almadán stream above the valley of the River Real at an altitude of approximately 200 metres, hemmed in by the Sierra Blanca and the Sierra Alpujata. These may provide a clue to the Moors' determination to stay in spite of their apparent antipathy, for both ranges of mountains have long been known as rich sources of talc, nickel, iron and lead. This mineral wealth put the area in the forefront of the Spanish industrial revolution of the 19th century.

Close by, in the Serranía de Ronda, is the Refugio de Juanar. Originally the private hunting lodge of the wealthy Larios family, and a favoured retreat of King Alfonso XIII, this is now a hotel popular with tourists and hunters. The Serranía is still very much a hunting reserve where ibex, wildcats and eagles abound. It is also a favourite with ramblers and hikers who come for the mountain air and the panoramic views of Marbella and the coast 1000 metres below.

== Ojen liqueur ==
Ojén is famous for the production of Aguardiente de Ojén (es), or simply "ojen" ("OH-hen") as it is known in English, an anise liqueur that once played a major part in the town's economy. This liqueur, nowadays locally produced by the distillery company Dominique Mertens Impex. S.L., gained widespread fame abroad and is very popular in the city of New Orleans, Louisiana, especially during the Mardi Gras festivities.

== See also ==
- La Mairena is a green enclave, part of the village of Ojén
- List of municipalities in Málaga
