= Noldi Schreck =

Arnold "Noldi" Schreck (14 September 1921 – 1 February 2009) was a Swiss-Russian-Mexican classical architect and designer. Also an artist, painter and decorator, he became a citizen of Mexico. Schreck designed restaurants, residences, hotels, clubs, offices, shops, movie sets, ports and entire villages. His work is in Mexico, Europe, Africa, North America, and South America.

== Early years ==
Arnold "Noldi" Schreck was born in Yakutsk, Siberia, Russia in 1921. His Swiss father was one of the first naval engineers to sail up the Lena River in Siberia. His mother belonged to a large and wealthy Russian family, and her father was the owner of the shipyard. Schreck's father died when he was only three years old. Subsequently, the child and his mother traveled to Switzerland to meet Schreck's paternal grandparents. Life in Switzerland was not easy. Schreck studied in an orphanage while his mother worked as a seamstress. He played soccer on the weekends, and was an apprentice in jewelry design, then furniture and architecture.

== Career ==
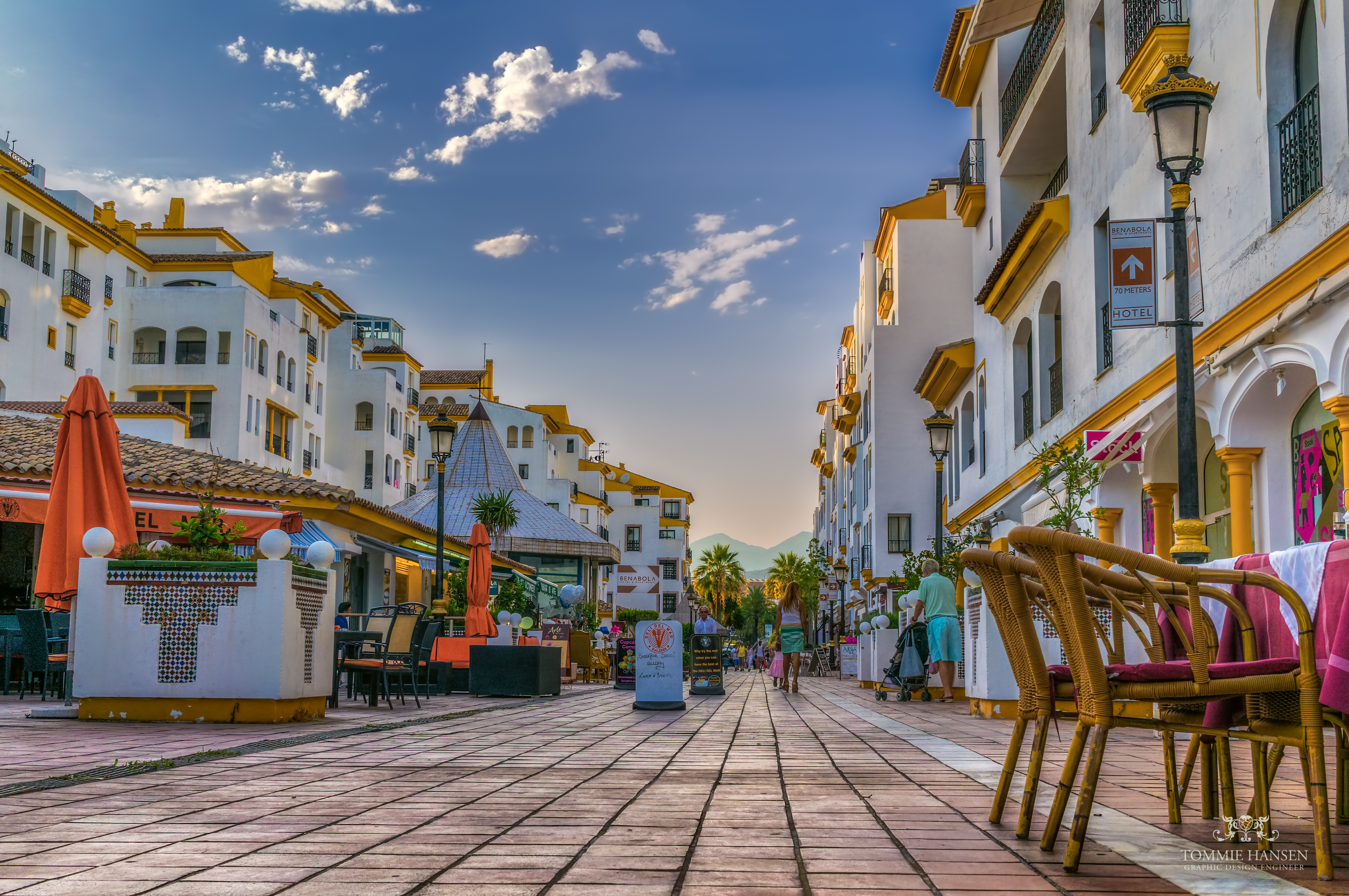
Street in Puerto Banos

After his career start in Switzerland, he worked in Italy, France and England, before coming to Beverly Hills, California, USA. Here he designed buildings before going to Mexico where he designed and constructed the Zona Rosa, earning himself the nickname, el arquitecto de la Zona Rosa ("the architect of Zona Rosa"). The architect Luis Barragán stated that Schreck was the creator of "Acapulco style, with its splendid palapas and tasteful details, crafts and fabrics of different textures, and glowing colors." His works include, the Chalet Suizo in Guatemala, as well as being set decorator for the 1965 drama, Love Has Many Faces.

In 1966, an important event occurred in Schreck's life at his Zona Rosa office when Prince Alfonso of Hohenlohe-Langenburg visited him after traveling through Cabo San Lucas and Acapulco where he stayed in two buildings which were designed by Schreck. Hohenlohe-Langenburg asked Shreck to design the Marbella Club Hotel's Beach Club on the Costa del Sol, Spain. In the same year, Schreck met Jose Banus, a close friend of Francisco Franco. Schreck went on to design Puerto Banús, which was built by Banús. It became a destination visited by people from around the world. Schreck was an Honorary Fellow of the Society of Mexican Architects.

== Personal life ==
Schreck went to live in Mexico, where he became a naturalized citizen. At a party in the Swiss Embassy, he met his future wife, Ruth Schuler, who worked at the Swiss consulate in Toronto but was vacationing in Mexico. Schreck was a great domino player. He died in 2009 in Valle de Bravo, Mexico, with his wife, daughters and granddaughters at his side. Posthumously, he was awarded a Star on the Boulevard of Fame of Puerto Banús in Marbella on 26 July 2010.
