= Abderrahim Qanir =

Moroccan entrepreneur, engineer, politician (born 1958)

- Born: 1958 (age 67–68)
- Education: Civil Engineer, PhD in Environmental Science, MBA
- Occupations: Entrepreneur, civil engineer, former Member of Parliament

Abderahim Qanir (born August 19, 1958) is a Moroccan entrepreneur, civil engineer and former member of parliament.

== Career ==
In 1979, Abderrahim Qanir was recruited by the O.N.E. (Office National de l'Electricité), as a civil engineer and project manager for the central office in Casablanca. In June 1983, he entered the office of Consulting, Engineering and Development, the CID, an international consulting firm.

In 1984, Qanir joined the Moroccan Department of Marine Studies where he was responsible for the development of the new container terminals at the port of Casablanca, in collaboration with the Port Le Havre, in France. Qanir was also responsible for the development of the National Master Plan of ports and marinas along the Moroccan coastline, in collaboration with the consulting firm HAECON in Belgium and the Cabinet Alberto Diaz Fraga, Director of Puerto Banús Marina in Marbella, Spain.

In 1986, Qanir joined the consulting team in charge of the extension of the port of Dakar in Senegal with the French office BCEOM. Then in 1988, he founded Anchor Tank Lining Morocco with U.S. partners from Massachusetts, a company specialized in naval repairs at the port of Casablanca.

In 1997, he was elected Member of Parliament from 1997 to 2002. During his term, Qanir carried out diplomatic missions to the European parliament and the American Council in Washington, D.C. where he was part of a mission at the White House, U.S. Senate and the department of State in Texas.

== Education ==
In 1975, Abderrahim Qanir obtained a Bachelor of Science in Mathematics. In 1976, he entered Hassania School of Engineering where he obtained a degree in civil engineering. Then in 1992, Qanir graduated with a PhD in Marine Engineering and Environmental Science from the University of Bordeaux, France, and in 2001, he graduated from L’école Des Ponts et Chaussées Paris with an MBA.

== Bibliography ==
- Une campagne sang et lumières
- Abderrahim Qanir MBA
- abderrahimqanir.blogspot.com
- Arabe Perostoika
- Arabe Perestrika-Abderrahim Qanir
- Marina & Port de Plaisance
- Thesis
