= Désirée zu Hohenlohe-Langenburg =

Désirée zu Hohenlohe-Langenburg, born 18 July 1980, Countess d'Ursel, also known as Désirée von Hohenlohe, is a senior member of the European Free Trade Association, in the Secretary General's cabinet. Formerly she was a children's clothes designer.

== Early life and family ==
Désirée von Hohenlohe-Langenburg is the daughter of Prince Alfonso of Hohenlohe-Langenburg and the model Heidi Balzer. On 22 September 2012 in Ronda, she married Count Thibault d'Ursel, with whom she has one daughter.

== Biography and professional career ==
Désirée von Hohenlohe founded Les Petites Abeilles in 2013, and aimed to reintroduce more traditional designs in childrenswear. In April 2014, Prince George of Cambridge wore a smocked sailboat romper from Les Petites Abeilles during a royal visit to Australia and New Zealand. This created an instant buzz that Désirée von Hohenlohe and her husband were not prepared for, as they had no sales distribution and only a Facebook page to communicate. In March 2017, Les Petites Abeilles partnered with Yoox to launch a line of childrenswear.

Désirée von Hohenlohe is also a policy officer with extensive experience in international relations and diplomacy. She began her career at the European Free Trade Association (EFTA) in Brussels, where she focused on key policy areas, including education, culture, the environment, aviation, and research. She later joined the Office of the Secretary-General at EFTA's headquarters in Geneva. In this role, she was responsible for overseeing the EFTA Council, managing the EFTA Budget Committee, and EFTA Ministerial Meetings.
