= Marbella Club Hotel =

Hotel in Marbella, Spain

- Location within Andalusia

General information
- Location: Marbella, Spain
- Coordinates: 36°30′20″N 4°55′7″W
- Opening: 1954

Other information
- Number of rooms: 121

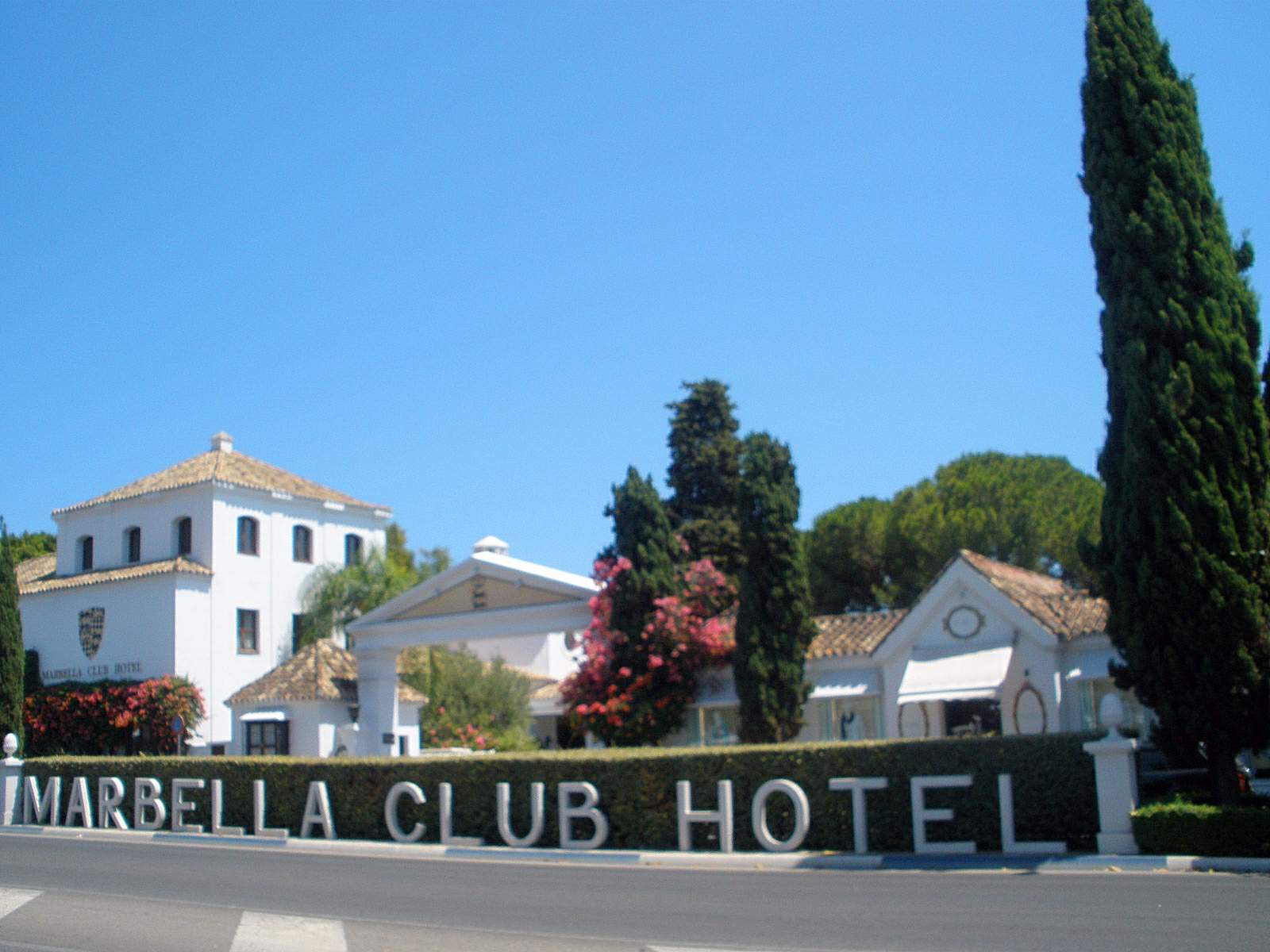
The Marbella Club Hotel

The Marbella Club Hotel is a hotel in Marbella, Spain.

The hotel is located on the southern Spanish Costa del Sol, on the "Golden Mile" near Old Town Marbella and Puerto Banús.

The Marbella Club Hotel was built in 1954 by Prince Alfonso of Hohenlohe-Langenburg as his private residence. It was extensively renovated and enlarged from the mid-1980s through 2000.

The hotel features 121 bedrooms and suites, spread over the beachfront resort, and 16 Andalusian-style villas throughout 42,000 square metres (10 acres) of gardens. The hotel has 132 rooms.

In 1999, the hotel completed its own private 18-hole golf course, designed by Dave Thomas. The hotel has a British P.G.A. Professional, Gary Vautier. A riding stable for hotel guests is also present.
