= Prince Christoph of Hohenlohe-Langenburg =

European prince and socialite (1956–2006)

Christoph Prinz zu Hohenlohe
- Born: Christoph Victorio Egon Humberto Prinz zu Hohenlohe-Langenburg; 8 November 1956; Lausanne, Switzerland
- Died: 6 August 2006 (aged 49); Bangkok, Thailand
- House: Hohenlohe-Langenburg
- Father: Alfonso Prinz zu Hohenlohe
- Mother: Princess Ira von Fürstenberg

Christoph Victorio Egon Humberto Prinz zu Hohenlohe-Langenburg (8 November 1956 – 6 August 2006) was a European socialite and member of the extended Agnelli family.

Known as Kiko, he was born at Clinique de Mont Choisi in Lausanne, Switzerland, the elder son of Prince Alfonso of Hohenlohe-Langenburg (1924–2003) and his first wife, Princess Ira zu Fürstenberg, a niece of Giovanni Agnelli, the founder of Fiat.

He died on 6 August 2006 of massive organ failure, related to complications of diabetes and a lung infection, a few days after being imprisoned in Klong Prem Central Prison in Bangkok on charges of suspicion of illegally altering a visa (a month before the 2006 Thai coup d'état). His health had been weakened from a weight-loss regimen at a Thai wellness center.

Before his death, he resided in Honolulu, Hawaii, also in Paris and Geneva, but was a citizen of Liechtenstein.

== Ancestry ==
Ancestors of Prince Christoph of Hohenlohe-Langenburg

8. Prince Gottfried of Hohenlohe-Langenburg
4. Prince Max Egon of Hohenlohe-Langenburg
9. Countess Anna von Schönborn-Buchheim
2. Prince Alfonso of Hohenlohe-Langenburg
10. Manuel de Yturbe y del Villar
5. María de la Piedad de Yturbe y von Scholtz-Hersmendorff, Marquesa de Belvís de las Navas
11. María de la Trinidad von Scholtz-Hermensdorff y Caravaca, Marquesa de Belvís de las Navas
1. Prince Christoph of Hohenlohe-Langenburg
12. Prince Carl Emil of Fürstenberg
6. Prince Tassilo of Fürstenberg
13. Countess Maria Festetics von Tolna
3. Princess Ira von Fürstenberg
14. Edoardo Agnelli
7. Clara Agnelli
15.Donna Virginia Bourbon del Monte
