= Costa del Sol =

Coastal area in Andalusia, Spain

Coordinates: 36.79°N 4.48°W

- Riviera
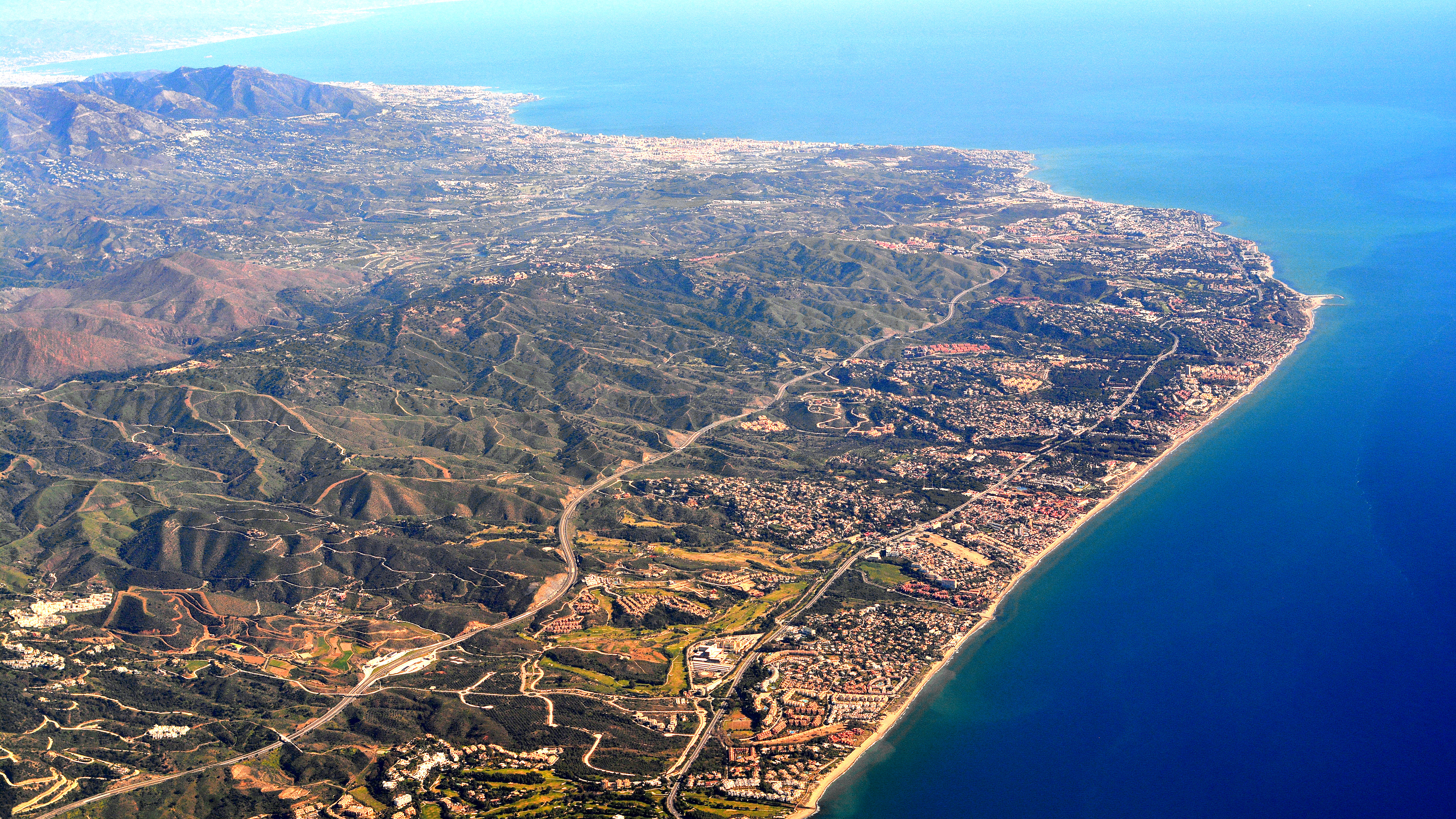
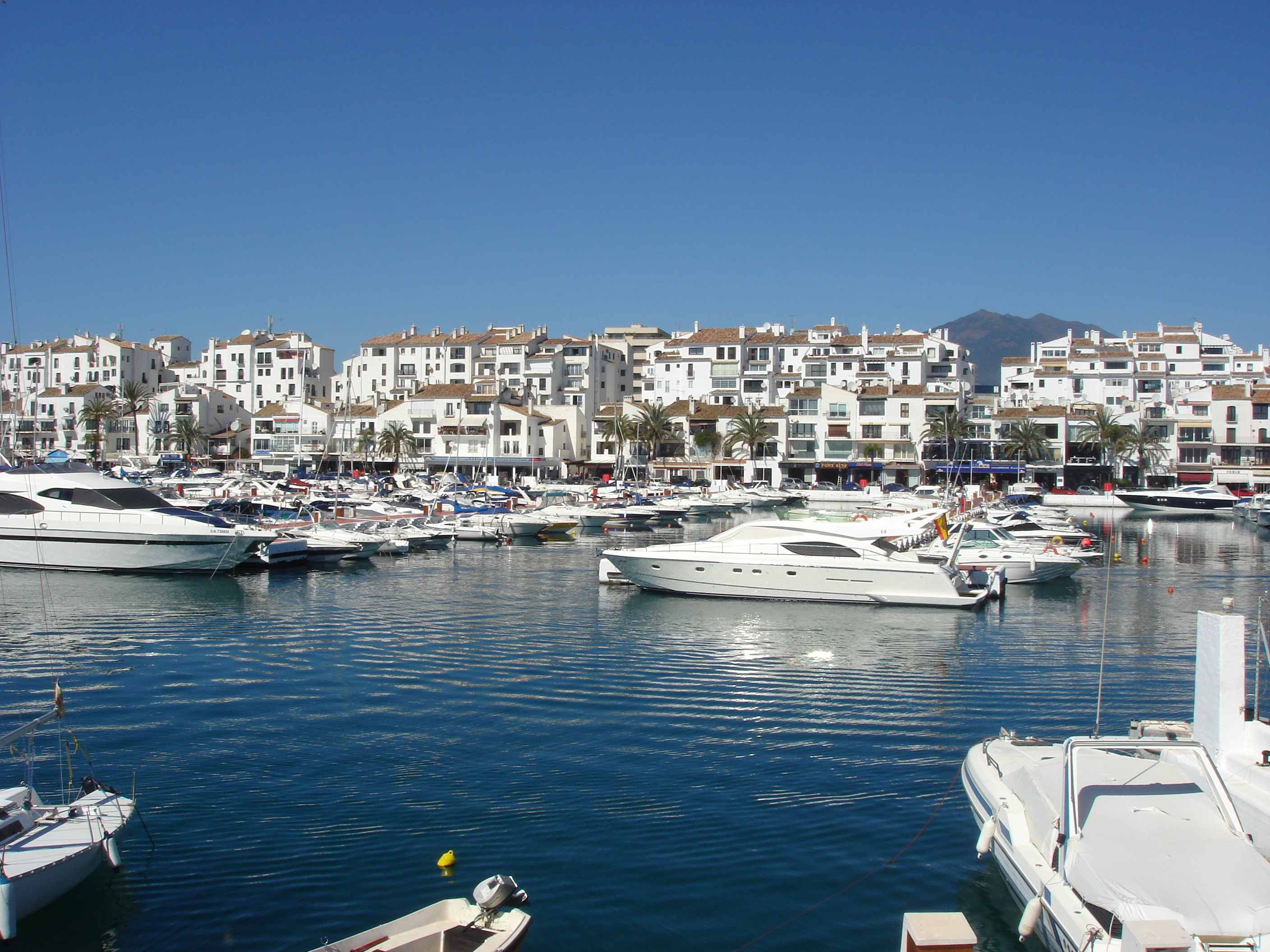
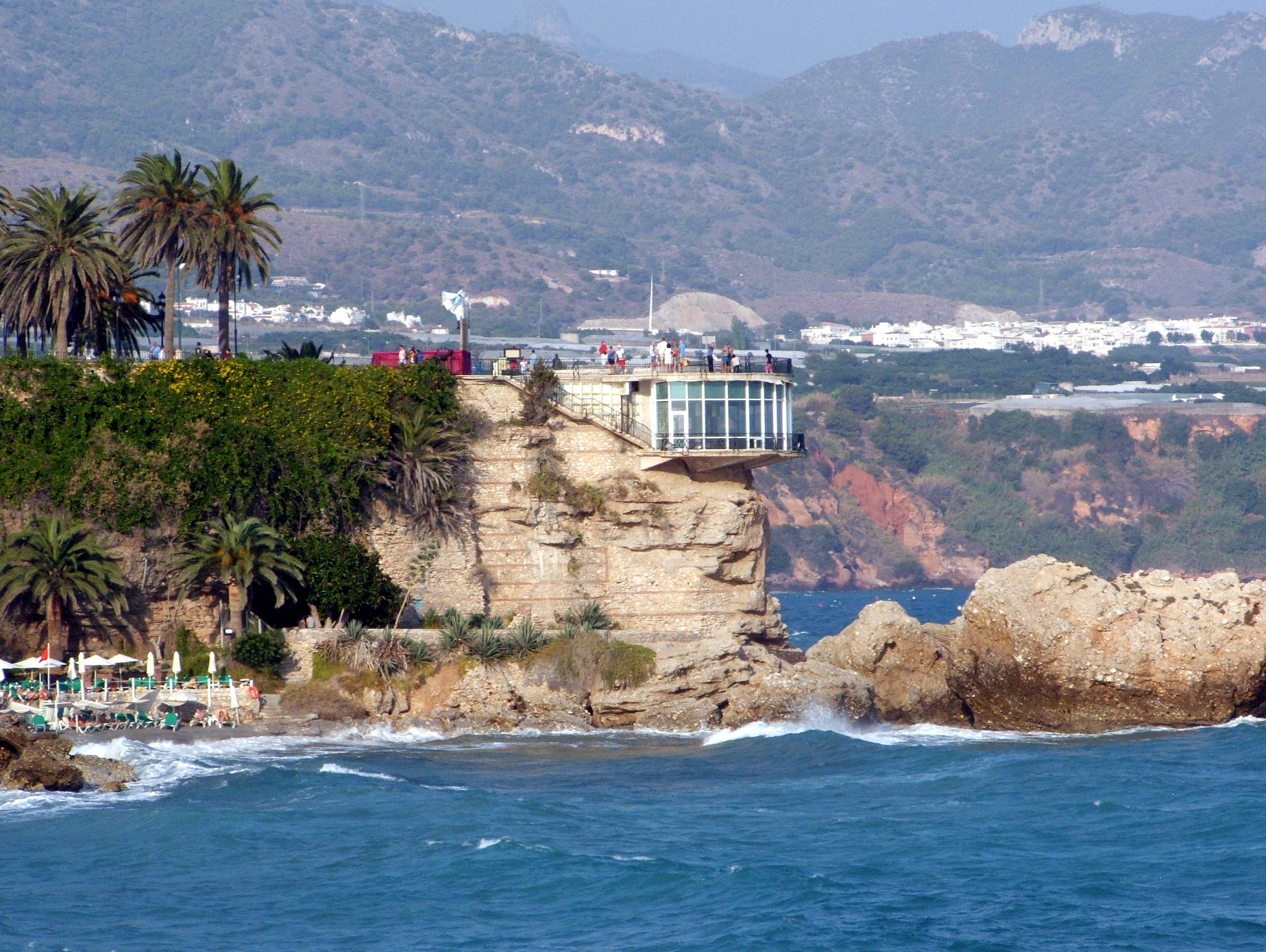
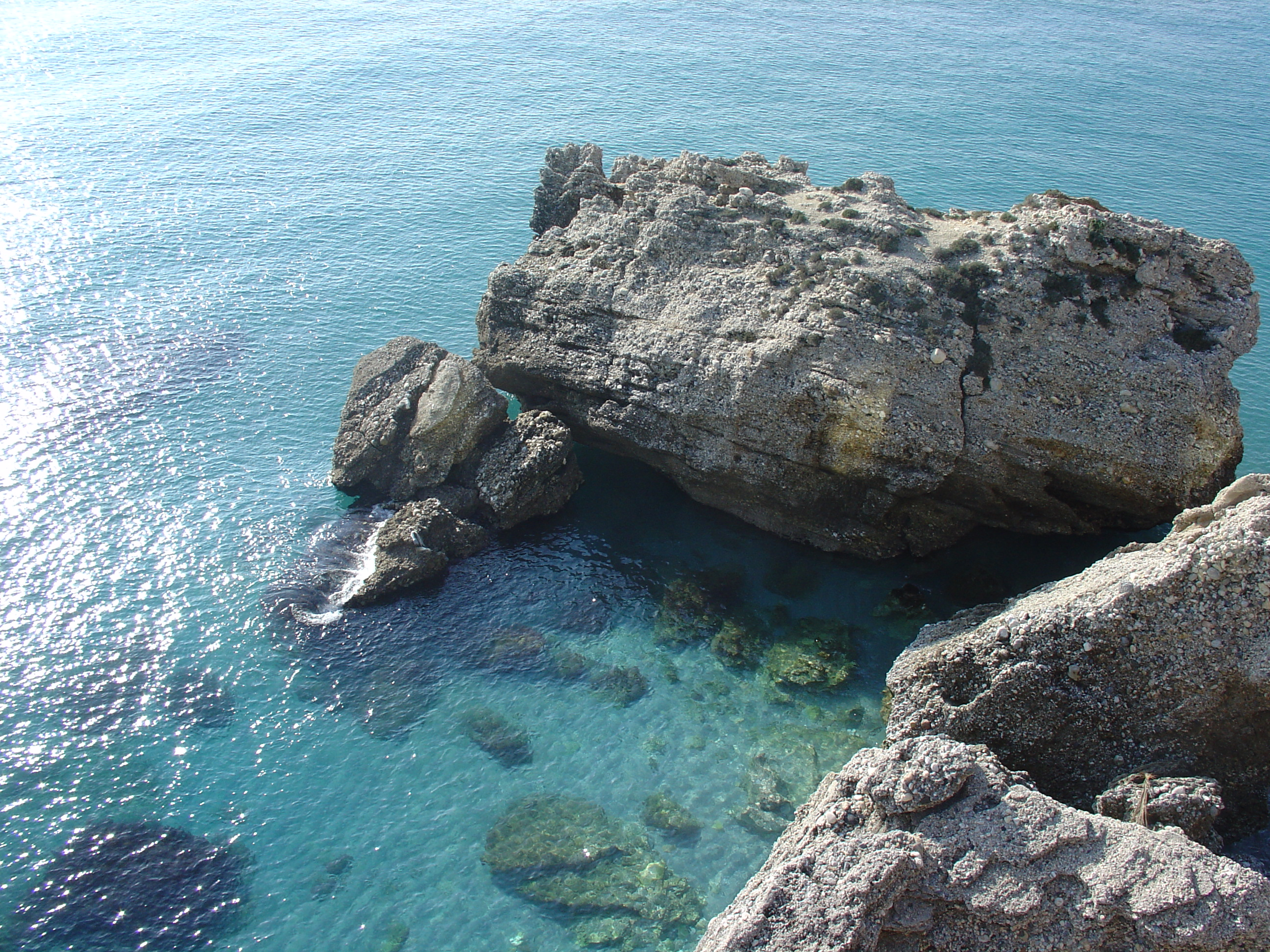
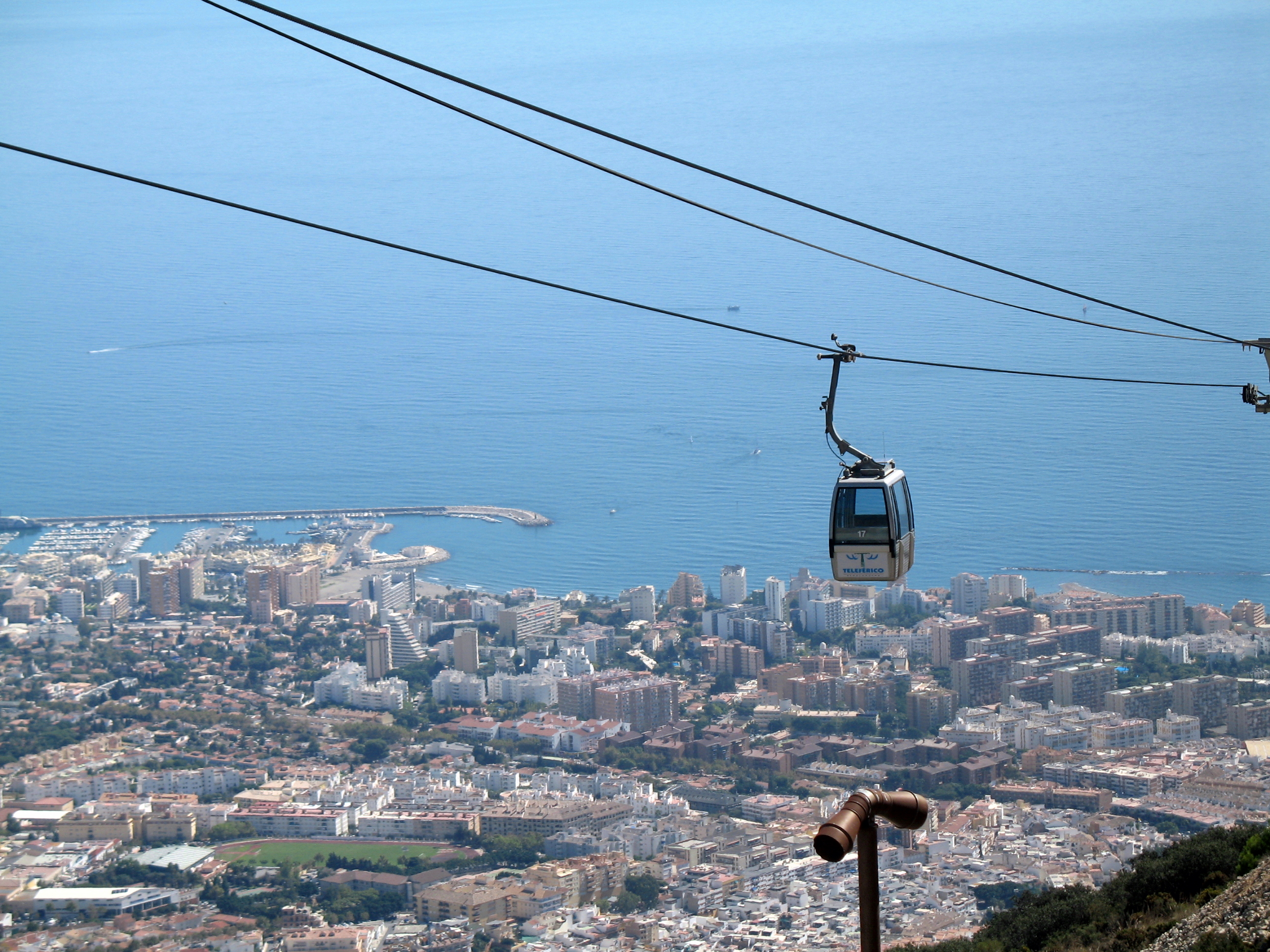
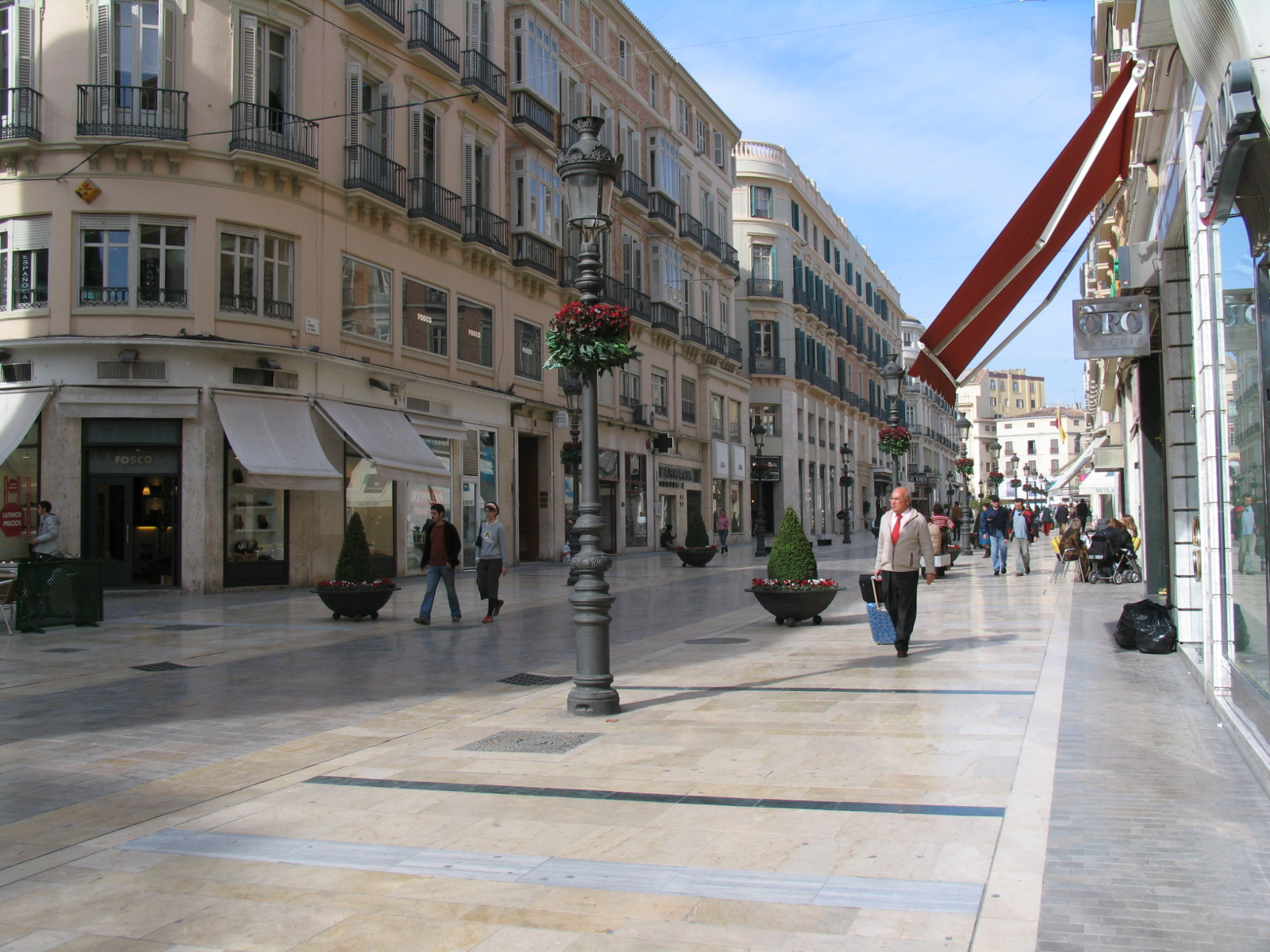
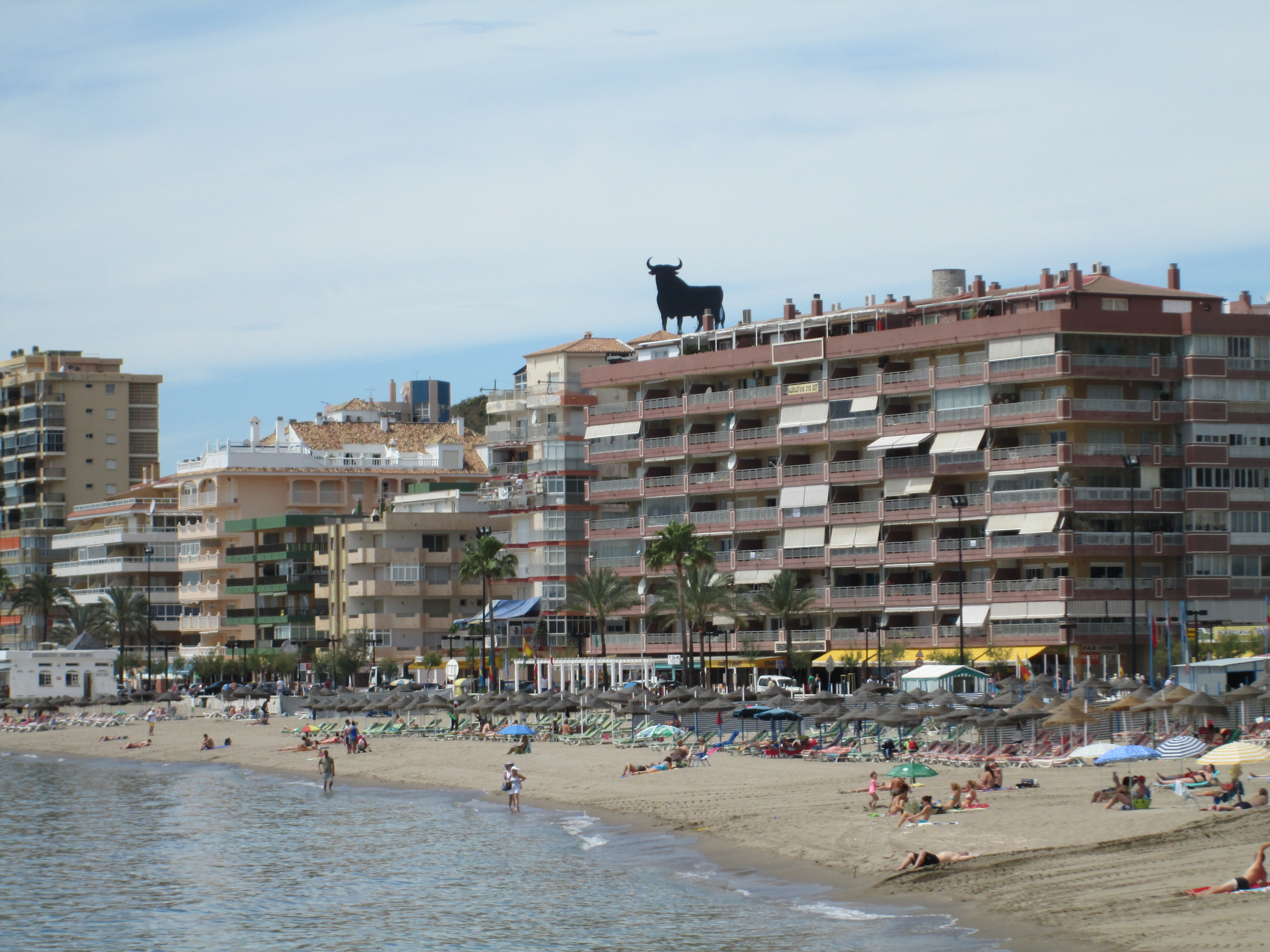
- From top down, left to right: a view of Costa del Sol, Puerto Banús in Marbella, Balcón de Europa, beach in Nerja, view of Benalmádena, Calle Larios, beach in Fuengirola

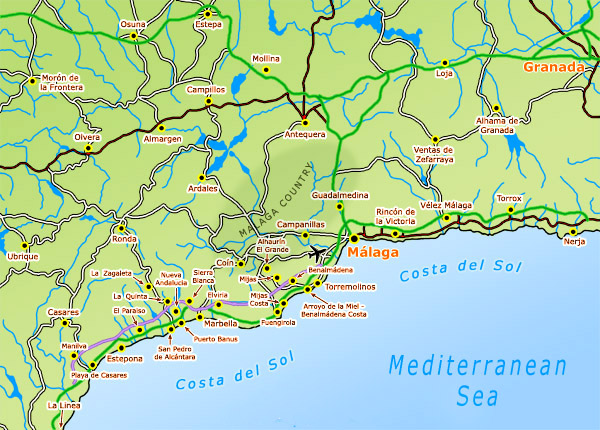
- Country: Spain
- Autonomous community: Andalusia
- Province: Málaga; Cádiz

Population
  - Total: 1,412,541

The Costa del Sol (Spanish: [ˈkosta ðel ˈsol]; literally "Coast of the Sun") is a region in the south of Spain in the autonomous community of Andalusia, comprising the coastal towns and communities along the coastline of the Province of Málaga and the eastern part of Campo de Gibraltar in Cádiz. Formerly made up only of a series of small fishing settlements, today the region is a world-renowned tourist destination. The Costa del Sol is situated between two lesser known coastal regions, the Costa de la Luz and the Costa Tropical.

The region has no official limit, but it is generally accepted that the Costa del Sol stretches from the municipality of La Línea de la Concepción in the west to Nerja in the east, spanning around 150 km (93 mi) of coastline. The term Costa del Sol was coined at the beginning of the 20th century by Rodolfo Lussnigg to promote the Almería coastline. Until the late 1960s, it was used in reference to the entire Mediterranean coast of Eastern Andalusia. The name refers to the sunny climate, present in the region most days of the year. The Costa del Sol is one of the most important tourist areas in Spain; around 35% of Andalusia's tourism is concentrated in the region; in 2009 it had 17 million overnight stays.

The region was a relatively prosperous commercial and industrial center for much of the 19th century. The tourist boom in the area began in the 1920s with the opening of the Baños del Carmen in Málaga and a golf course in Torremolinos. It became an international tourist destination in the 1950s and is today particularly popular among British, German, Scandinavian, French and Moroccan tourists. The most populated city on the Costa del Sol is the city of Málaga, with a metropolitan population of close to one million. Málaga is home to the Málaga-Costa del Sol Airport, which is the third busiest airport in mainland Spain, behind Barajas (Madrid) and El Prat (Barcelona).

The A-7 highway runs through the region, as does the old national highway generally known as N-340. High-speed trains serve the coastal region and inland areas, the AVE service reaches the Málaga-María Zambrano railway station in 2 hours 46 minutes from Madrid. The Costa del Sol has a population of 1,412,541 inhabitants. The Costa del Sol has spas in Málaga, Tolox, Estepona, Benahavís, Benalmádena, Mijas, Torremolinos and Marbella, the largest concentration of golf courses on the European continent, fifteen marinas, nine theme parks (including amusement parks, aquariums and zoos), as well as an information and communication technology business park (PTA), a Google cybersecurity center and a Vodafone research and development center.

== Geography ==
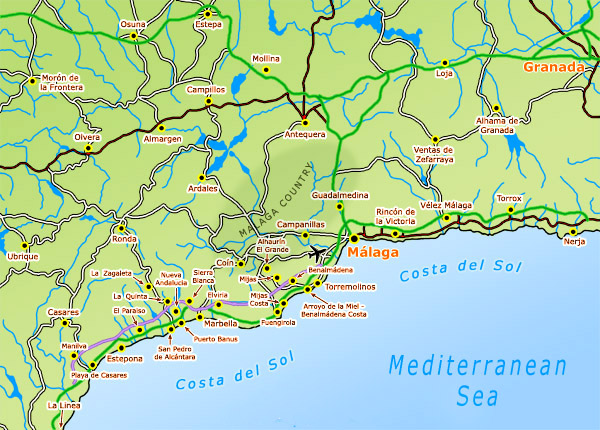
Map of Costa del Sol – cities, towns, resorts, villages

The Costa del Sol includes the city of Málaga and also the towns of Torremolinos, Benalmádena, Fuengirola, Mijas, Marbella, San Pedro de Alcántara, Estepona, Manilva, Casares, Rincón de la Victoria, Vélez-Málaga, Nerja, Frigiliana and Torrox.

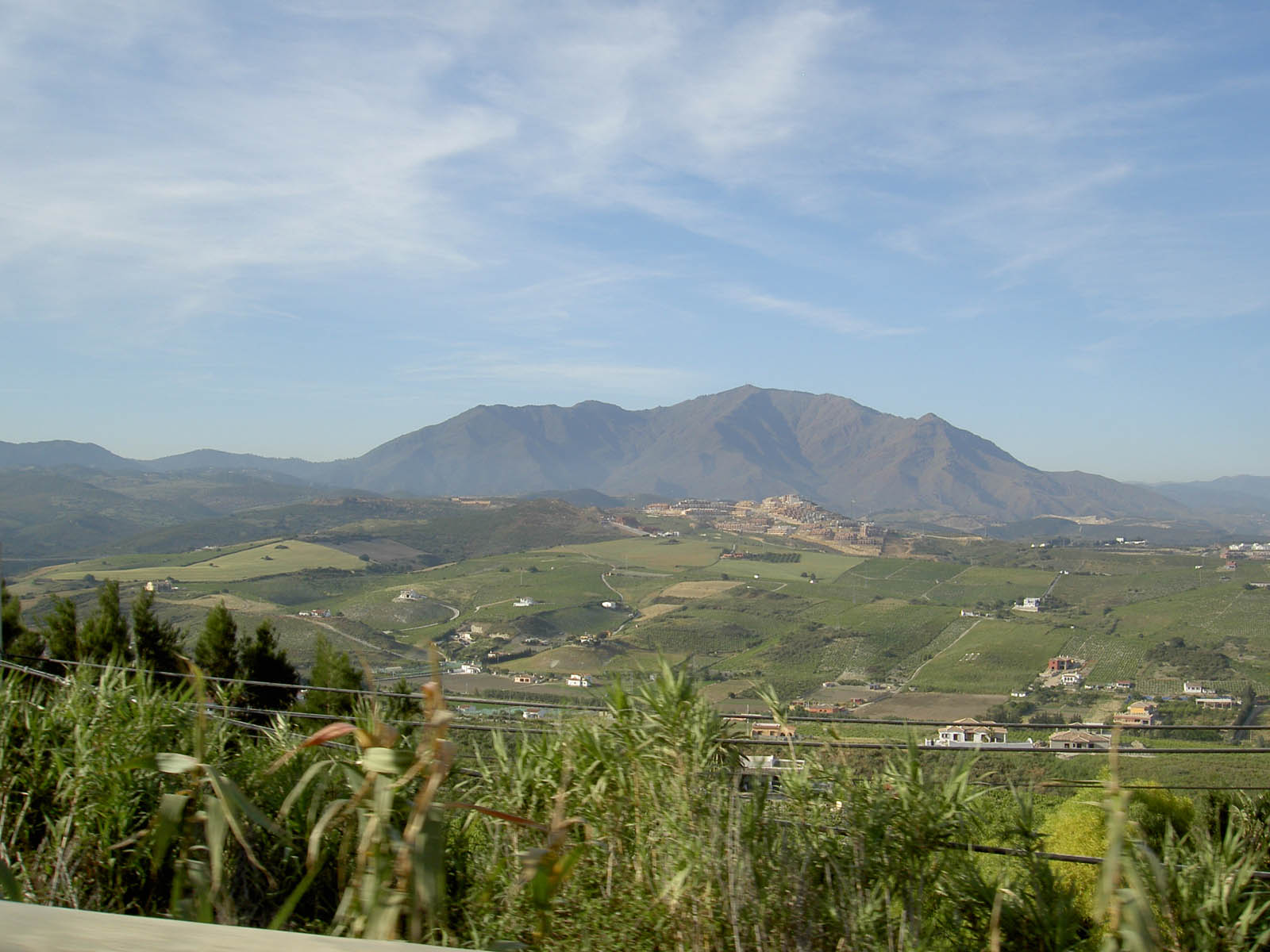
Sierra Bermeja

This shoreline region extends from the cliffs at Maro in the East to Punta Chullera in the west. It occupies a narrow coastal strip delimited by some ranges of the Penibaetic System, including the Sierra de Mijas, Sierra Alpujata, Sierra Blanca, Sierra Bermeja, Sierra Crestellina and Montes de Málaga to the north and the Mediterranean Sea to the south. The coast shows a diversity of landscapes: beaches, cliffs, estuaries, bays and dunes. The rivers are short and seasonal, while the agriculture is hampered by the lee effect caused by the Baetic System.

== History ==
=== Prehistory ===
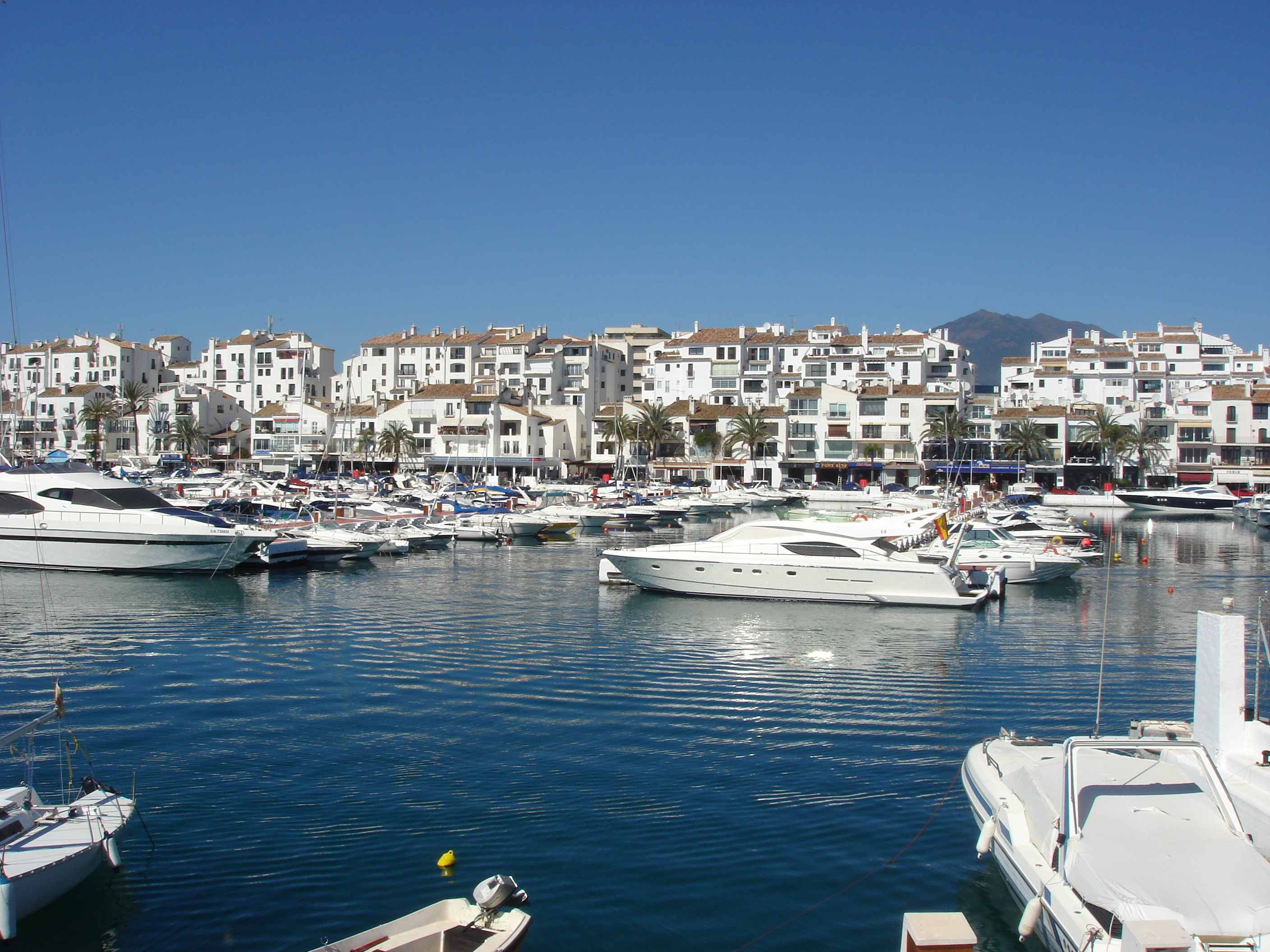
Puerto Banús, Marbella

The settlement history of this coast spans about 2,800 years. The first inhabitants to settle here may have been the Bastuli, an ancient Celtiberian tribe. The Phoenicians founded their colony of Malaka here about 770 BC, and from the 6th century BC it was under the hegemony of ancient Carthage in north Africa. From 218 BC the region was ruled by the Roman Republic and then at the end of the 1st century it was federated with the Roman Empire.

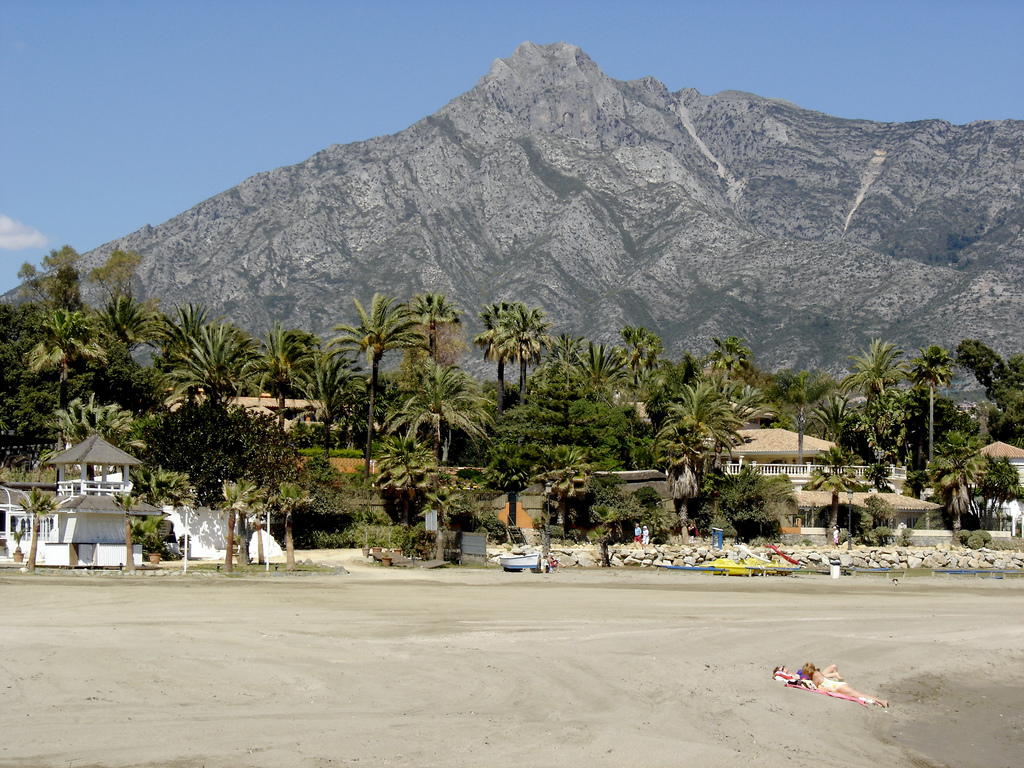
A beach on the Costa del Sol, with the Sierra Blanca in the background

Under the rule of the Roman Republic, the Municipium Malacitanum became a transit point on the Via Herculea, which revitalised the city both economically and culturally by connecting it with other developed enclaves in the interior of Hispania and with other ports of the Mediterranean Sea.

The decline of the Roman imperial power in the 5th century led to invasions of Hispania Baetica by Germanic peoples and by the Byzantine Empire. The southern Mediterranean coast was part of Visigothic Spain from the fifth century until the Muslim Arab conquest of Hispania (711–718) The city, then known as Mālaqa (مالقة), was encircled by defensive walls and became part of the Muslim Empire. In 1026 it became the capital of the Taifa of Málaga, an independent Muslim kingdom ruled by the Hammudid dynasty in the Caliphate of Córdoba, which was conquered by the Nasrid Kingdom of Granada.

The siege of Mālaqa by the Catholic Monarchs in 1487 was one of the longest of the Reconquista. In the 16th century, the area entered a period of slow decline, exacerbated by epidemics of disease, several successive poor food crops, floods, and earthquakes.

Trade, dominated by foreign merchants, was the main source of wealth in Málaga province of the 18th century, with wine and raisins as the principal commodity exports. Public works done on the Málaga city port as well as those on the Antequera and Velez roadways provided the necessary infrastructure for distribution of the renowned Málaga wines.

Málaga, as headquarters of the Capitanía General de Granada (Captaincy General of the Kingdom of Granada) on the coast, played an essential role in the foreign policy of the Bourbon kings of Spain. The regional military and the defence of the Mediterranean were administered in the city. The loss of Gibraltar to the British in the Battle of Málaga of 1704 made the city the key to military defence of the Strait.

During the second half of the 18th century Málaga solved its chronic water supply problems with the completion of one of the largest infrastructure projects carried out in Spain at the time: the building of the Aqueduct of San Telmo. The peasantry and the working classes still made up the vast majority of the population, but the emergence of a business-oriented middle-class lay the foundations for the 19th-century economic boom.

=== Beginnings of the tourist industry ===
Having been a relatively prosperous commercial and industrial centre for most of the 19th century, Málaga province experienced a severe economic contraction in the 1880s and 1890s. It led to the end of the iron industry in 1893, and weakened the trade and textile industry. The agricultural sector suffered a deep depression that affected the raising of livestock and all the major crops, especially cultivation of Vitis vinifera, a grape used for the wine industry, which was devastated by a Phylloxera epidemic.

The social disruption caused by the crisis and its aftermath of job loss, business collapse and general decline in economic activity, led many residents to consider other means of livelihood. Even at this early date some of them envisaged tourism as an alternative source of income, but years passed before initiatives were put forward to develop Málaga as a tourist resort. The Sociedad Propagandística del Clima y Embellecimiento de Málaga (Propagation Society for the Climate and Beautification of Málaga) was founded in 1897 by a pioneering group of influential Málaga businessmen who saw the potential of tourism as a generator of wealth, and tried to organise a rational planned development of this sector of the economy. Their promotional campaigns extolled the mild climate of Málaga, attracting enough tourists and winter visitors to help relieve the economic slump somewhat.

At the beginning of the 20th century, the Baños del Carmen beach was developed and opened in the east of Málaga. The Torremolinos golf course followed in 1928. According to local historian Fernando Alcala, on 15 October 1933, the "Hotel Miramar" was inaugurated in Marbella. The owners, Jose Laguno Canas and Maria Zuzuarregui (daughter of Agustina Zuzuarregui y Sutton Clonard) promoted this hotel and the city of Marbella in English and in French, using the expressions "Sunny Coast" and "Côte du Soleil "in all its stationery and lampoons. According to Estefania Rodriguez Camacho, quoting Fernando Alcala's book, ["Marbella. Years of Tourism. Volume I. The beginning of a long march."] these are the real inventors of the expression "Costa del Sol".

However, development of the tourist sector was interrupted by the Spanish Civil War and World War II.

=== Spanish Civil War ===
Following the uprising of Francoist forces in July 1936, control of Andalusia was divided between the Republican forces and the Nationalists, with the Costa del Sol remaining in the Republican zone and Málaga serving as a naval base for the Spanish Republican Navy. The Battle of Málaga was the culmination of an offensive in February 1937 by the combined Nationalist and Italian forces under the command of General Queipo de Llano to eliminate Republican control of the province of Málaga. The participation of Moroccan regulars and Italian tanks from the recently arrived Corpo Truppe Volontarie resulted in a complete rout of the Spanish Republican Army and the capitulation of Málaga in less than a week on 8 February.

The occupation of Málaga led to an exodus of civilians and soldiers on the road to Almería, who were bombarded by Franco's air force, navy cruisers, tanks and artillery on 8 February, causing hundreds of deaths. This episode is known as the "Málaga-Almería road massacre". A local historian recounted that nationalist reprisals after the province was captured resulted in total deaths of over 7,000 people.

=== 1940s and 1950s ===
Until after World War II, Marbella was a small jasmine-lined village with only 900 inhabitants. Ricardo Soriano, Marquis of Ivanrey, moved to Marbella and popularised it among his rich and famous friends. In 1943 he had acquired a country estate located between Marbella and San Pedro called El Rodeo, and later built a resort there called Venta y Albergues El Rodeo, beginning the development of tourism in Marbella.

Soriano's nephew, Prince Alfonso of Hohenlohe-Langenburg, acquired another estate, Finca Santa Margarita, which in 1954 would become the Marbella Club, an international resort of movie stars, business executives and the nobility. Both these resorts would be frequented by members of European aristocratic families, transforming Marbella into a destination for the international jet set.

In the 1950s Torremolinos began to become a popular holiday destination and was visited by international celebrities such as Grace Kelly, Ava Gardner, Marlon Brando, Orson Welles, Brigitte Bardot and Frank Sinatra. The Hotel la Roca had opened in 1942, with the Hotel Pez Espada opening in 1959.

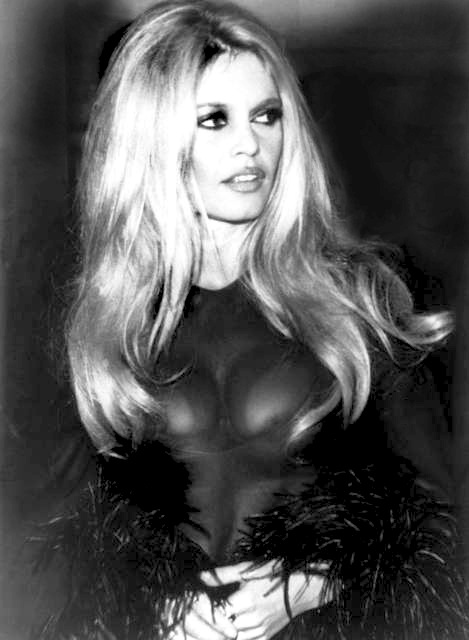
Brigitte Bardot enjoying the nightlife in 1958

=== 1960s and 1970s ===
The Costa del Sol experienced an explosive demographic and economic expansion with the boom in tourism between 1959 and 1974. The name "Costa del Sol" was a brand created specifically to market the Mediterranean coastline of Málaga province to foreign vacationers. Historically the provincial population had lived in the fishing villages, and in the "white" villages (pueblos blancos) a short distance inland in the mountains running down to the coast. The area was developed to meet the demands of international tourism in the 1950s and has since been a popular destination for foreign tourists not only for its beaches but also for its local culture.

The "Spanish miracle" fed itself on the rural exodus which created a new class of industrial workers. The economic boom led to an increase in rapid, largely unplanned building on the periphery of the cities of the Costa del Sol to accommodate the new workers arriving from the countryside. Some cities preserved their historic centres, but most were altered by often haphazard commercial and residential developments. The same fate befell long stretches of scenic coastline as mass tourism exploded.

Torremolinos' popularity as a tourist destination had a domino effect, and in the late 1960s and early 1970s, nearby municipalities such as Benalmadena, Fuengirola and Mijas, also saw a growth in the number of tourists. The 1960s brought a radical change in the appearance of the small fishing villages. Hotels were opened in Nerja and Málaga and promoted by Ricardo Soriano and his nephew Alfonso of Hohenlohe. Marbella became a fashionable destination for aristocrats and the rich. The author Juan Bonilla portrayed the swinging Sixties scene on the Costa del Sol in his non-fiction work of caustic cultural criticism, La Costa del Sol en la hora pop (2007), depicting real-life characters from elderly expatriate Nazis and jailbird criminal politicians to titled aristocratic playboys like Soriano and Hohenlohe.

=== Late 1970s onwards ===
The rebuilding of the Málaga Airport was the decisive improvement to infrastructure that facilitated mass tourism on the coast. Low cost charter flights and holiday packages made it a player on the international market. By the 1970s trips to Spain were the predominant business of the European tour operators, and the Costa del Sol continued to increase in popularity through the decade. This trend coincided with rapid industrial growth in Málaga and the decline of dependence on the agricultural sector, although growth in the general economy of Spain slowed almost to a standstill after 1973.

As rapid development proceeded on the Costa del Sol, and the influx of expatriate retirees from northern European countries, notably Great Britain, increased during the late 1970s and 1980s. It has since then sometimes been referred to in the press of the United Kingdom as the "Costa del Crime", because British criminals would escape justice at home by moving there to live their lives in luxury. The presence of the Italian Camorra in the Costa del Sol is also so strong that Camorra bosses refer to it as Costa Nostra ("Our Coast"), according to Italian journalist Roberto Saviano, a specialist on the Naples criminal underworld. With tense relations between the UK and Spain over Gibraltar, extradition arrangements were not at that time agreed. This phenomenon has been alluded to in films and television shows such as Auf Wiedersehen, Pet, Bad Girls, The Cook Report, and The Olsen Gang on the Track, as well as in the more recent films Sexy Beast and The Business. Some of the more famous British criminals known to have fled to the Costa del Sol in the past were Charlie Wilson, Ronnie Knight, Freddie Foreman, Anthony Fraser (grandson of Mad Frankie Fraser), and more recently "The Doctor" also known by the initials, "IRDM", a well-known figure in boiler room operations including irdmbrokers and armed robber Andrew Moran. John Disley, nicknamed the "King of Marbella", (not to be confused with the international criminal Monzer al-Kassar whose nickname is the "Prince of Marbella") masterminded a £700,000 bank fraud. Other European criminal entrepreneurs, many of Russian and Dutch origin, have also settled on this coast for the climate and functional advantages for their enterprises, as well as being active investors in the property sector.

The Costa del Sol welcomed millions of tourists annually. Visitors arriving by airplane can land at either Málaga Airport, Granada Airport or Gibraltar International Airport. and head to one of the resorts located along this stretch of coastline from Manilva in the west to Nerja in the east.

== Transport ==
Since 1998 the Port of Málaga has been undergoing renovation and expansion as part of the project called the Plan Especial del Puerto de Málaga. There are major projects underway or planned which will radically change the image of the port and surrounding areas. The traffic of goods rose from 2,261,828 metric tonnes in 2010 and more than doubled to 5,448,260 tonnes in 2011.

=== Passenger ===
Cruise shipping has become an essential industry at the port and a major driver of investment in Málaga. In 2012 there were 651,517 passengers visiting the city on board cruise ships calling at the port, including those who started or ended their cruise in Málaga. The development of the cruise industry is proceeding with a new passenger terminal, port museum, and environmental education centre planned for inclusion in the cruise ship facilities at Quay 2. A commercial marina will also operate from Quay 1, catering to 24 super-yachts of up to 30 metres, and the Eastern Quay passenger terminal will be remodeled to improve pedestrian access and double existing capacity to 560,000 passengers a year.

The four ports of Marbella are primarily recreational; although both Puerto Banús and the Puerto de la Bajadilla are permitted to dock cruise ships, neither operates regular service to other ports. The port of Bajadilla is also home to the fishermen's guild of Marbella and is used for the transport of goods.

AVE (Alta Velocidad Española, AVE), a high-speed rail service operated by Renfe, the Spanish national railway company, inaugurated the Córdoba-Málaga high-speed rail line, a standard gauge railway line 155 kilometres (96 mi) in length, on 24 December 2007. Designed for speeds of 300 km/h (186 mph) and compatibility with neighbouring countries' rail systems, it connects Málaga and Córdoba. The proposed Costa del Sol railway would link Málaga with Marbella and Estepona.

== Gastronomy ==
Native cuisine on the Costa del Sol, as in the rest of Andalusia, has been influenced historically by Spanish, Jewish and Arabic traditions, and emphasises seafood. Pescaíto frito, small fish breaded without egg and fried in olive oil, then served with fresh lemon, is a universally popular dish. Gazpacho is a famous refreshing cold soup made of raw tomatoes, cucumber, onions, green peppers, garlic, bread, oil and vinegar. Tortillas, Spanish omelettes made with potatoes and served cold, are typical, and a plate of thin-sliced jamón serrano, or dry-cured ham, with a glass of sherry or Málaga wine is a traditional combination. The Ir de Tapas (Tapas tour) is a popular activity where one visits various bars and restaurants to eat Tapas. Some bars will serve a tapa for free when one orders a drink. Churros, fried-dough pastries served hot and dipped in café con leche or hot chocolate are a typical breakfast food.

Chiringuitos, small, open-air beachside restaurants, offer respite from the summer heat of the cities in the high holiday season.

== Image gallery ==
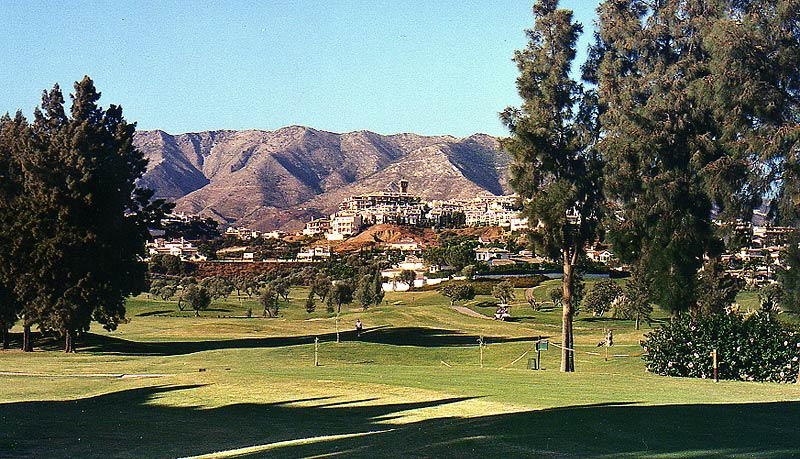

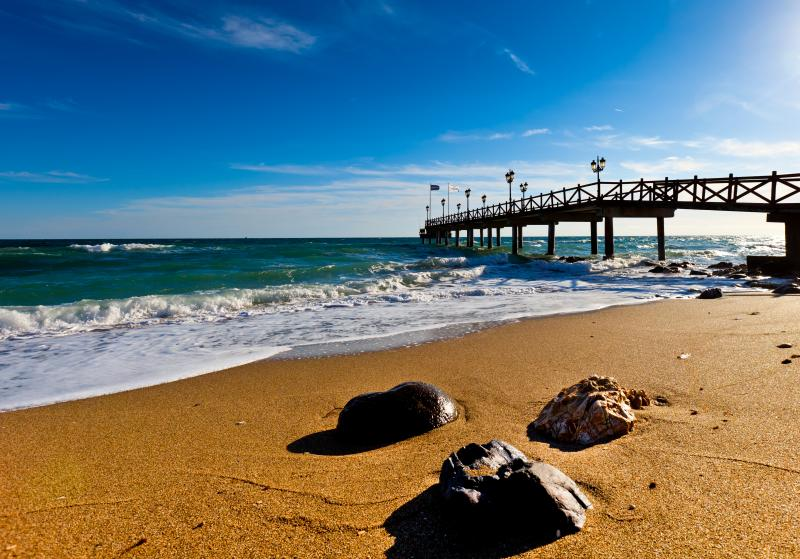

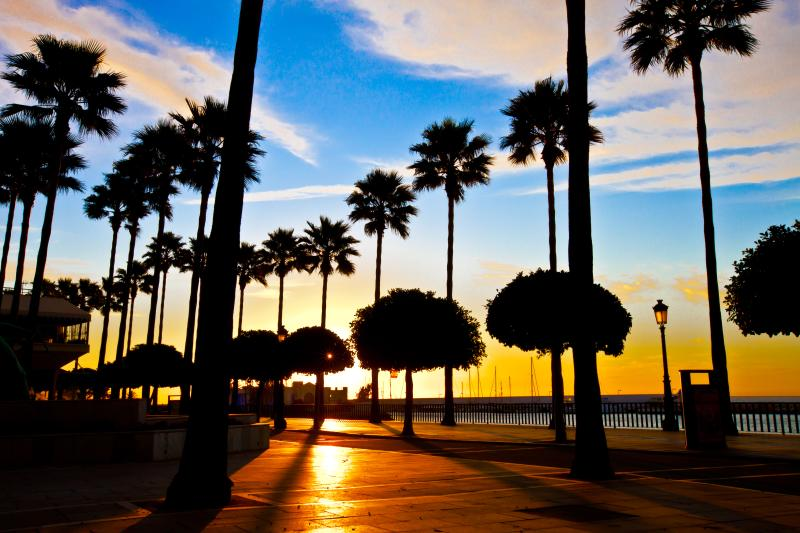

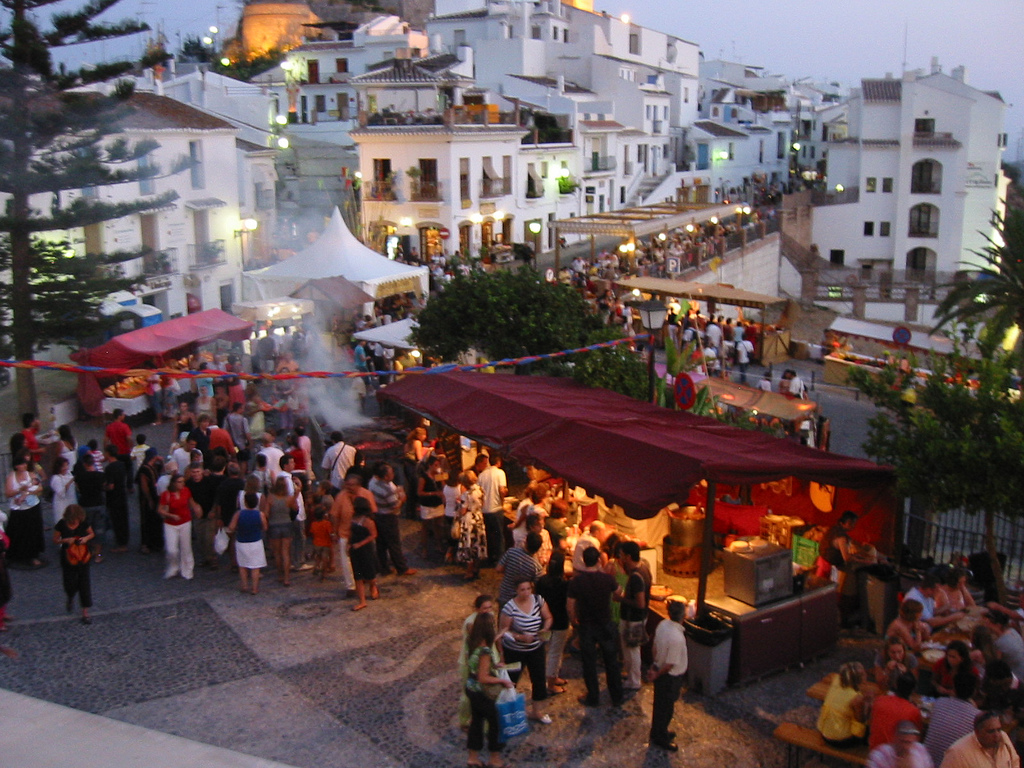

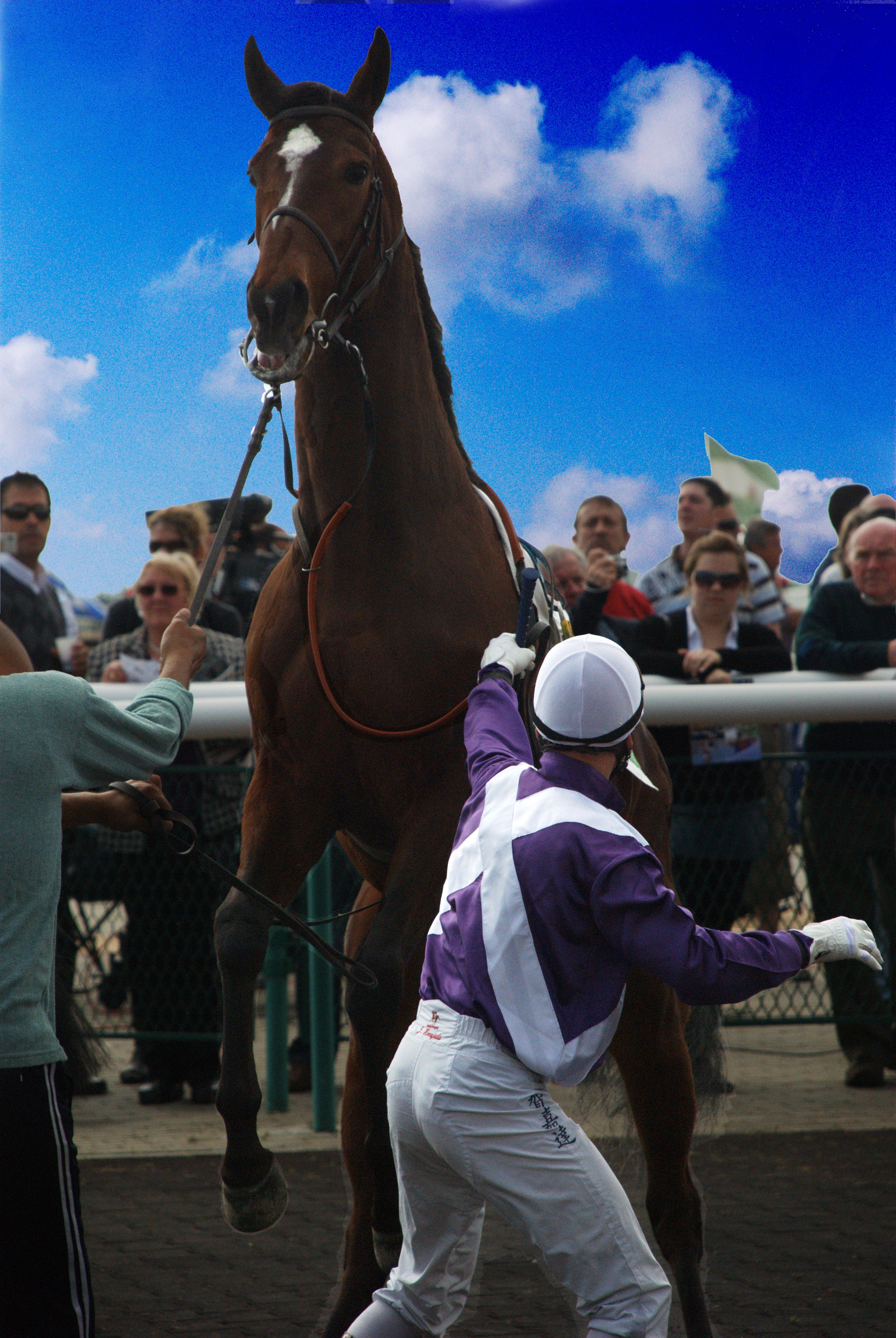

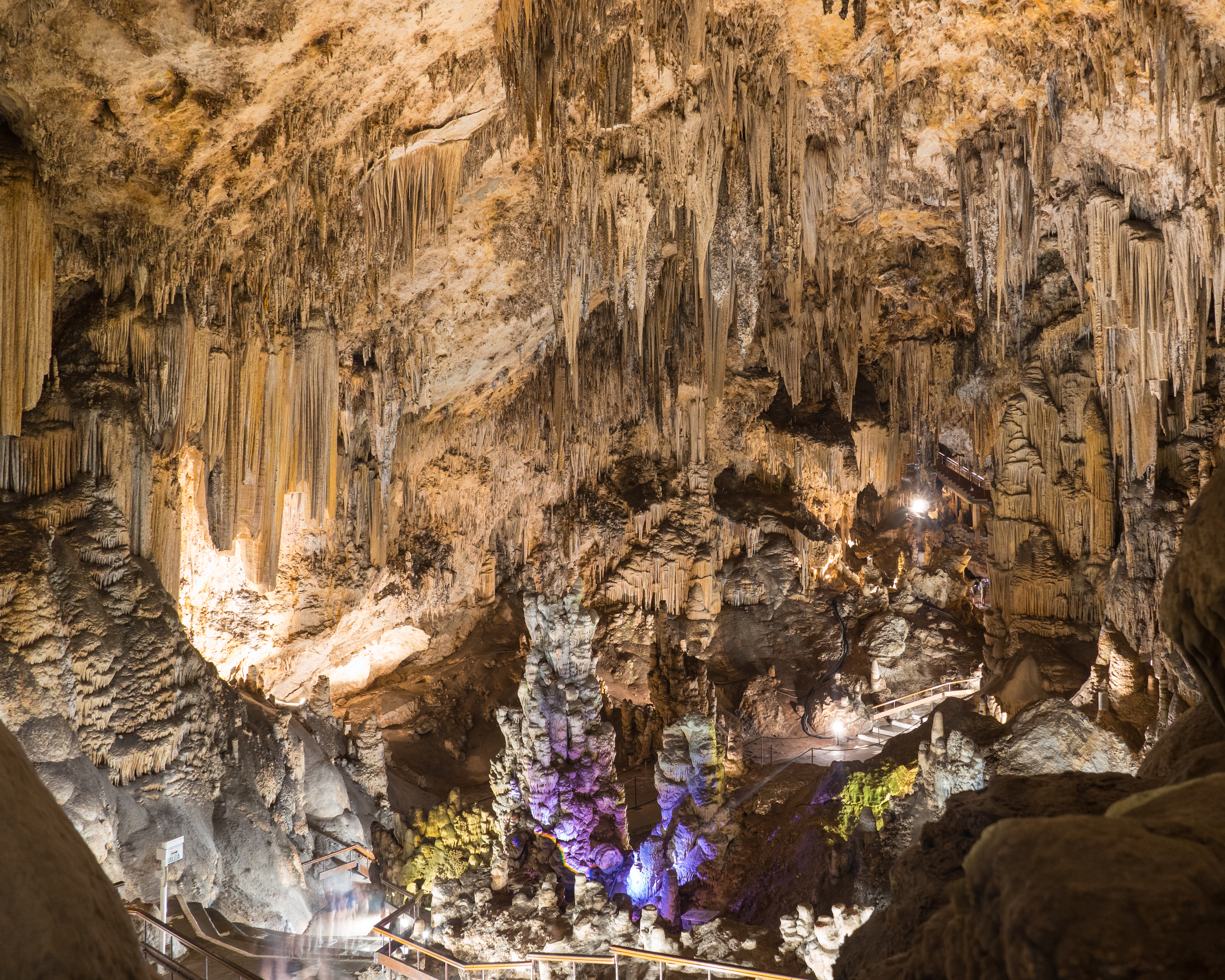

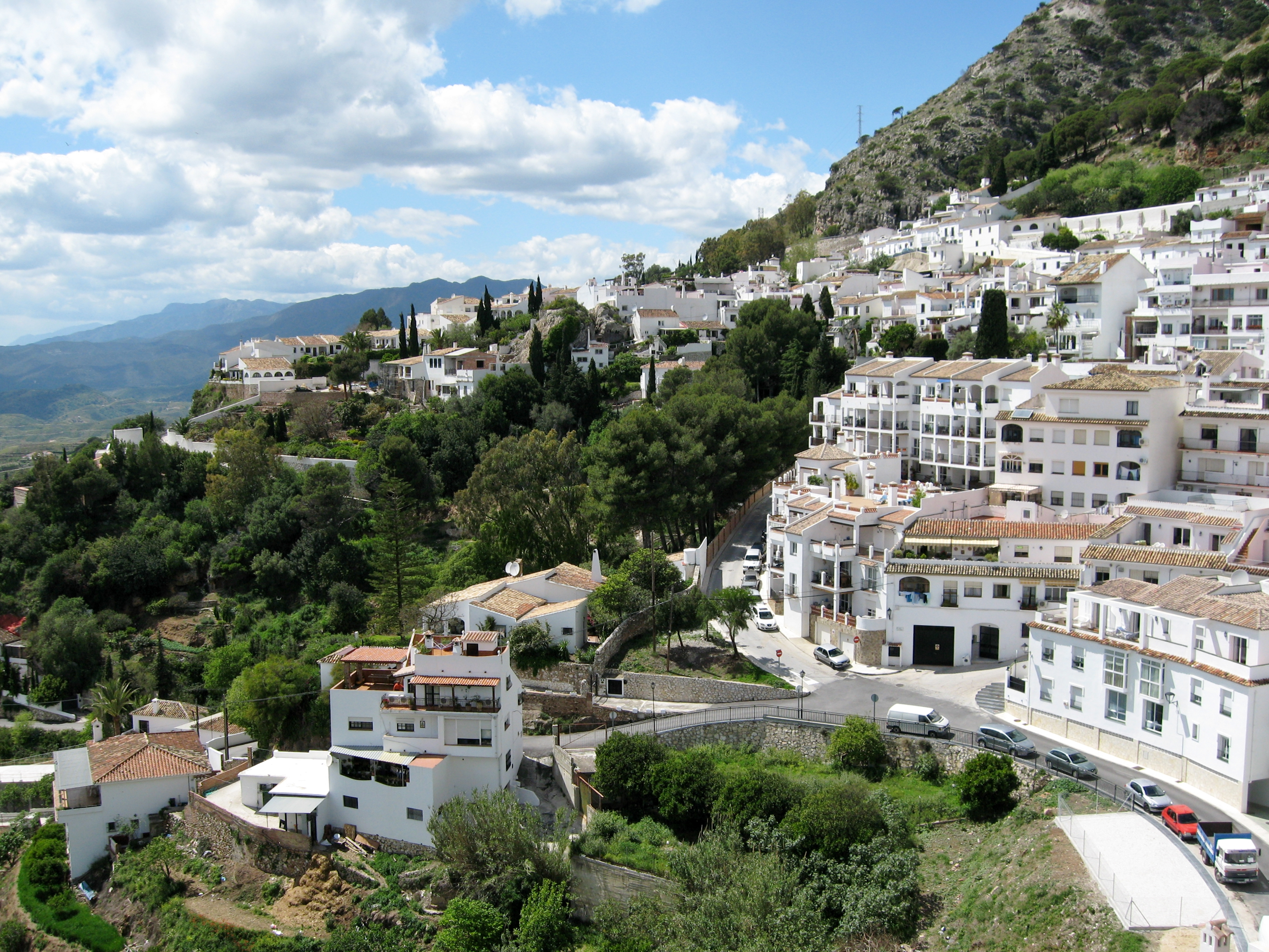

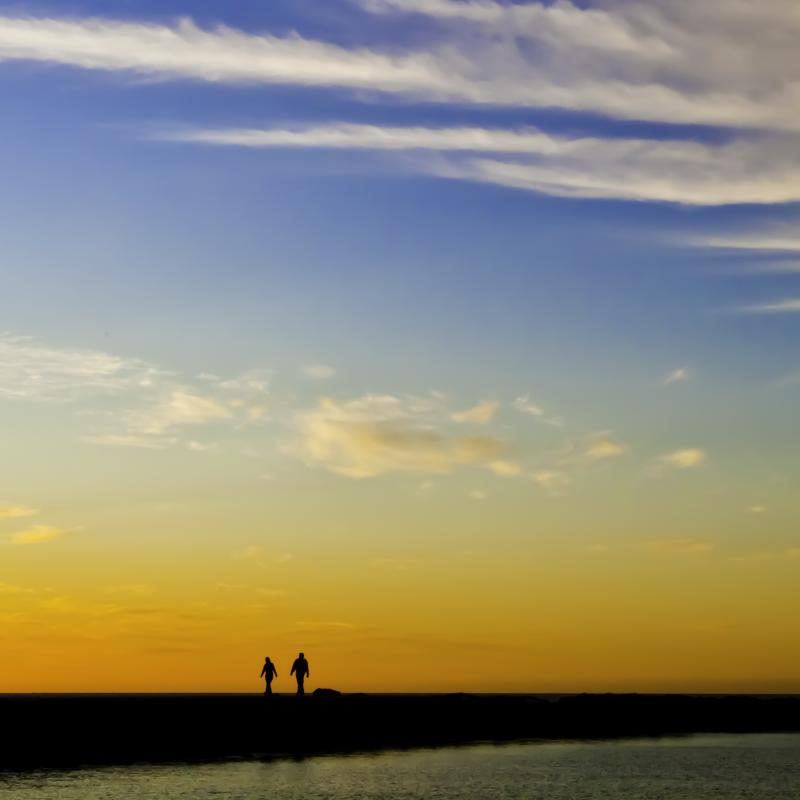

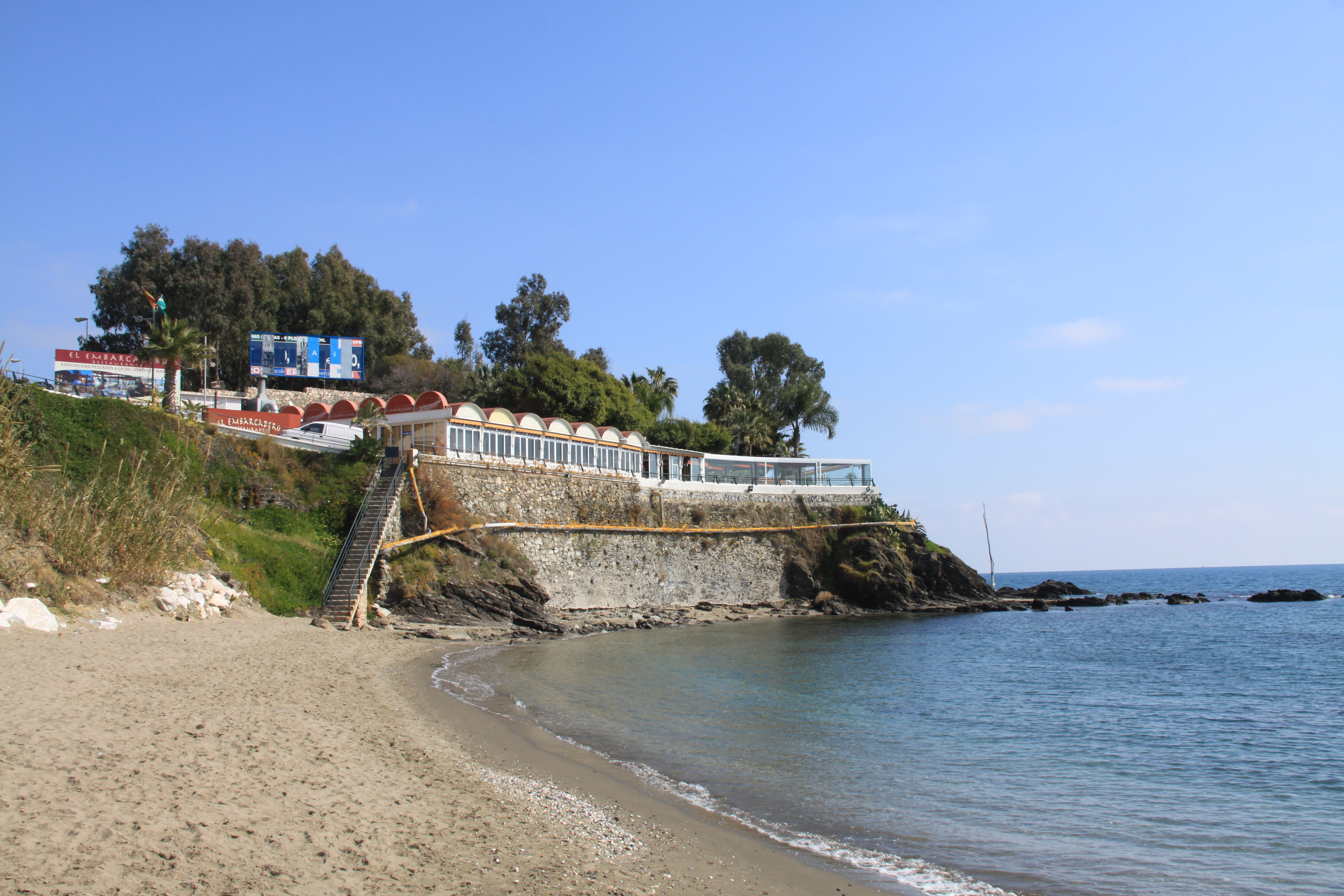

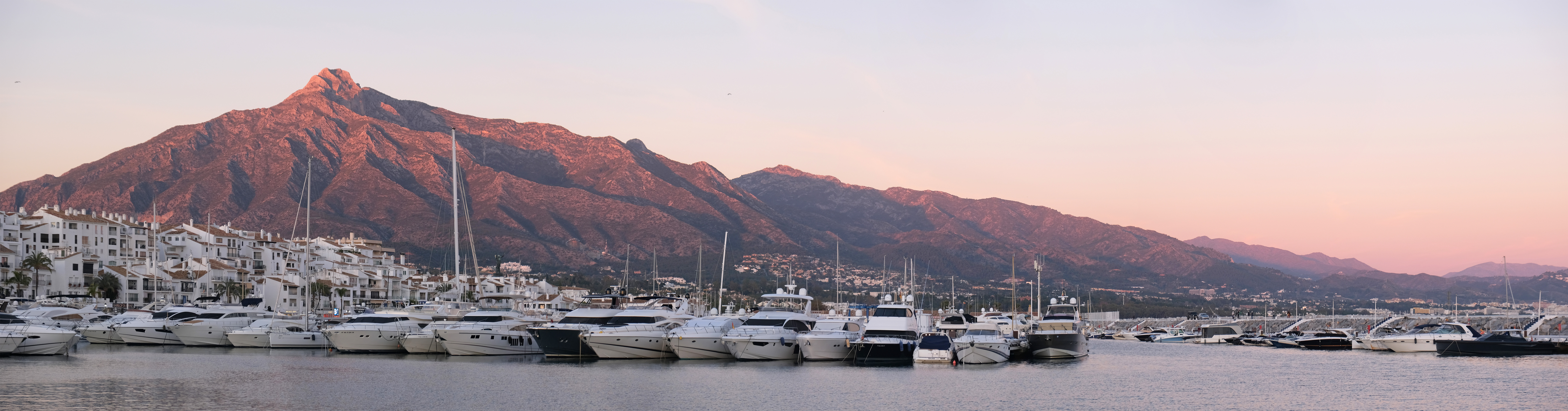

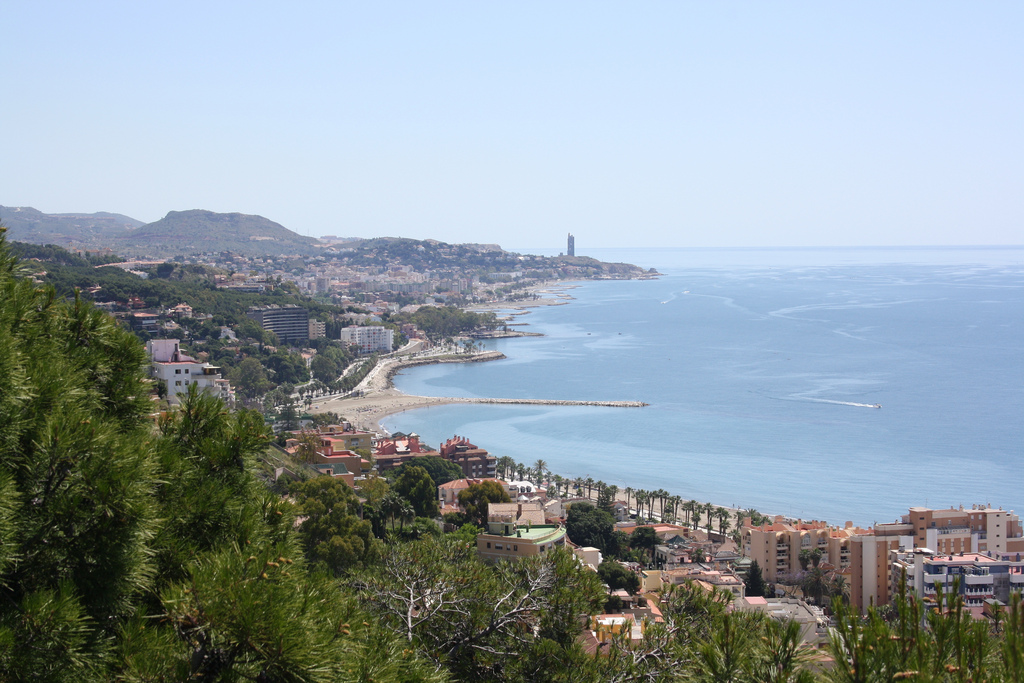
