= Prince Alfonso of Hohenlohe-Langenburg =

Spanish businessman (1924–2003)

Prince Alfonso
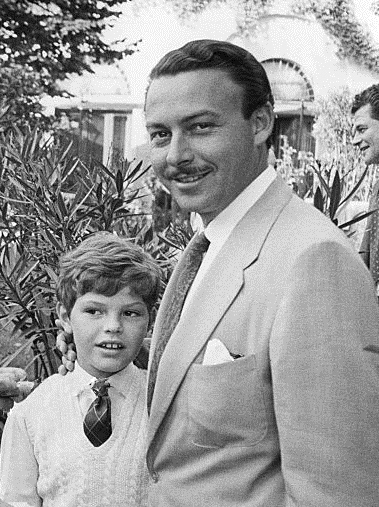
- Prince Alfonso (right) with his brother-in-law Prince Egon von Fürstenberg in 1955
- Born: 28 May 1924; Madrid, Spain
- Died: 21 December 2003 (aged 79); Marbella, Spain
- Burial: Cemetery of Saint Barnabas, Marbella, Spain
- Spouse: Princess Ira von Fürstenberg (m. 1955; div. 1960) Jocelyn Lane (m. 1973; div. 1985) Marilys Healing (m. 1991; died 2000)
- Issue: Prince Christoph of Hohenlohe-Langenburg; Prince Hubertus of Hohenlohe-Langenburg; Princess Arriana of Hohenlohe-Langenburg; Désirée zu Hohenlohe
Names
- Alfonso Maximiliano Victorio Eugenio Alejandro María Pablo de la Santísima Trinidad y Todos los Santos
- House: Hohenlohe-Langenburg
- Father: Prince Maximilian Egon zu Hohenlohe-Langenburg
- Mother: María de la Piedad de Yturbe y von Scholtz-Hermensdorff, Marquesa de Belvís de las Navas

Alfonso Maximiliano Victorio Eugenio Alejandro María Pablo de la Santísima Trinidad y Todos los Santos, Prinz zu Hohenlohe-Langenburg (28 May 1924 – 21 December 2003) was a Spanish businessman known for his promotion of the Spanish resorts of Marbella and the Costa del Sol. He also founded the Marbella Club Hotel.

== Background ==
He was born in Madrid as the eldest son of Prince Maximilian Egon zu Hohenlohe-Langenburg (1897–1968) and his wife, María de la Piedad de Yturbe y von Scholtz-Hermensdorff, Marquesa de Belvís de las Navas (1892–1990). She was known as Piedita and was the daughter of Don Manuel Adrián de Yturbe y del Villar (Mexican ambassador to St. Petersburg, Vienna, Paris and Madrid) and María de la Trinidad von Scholtz-Hermensdorff y Caravaca, Marquesa de Belvís de las Navas.

On his father's side, Alfonso came from an ancient German House of Hohenlohe which traced its history to the 12th century and whose members were reigning Princes of the Holy Roman Empire in Württemberg until Napoleon I's invasion. He descended from a younger, Catholic line that had inherited properties in Bohemia during the 19th century. His mother Piedad was Marquesa de Belvís de las Navas and a granddaughter of Don Francisco-María de Yturbe, Mexican Minister of Finance, who was of Basque origin. King Alfonso XIII of Spain was his godfather at a christening in the royal palace.

Alfonso had five siblings – Maria Francesca (known as Pimpinella, his eldest sister, Marquesa de Belvís de las Navas), Christian, Elisabeth, Max Emanuel and Beatrice (known as Teñu).

The hereditary wealth of the Hohenlohe family was depleted in the 20th century. His mother lost estates in the Mexican Revolution, and after the fall of the Third Reich, properties in Germany and Czechoslovakia disappeared behind the Iron Curtain.

== Early life ==
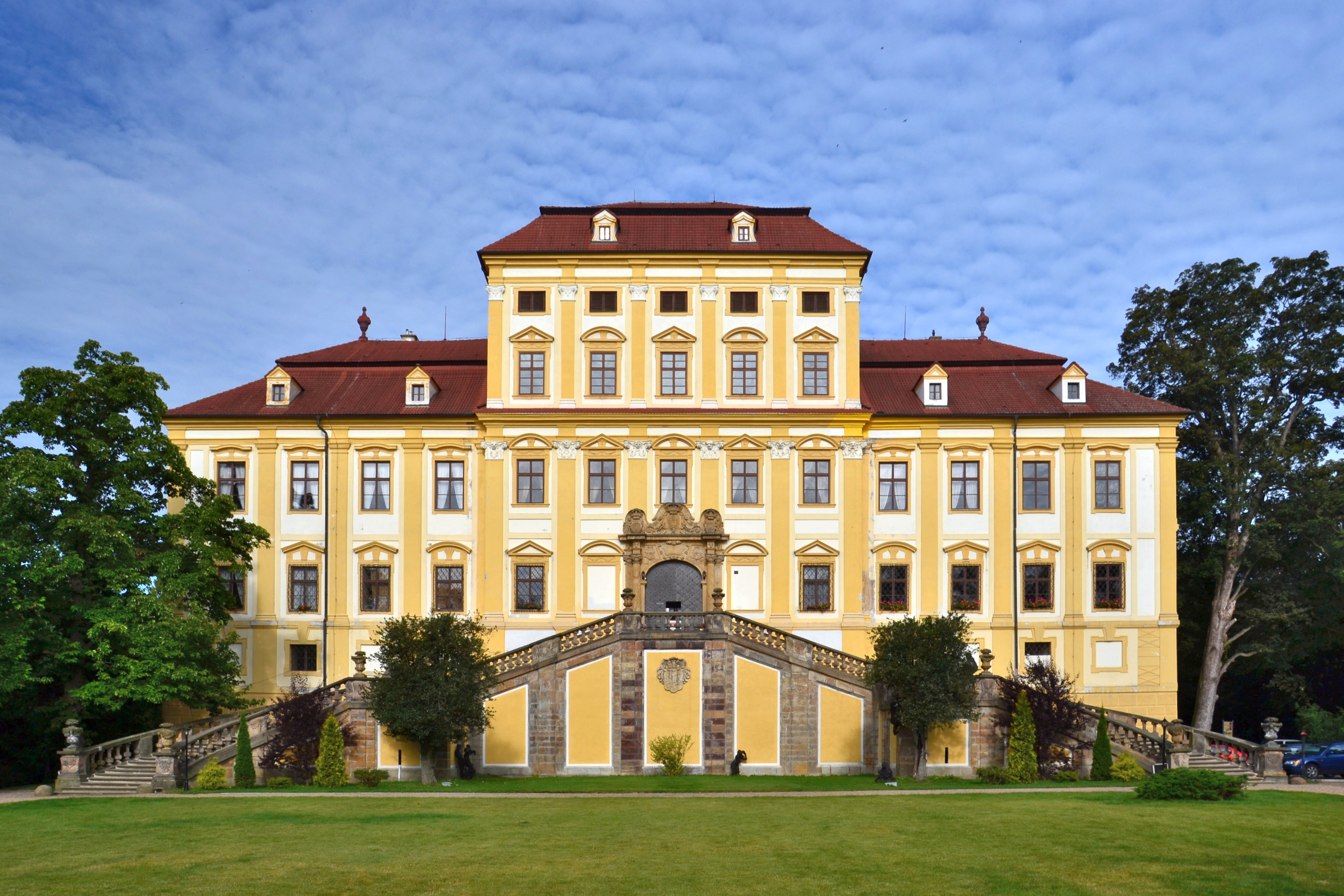
Rothenhaus Castle (Červený Hrádek), Czech Republic

Alfonso was educated by private tutors in Bohemia and Spain, learning fluent German, Spanish, French and English. His father owned Rothenhaus Castle (today Červený Hrádek Castle in Jirkov, Czech Republic) where he tried to prevent the occupation of Czechoslovakia by Hitler in 1938 through diplomatic negotiations with the British government. In August 1938, the British mediator in the dispute between Germany and Czechoslovakia over the Sudetenland, Lord Runciman, met the leader of the Sudeten German Party (SdP), Konrad Henlein, at Rothenhaus Castle − to no avail. During World War II, Prince Max Egon of Hohenlohe-Langenburg, without having an official function, tried several times in vain to prevent a further escalation of the war in Europe, to contribute to an agreement with Great Britain in the summer of 1940 and from 1942 he repeatedly conspired with diplomats of the Allies with the aim of removing Hitler from power. After World War II, Prince Max Egon was expropriated by the communist government of the Czechoslovak Socialist Republic.

Alfonso then moved with his parents to Spain. There he discovered the idyllic fishing village Marbella on a trip and decided to buy land there in 1947. He sold plots to various rich and powerful friends, including the Rothschild and Thyssen families and Ferdinand von Bismarck. In 1954 he created the Marbella Club, the Costa del Sol's first luxury hotel, attracting many celebrities of the time to the former fishing village. On 3 August 1954, he survived a plane crash in Preston, Connecticut.

The family fortune was replenished by Alfonso's marriage in 1955 to the 15-year-old Austrian-Italian Princess Ira von Fürstenberg, a Fiat heiress. The bride's youth evoked some scandal in high society, but the couple had obtained a papal dispensation for the marriage and 400 guests attended a 16-day wedding party. Five years later, the marriage was dissolved by divorce in Mexico City after Ira left him to marry notorious 1950s playboy Francisco "Baby" Pignatari, another papal dispensation being obtained, this time for an annulment, from the Church in 1969.

== Later life ==
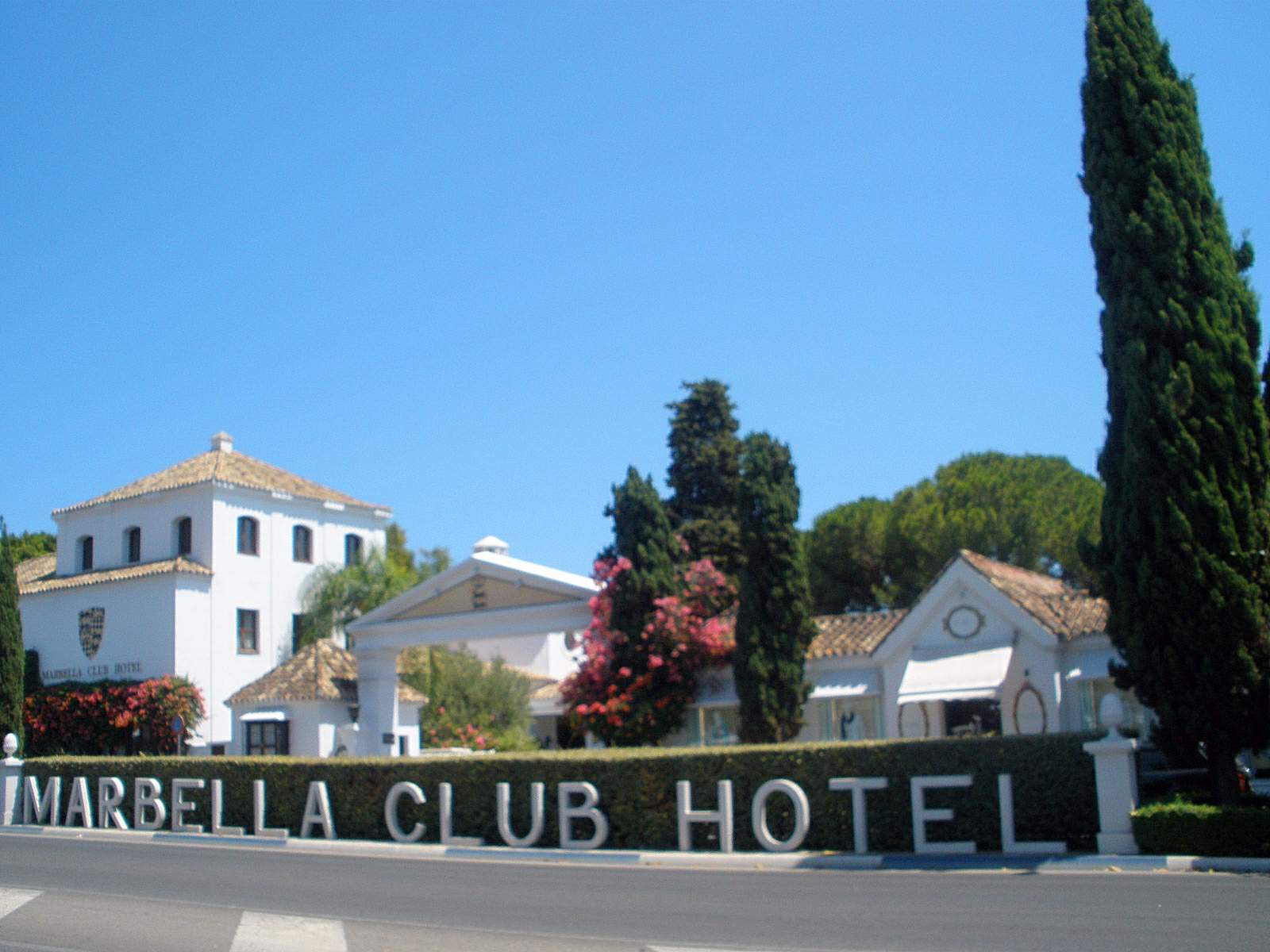
The Marbella Club Hotel

After the divorce, the prince had much-publicised relationships with actresses Ava Gardner and Kim Novak. In 1973, he married actress Jocelyn Lane. This too was a stormy partnership, and ended in divorce in 1985.

In the 1990s, the property speculator Jesus Gil y Gil became mayor of Marbella, and the town entered a construction boom. The prince pulled out, selling his shares in the Marbella Club due to the area's increasing association with Arab arms traffickers and Russian mafia, whose conspicuous consumption was peppered with violence. He moved to the town of Ronda and successfully turned his efforts to wine-making, with new wife Marilys Haynes. His last wife died on 2 November 2000, apparently taking her own life, the same year he learned he had prostate cancer.

== Marriages and issue ==
- He married his first wife HSH Princess Ira zu Fürstenberg on 17 September 1955 (civil) and 21 September 1955 (religious) in Venice, Italy; and the couple were divorced in 1960, annulled in 1969. They had two sons: Prince Christoph "Kiko" von Hohenlohe (1956–2006) and Prince Hubertus of Hohenlohe-Langenburg (1959–).
- He married his second wife Jocelyn Lane on 3 May 1973, in Marbella, with whom he had a daughter Princess Arriana Theresa (b. 1975).
- He married Marilys Healing (1941–2000) on 15 February 1991, in Vaduz.
- With former model Heidi Balzer he also has extramarital daughter, Désirée, Countess d'Ursel (b. 1980).

== Death ==
Alfonso died in Marbella on 21 December 2003, at the age of 79. He is buried in Cementerio de San Bernabe, Marbella, Spain.

== Ancestry ==
Ancestors of Prince Alfonso of Hohenlohe-Langenburg

8. Prince Louis of Hohenlohe-Langenburg
4. Prince Gottfried of Hohenlohe-Langenburg
9. Countess Gabriele von Trauttmansdorff-Weinsberg
2. Prince Max Egon of Hohenlohe-Langenburg
10. Erwin, Count von Schönborn-Buchheim
5. Countess Anna von Schönborn-Buchheim
11. Countess Franziska von Trauttmansdorff-Weinsberg
1. Prince Alfonso of Hohenlohe-Langenburg
12. Francisco María de Yturbe y Anciola
6. Manuel Adrián de Yturbe y del Villar
13. Cipriana del Villar y Baquero
3. María de la Piedad de Yturbe y von Scholtz-Hersmendorff, Marquesa de Belvís de las Navas
14. Enrique von Scholtz-Hermensdorff y Caravaca, Marques de Belvís de las Navas
7. María de la Trinidad von Scholtz-Hermensdorff y Caravaca, Marquesa de Belvís de las Navas
15. María Carlota de Behr y Grund
