= Puerto Banús =

- Town and marina
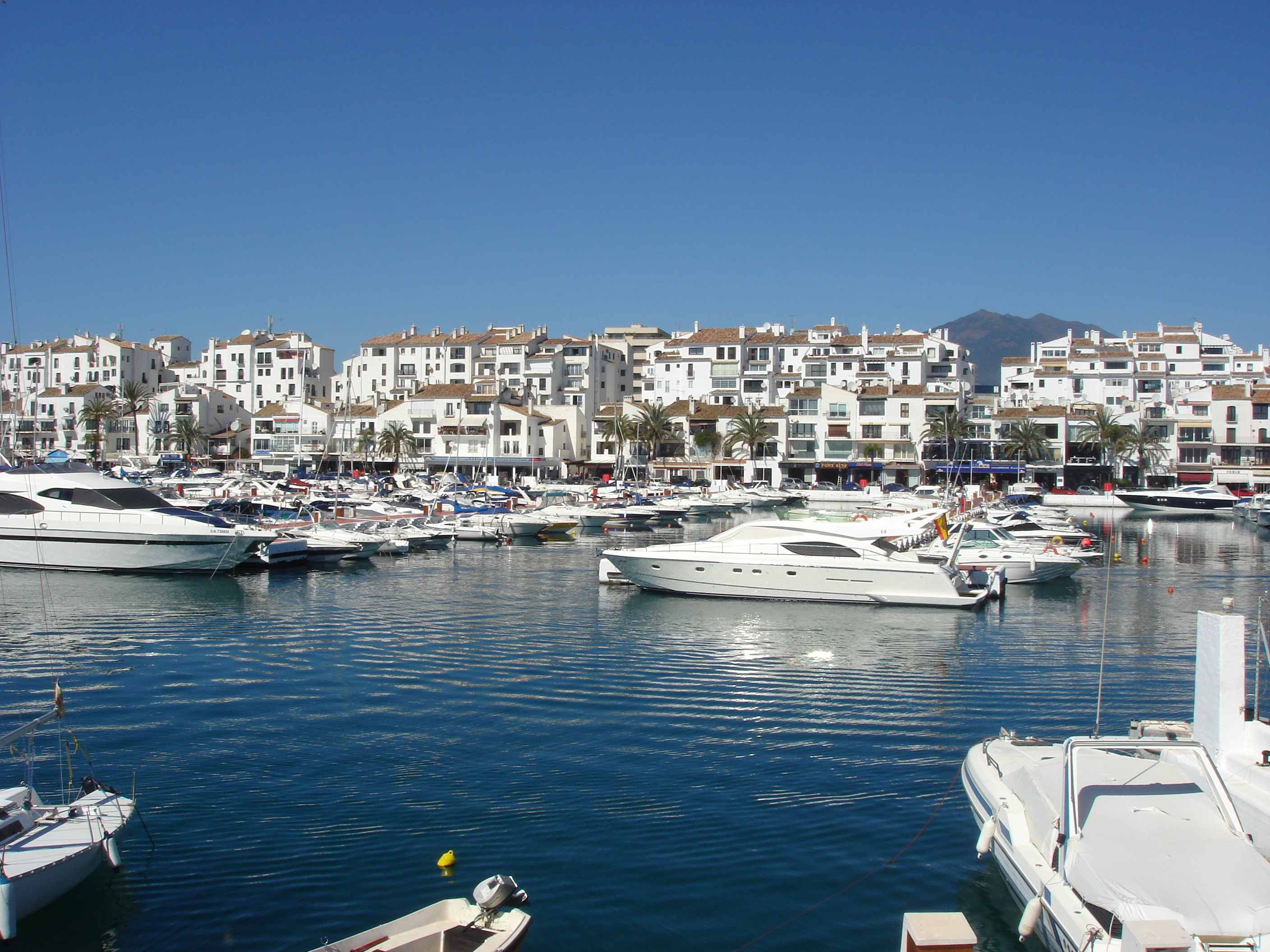
- Nickname: The St. Tropez of Andalucia
- Location in Andalusia
- Coordinates: 36°29′15″N 4°57′09″W
- Country: Spain
- Autonomous community: Andalusia
- Province: Málaga
- Comarca: Costa del Sol Occidental

Government
  - Type: Mayor–council
  - Body: Ayuntamiento de Marbella
  - Mayor: María Ángeles Muñoz Uriol (PP)
- Time zone: UTC+1 (CET)
  - Summer (DST): UTC+2 (CEST)

Puerto José Banús, more commonly known simply as Puerto Banús, is a marina located in the area of Nueva Andalucía, to the southwest of Marbella, Spain on the Costa del Sol. It was built in May 1970 by José Banús (1906-1984), a local property developer, as a luxury marina and shopping complex. It has since become one of the largest entertainment centres in the Costa del Sol, with 5 million annual visitors, and is popular with international celebrities. Developed around a coastal village in the Mediterranean architectural style, Puerto Banús contains high-end shopping malls, restaurants and bars around the marina.

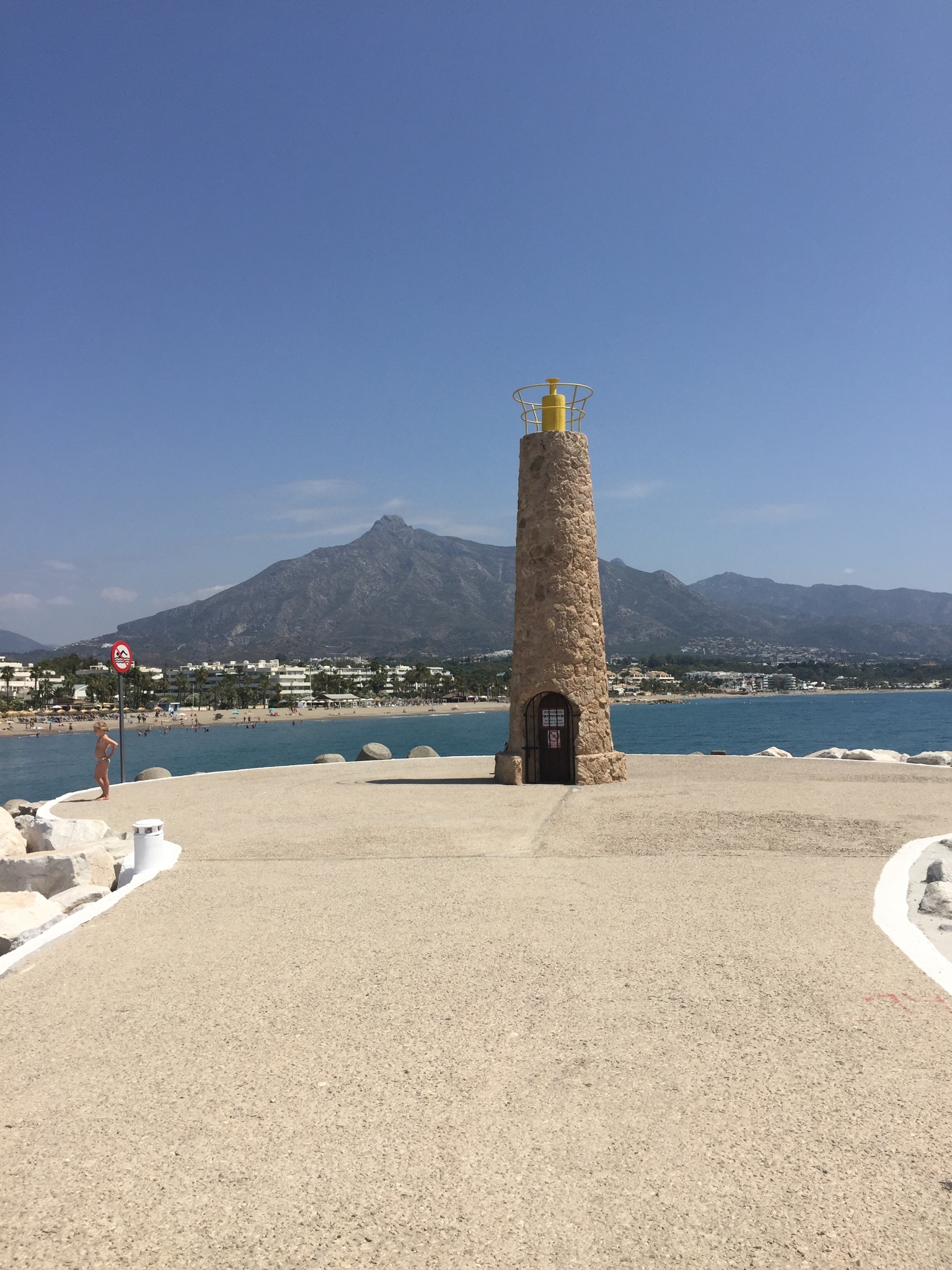
Lighthouse on the Puerto Banús Beach

== History ==
The architect Noldi Schreck, who had previously contributed to the design and construction of Beverly Hills, was visited in 1966 by Prince Alfonso de Hohenlohe, who asked him to work on the Hotel Marbella Club. Schreck's first assignment was to meet José Banús—a close associate of Francisco Franco—and convince him that Puerto Banús should not be developed with towering skyscrapers meant to accommodate thousands of wealthy families.

Instead, Schreck, together with young Mexican-Spanish architect Marcos Sainz, proposed a design inspired by a traditional Andalusian village with a luxurious marina. Their vision led to the creation of the first port designed entirely by a single architectural team. José Banús adopted the plan, and the port was eventually named after him. He would go on to become the largest developer of residential tourism complexes on the Costa del Sol, gaining notoriety as "the regime's builder."

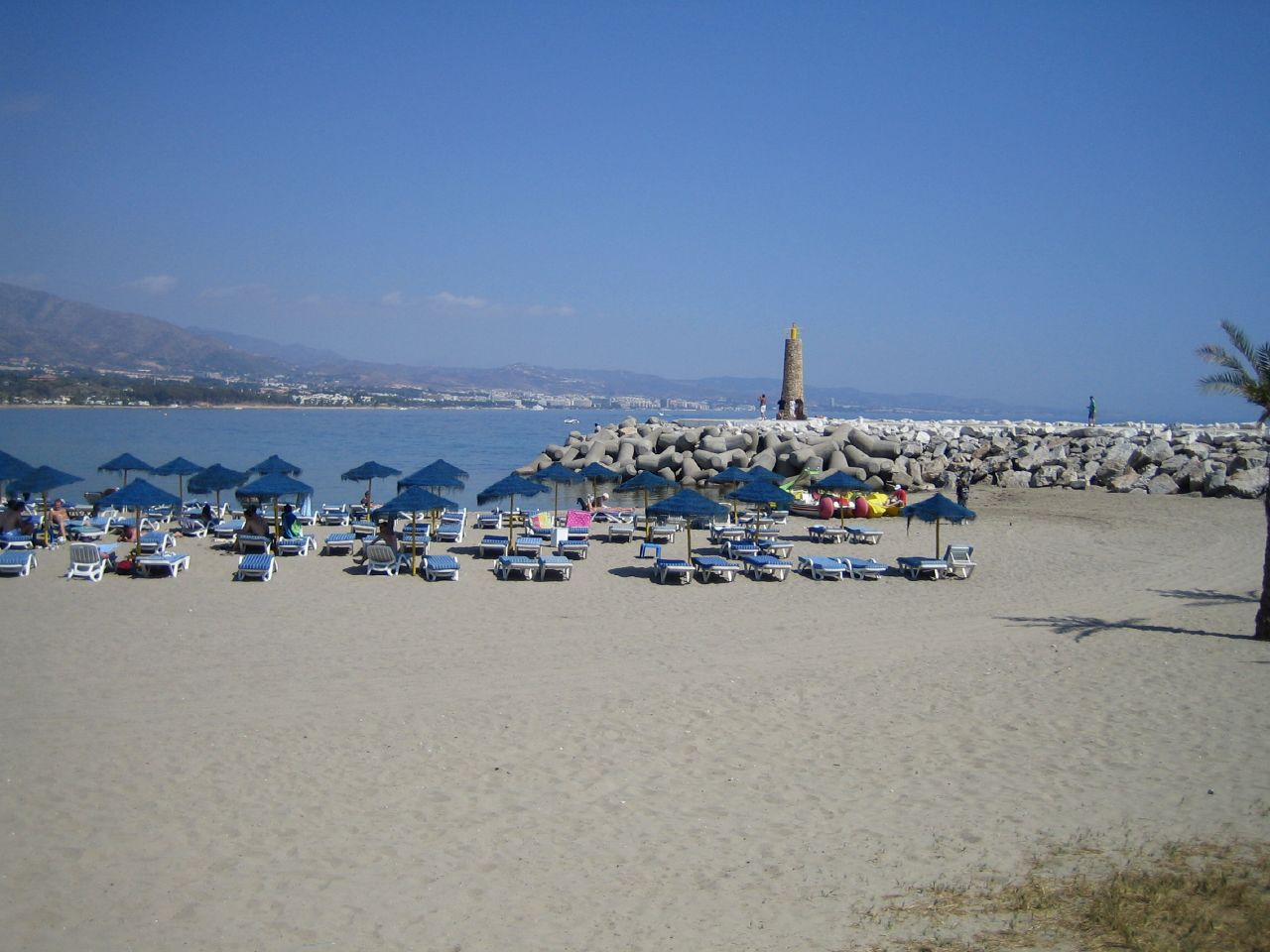
Beach of Puerto Banús

The lavish opening of the complex in May 1970 was attended by, amongst others, the Aga Khan, film director Roman Polanski, Playboy founder Hugh Hefner, Dr. Christiaan Barnard (pioneer of the heart transplant), and Prince Rainier and Princess Grace of Monaco. A young Julio Iglesias was hired to sing for the guests for the sum of 125,000 pesetas. Three hundred waiters from Seville served 22 kilos of beluga caviar to 1,700 guests.

In 2011, it was reported that one of the largest-scale developments in Marbella's history was to take place with a 400 million euro investment into La Bajadilla, east of Marbella, by Qatari Sheikh Abdullah bin Nasser bin Khalifa Al Thani which included a 200-metre (660 ft) quay for cruise liners, a five-star hotel on the marina, as well as bars, restaurants, shops and supermarkets to compete with Puerto Banús.

== Geography and climate ==
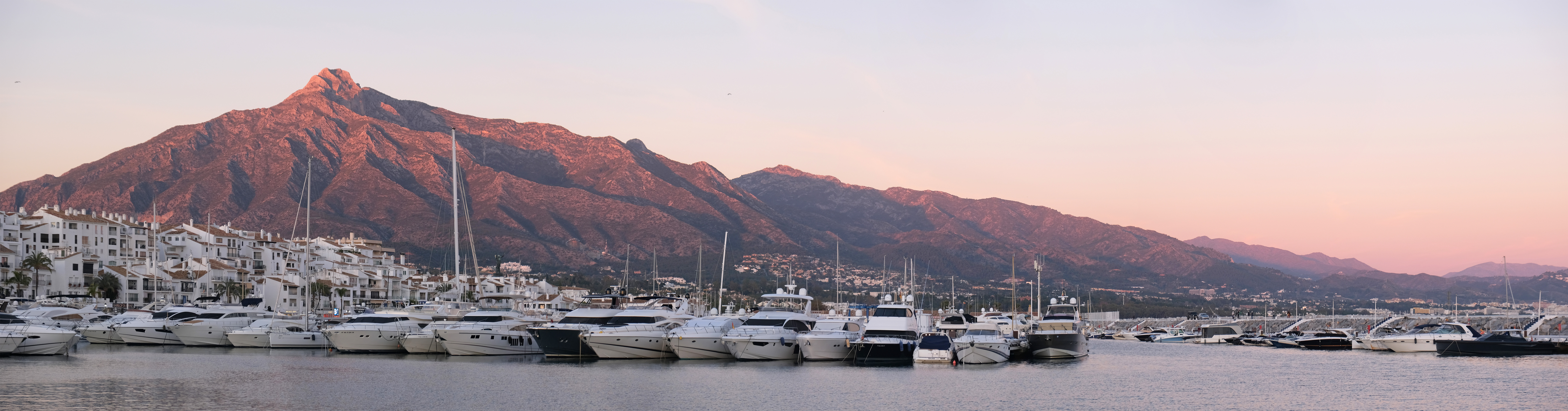
A panoramic view of Puerto Banús yacht harbour

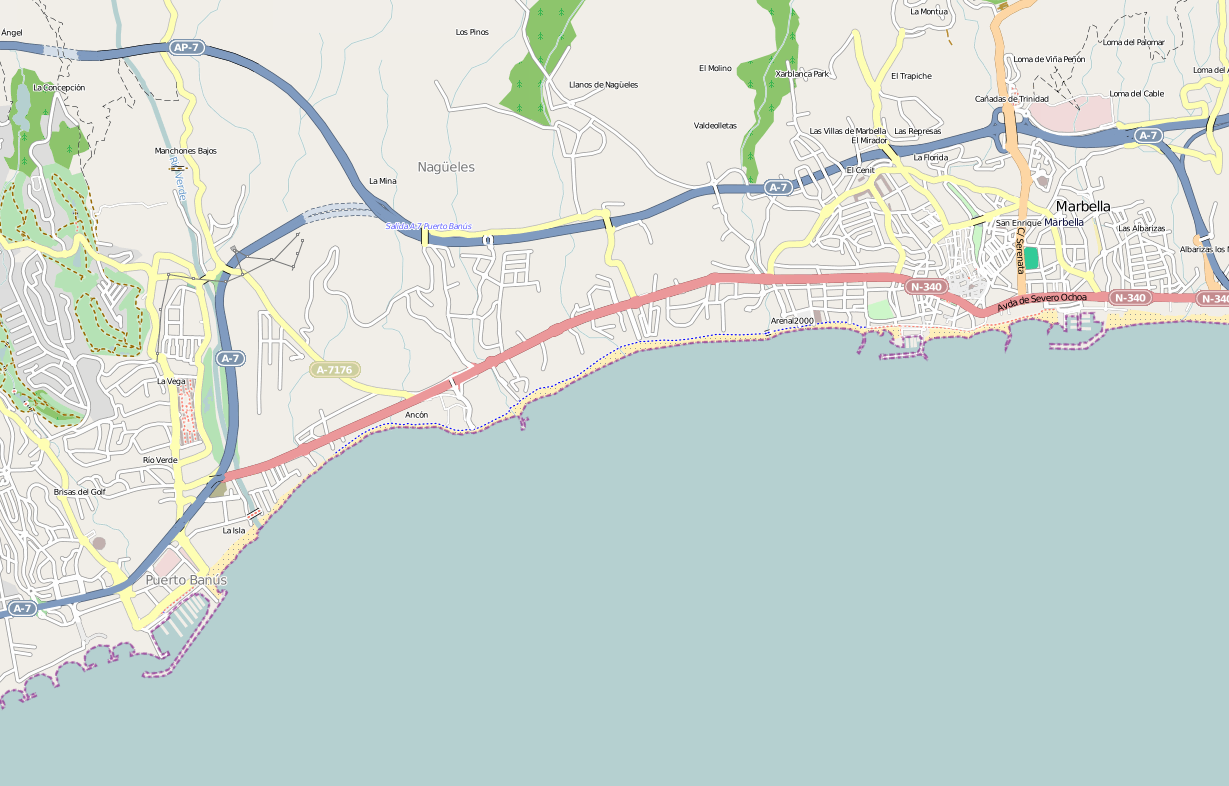
Map showing Puerto Banús in relation to Marbella.

Puerto Banús is located on the Costa del Sol of southeast Spain, 6 km (3.7 mi) southwest of Marbella, 64 km (40 mi) southwest of Málaga and 782 km (486 mi) south of Madrid. The climate of the area is protected in its northern part by the Coast Mountain Range of Cordillera Penibética. It has a microclimate that produces a mean annual temperature of 18 °C (64 °F).

== Transportation ==
The Málaga Airport is 60 km (37 mi) away. There is a good network of roads and transport services connecting Puerto Banús with adjacent towns and suburbs.

== The complex ==
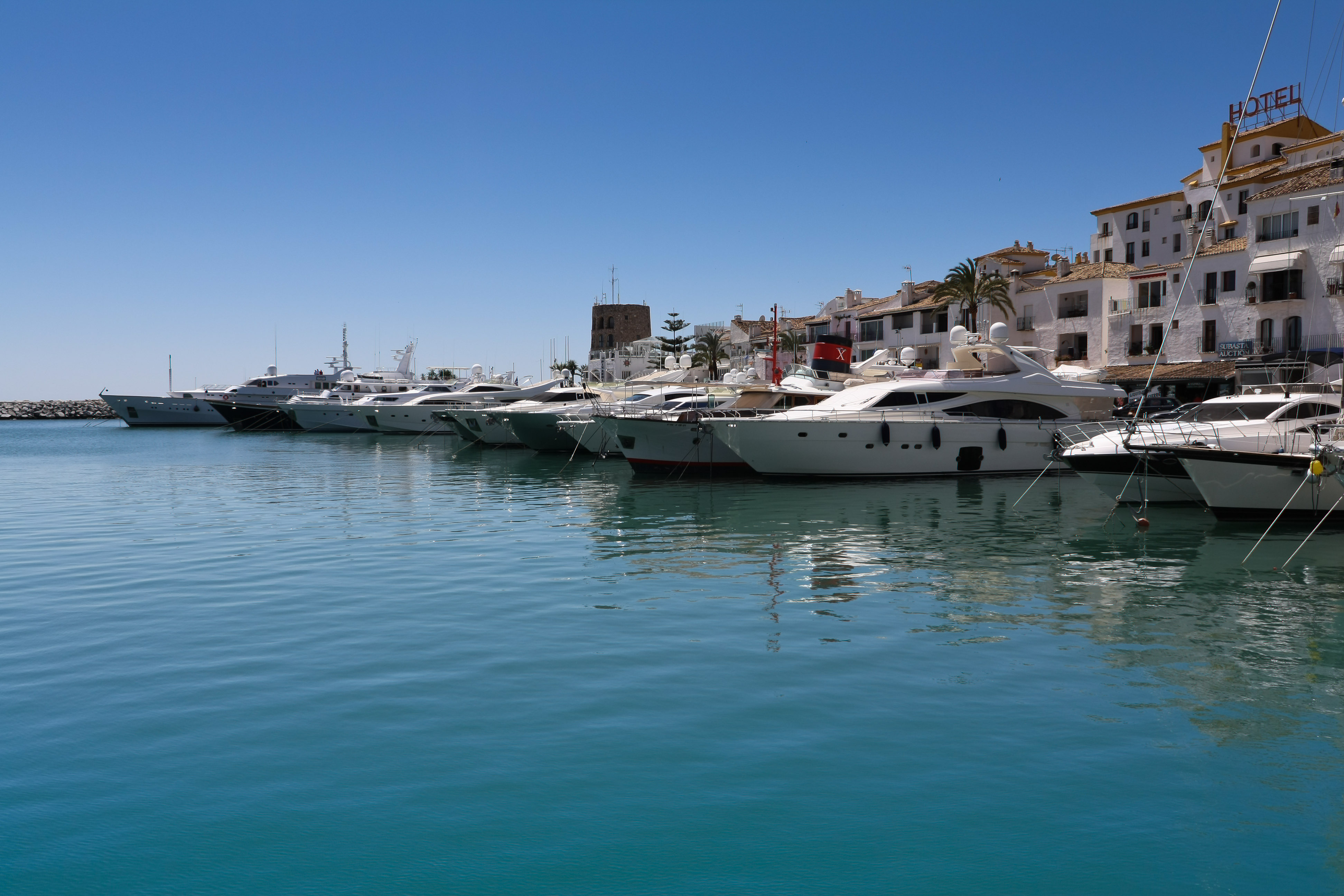
The marina

According to the Municipality of Marbella, Puerto Banús is visited annually by nearly 5 million people. Visitors to the port tend to be mostly tourists from northern Europe (especially United Kingdom) and Arabs (especially Kuwait and Saudi Arabia), along with Spanish and Russian tourists. The focal point of Puerto Banús is the marina. It has berths for 915 boats, including those of the King of Saudi Arabia and several of the world's wealthiest individuals. Behind the harbour lie streets filled with bars, boutiques and nightclubs. The marina has slips for boats and ships from 8–50 metres (26–164 ft). Its surface area is 15 hectares (37 acres), and its depth ranges from 3–6 metres (9.8–19.7 ft) within the marina, with 7.5 metres (25 ft) at its entrance. There is a beach on each side of the marina where boats can be hired.

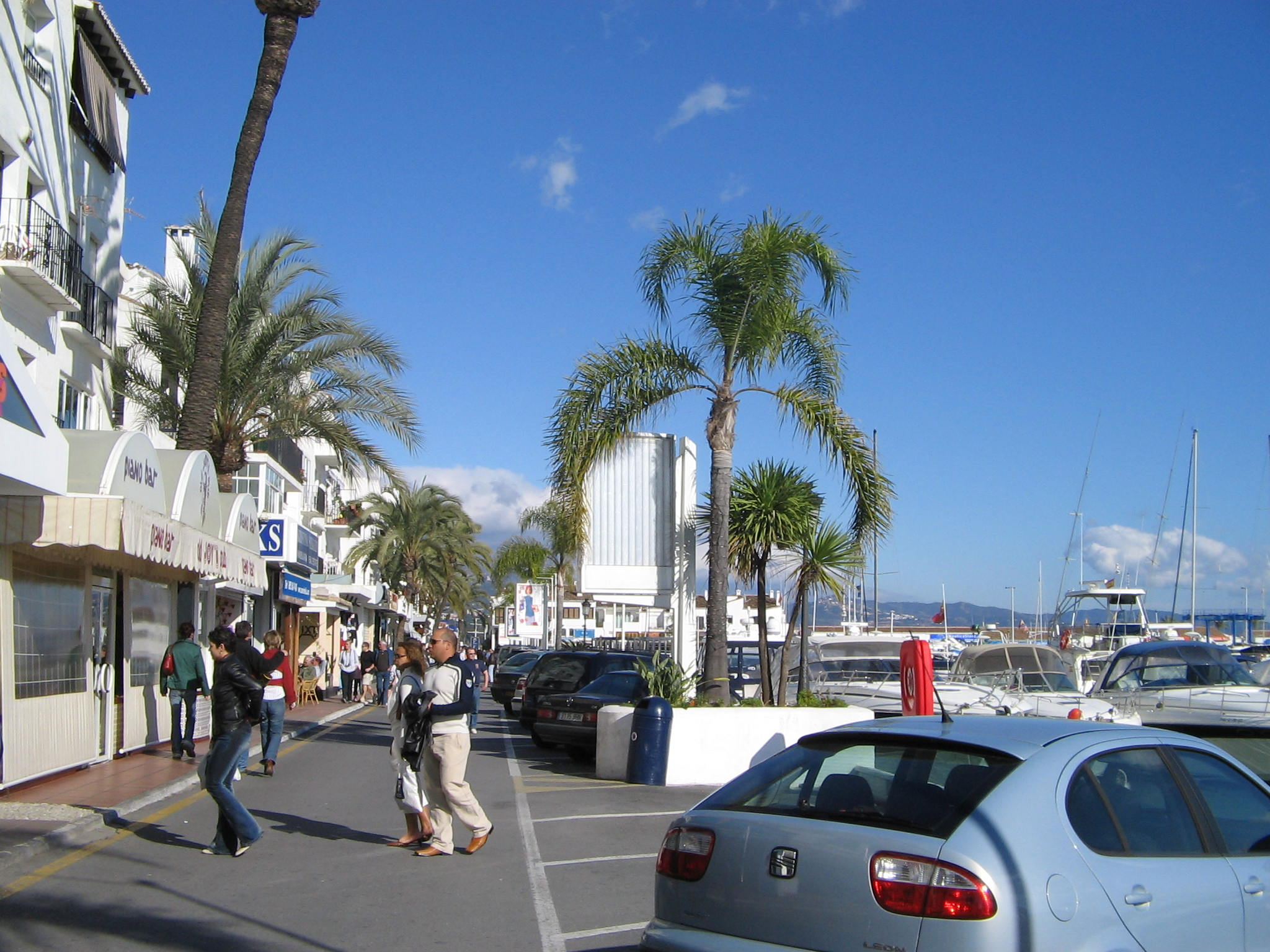

=== Transport ===
From Málaga airport, transport options include car rental, taxi, or bus. The main road A-7 also known as the Autovia del Mediterraneo on its way to Puerto Banus has the toll road or the non toll road which has views from the Costa.

=== Shopping ===
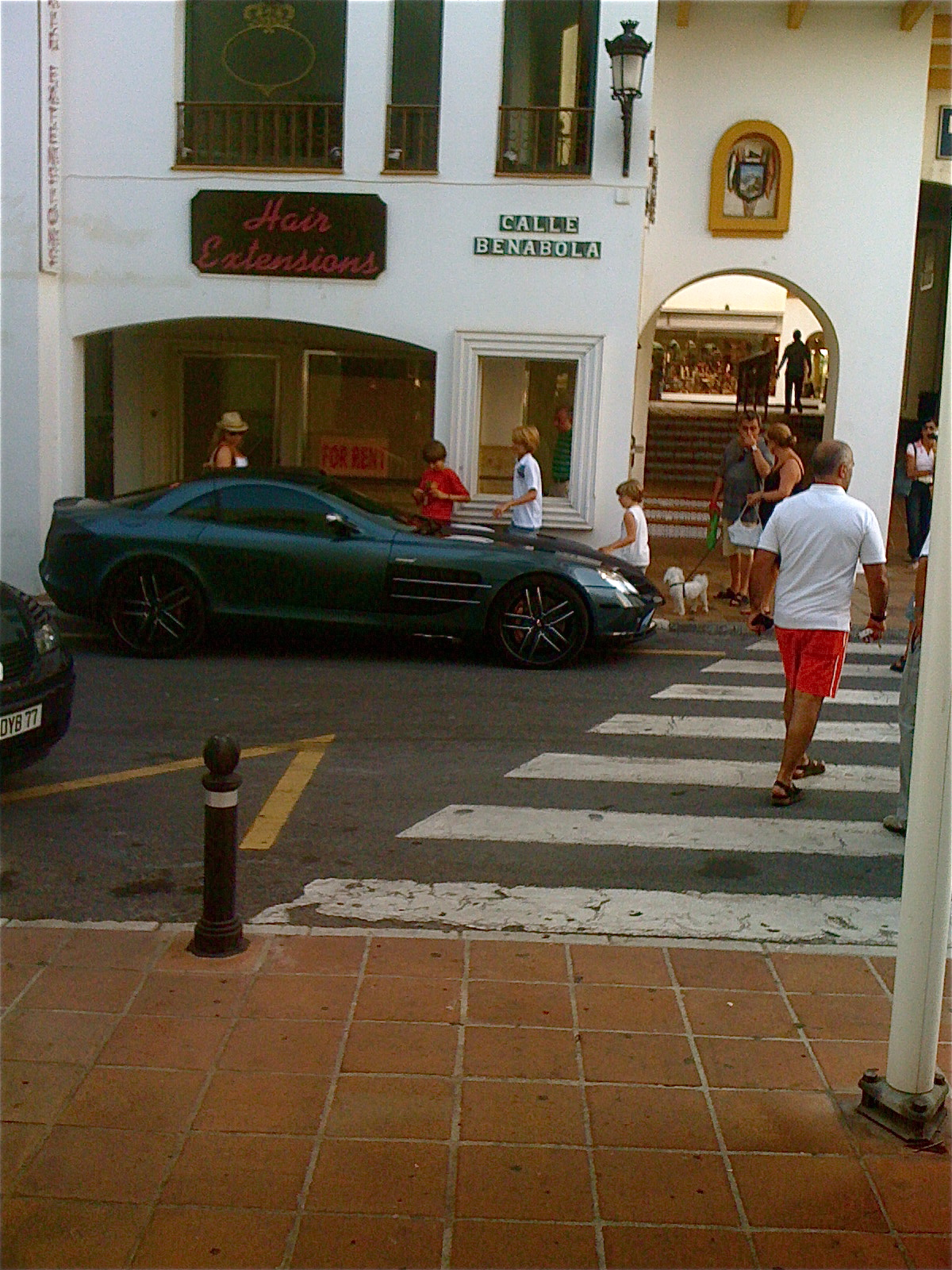
Shops

Its streets are lined with expensive luxury boutiques like Christian Dior, Gucci, Bulgari, Versace, Dolce & Gabbana, Elisabetta Franchi and others. One stretch is known as "The Golden Mile". Apart from the chain of restaurants, boutiques, in the heart of the Antonio Banderas Square is one of the largest El Corte Inglés department stores in Spain, including the up-scale hypermarket, Hipercor.

The Boulevard de la Fama de Puerto Banús was created to pay tribute to individuals who have promoted Marbella nationally or internationally through their professional work.

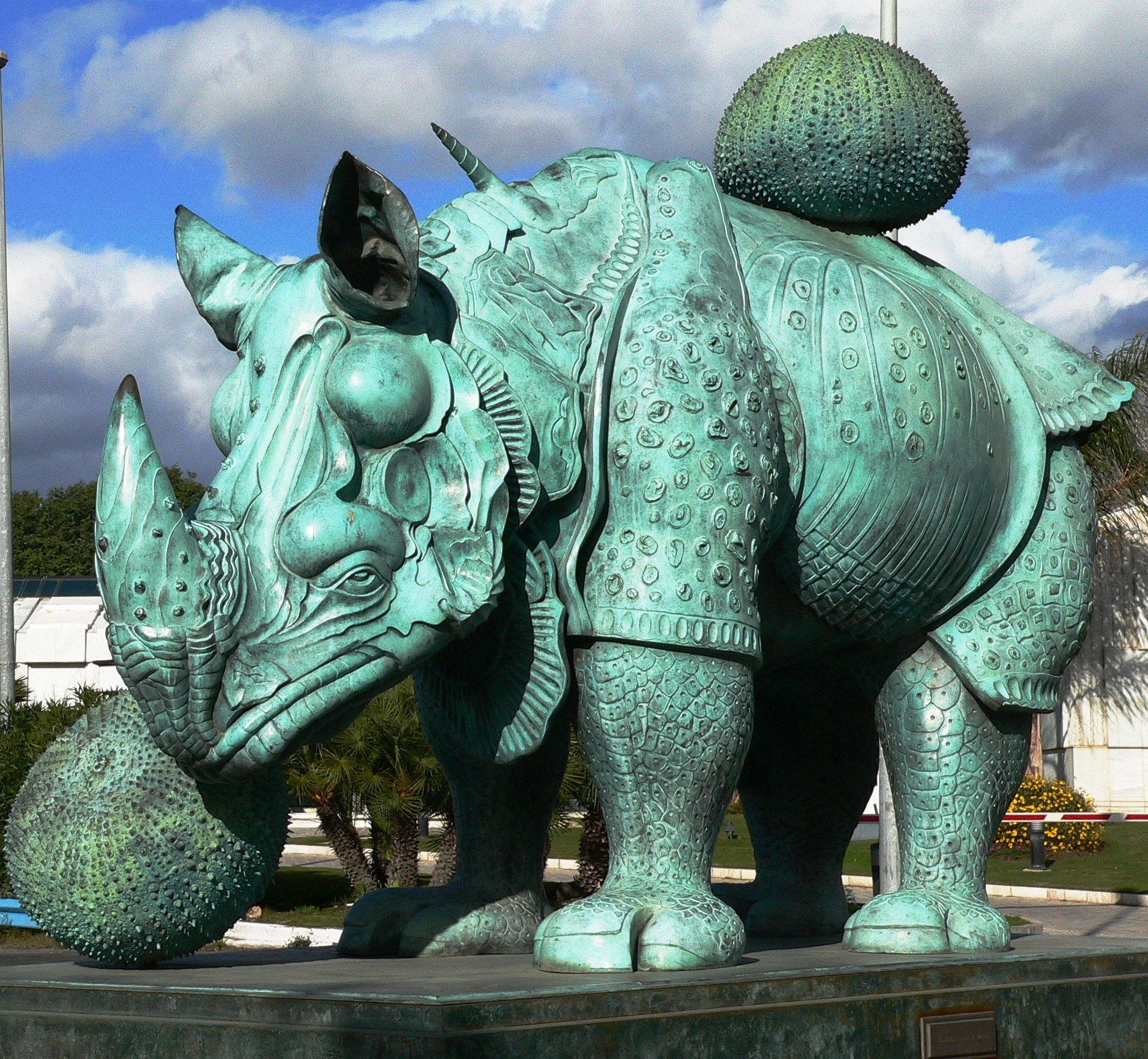
Dalí's Rhinoceros (weight 3.6 tonnes)

== Culture ==
A three-ton statue of a rhinoceros by Salvador Dalí was placed in Puerto Banús in 2004. Officially known as Rinoceronte vestido con puntillas ("Rhinoceros dressed in lace"), Dalí created the sculpture in 1956 following the filming of his surrealist movie La aventura prodigiosa de la encajera y el rinoceronte ("The prodigious adventure of the lacemaker and the rhinoceros") in 1954. Another impressive statue sculpted in bronze and copper by the Georgian sculptor Zurab Tsereteli is that of "La Victoria", which stands tall at 26 metres (85 ft) height over a granite pedestal. Unveiled in 1994, it was a gift from the Mayor of Moscow.
