= Baza =

Baza may refer to:

- Baza, Granada, a town and municipality in Granada, Spain
  - CD Baza, a football team from the city
- Baza, Perm Krai, a rural locality in Perm Krai, Russia
- Bazas or Aviceda, genus of bird of prey in the family Accipitridae (hawks)
- Belarusan-American Association (BAZA)

== See also ==
- Hoya of Baza, a valley in the northern part of the province of Granada, Andalusia, Spain
- Sierra de Baza, a mountain range near to and named after Baza, Granada
- Baza PMS-113 railway station, a railway station in Russia
