= Bauza =

Bauza or accented Bauzá, Bauzà and Bauža is a surname. Notable people with the surname in its various forms include:

- Antoine Bauza (born 1978), creator of 7 Wonders (board game)
- David Bauzá (born 1976), Spanish retired footballer
- Edgardo Bauza (born 1958), Argentine former footballer
- Eduardo Bauzá (1939–2019), Argentine politician
- Eric Bauza (1979–2026), Canadian voice actor
- Felipe Bauzá (1764–1834), Spanish naval officer, hydrographer and cartographer
- Francisco Bauzá (1849–1899), Uruguayan political figure and historian
- Guillem Bauzà (born 1984), Spanish footballer
- José Ramón Bauzà (born 1970), Spanish politician, president of the Autonomous Community of the Balearic Islands 2011–2015
- Karolis Bauža (born 1987), Lithuanian judoka from city of Jurbarkas
- Lorenzo Bauzá (1917–1971), Uruguayan chess master
- Marcelo Bauza, retired Argentine football (soccer) player
- Mario Bauzá (1911–1993), Cuban-American jazz musician
- Raúl Bauza (born 1934), Argentine modern pentathlete
- Rufino Bauzá (1791–1854), Uruguayan independence fighter and military and political figure
- Sebastián Bauzá (born 1961), Uruguayan dentist, sports leader, politician and businessman
- Walter Bauza (1939–2015), Argentine sport shooter

== See also ==
- Babuza (disambiguation)
- Baza (disambiguation)
- Buza (disambiguation)
