= Penibaetic System =

System of mountain ranges in the southern Iberian Peninsula

- Sistema Penibético
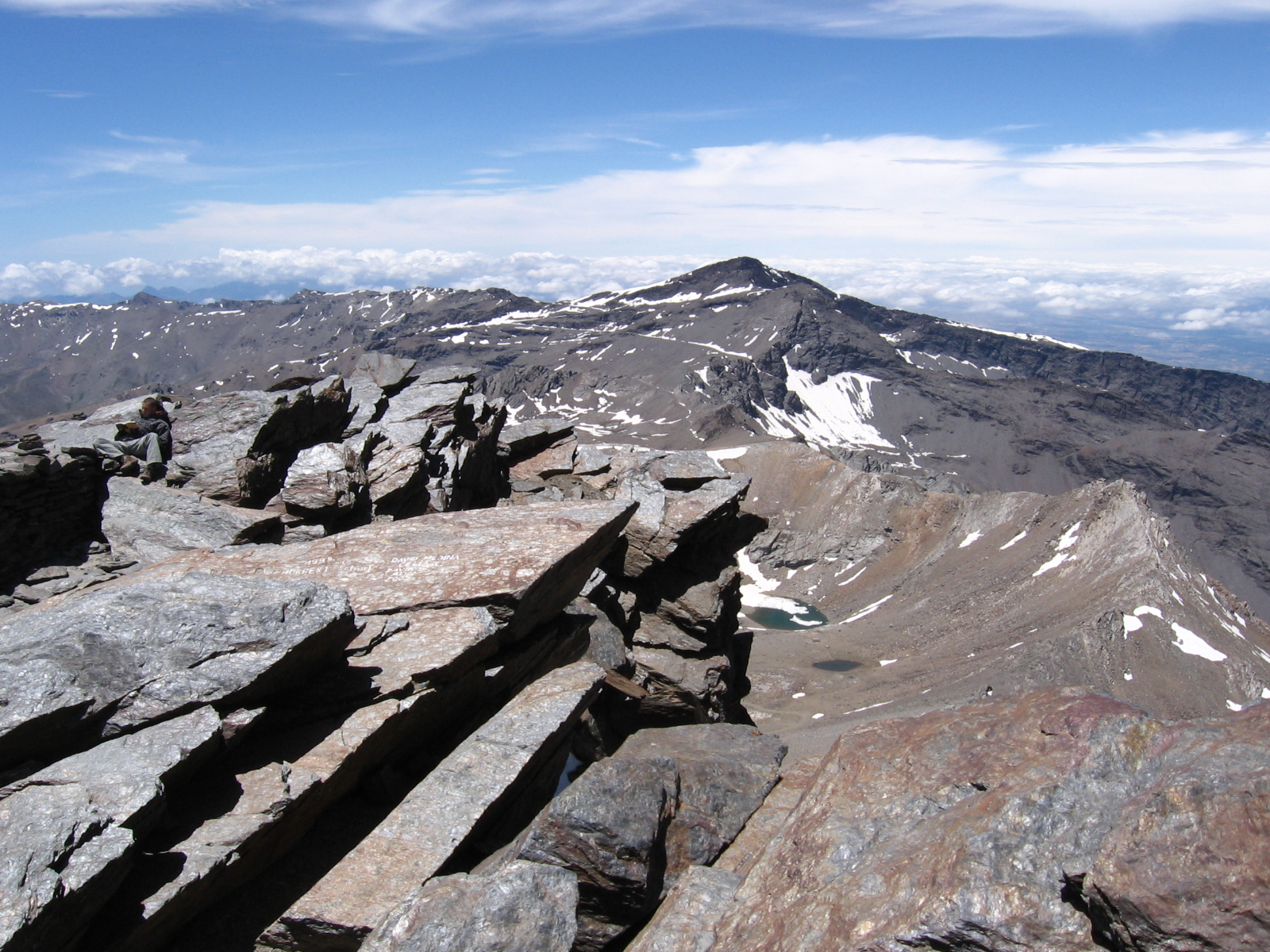
- The Veleta summit seen from the Mulhacén

Highest point
- Peak: Mulhacén
- Elevation: 3,479 m (11,414 ft)

Dimensions
- Length: 505 km (314 mi) ENE/WSW
- Width: 63 km (39 mi) NNW/SSE

Geography
- Location within Spain
- Location: Andalusia / Murcia
- Country: Spain
- Range coordinates: 37°5′0″N 3°4′0″W
- Parent range: Baetic System

Geology
- Orogeny: Alpine orogeny
- Rock age: Cenozoic
- Rock type: Limestone

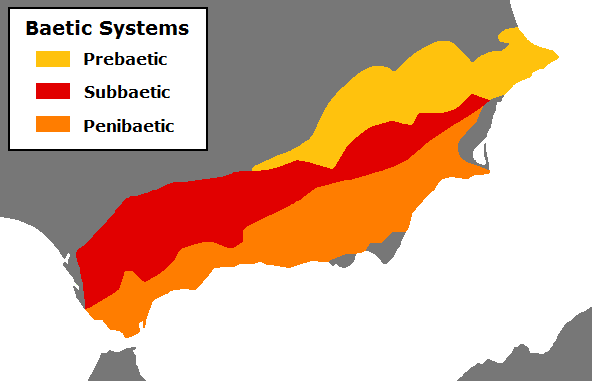
Schematic representation of the Baetic System of mountain ranges

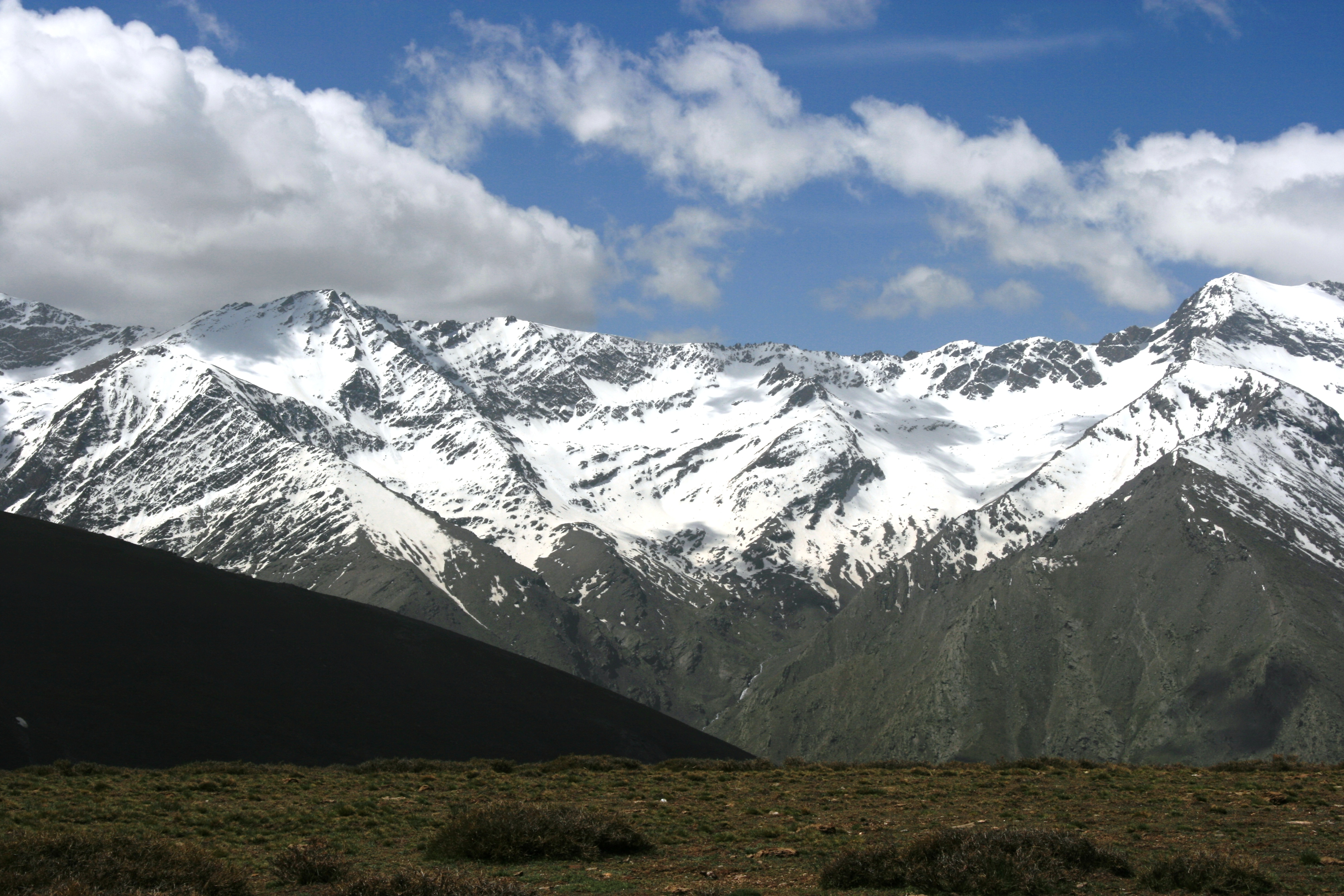
Upper Valdeinfierno river basin in Sierra Nevada

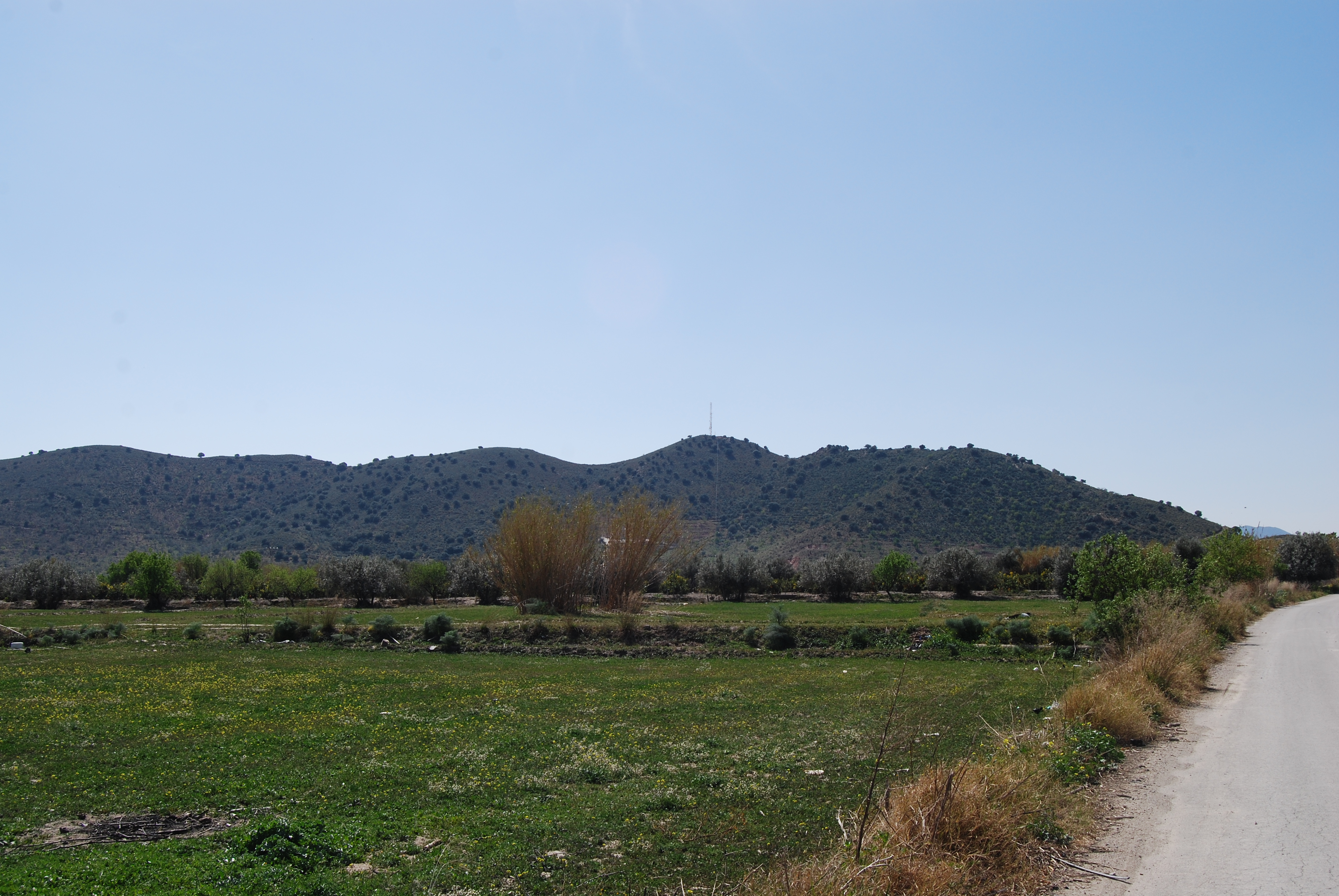
Sierra de Enmedio near Puerto Lumbreras, at the eastern end of the system

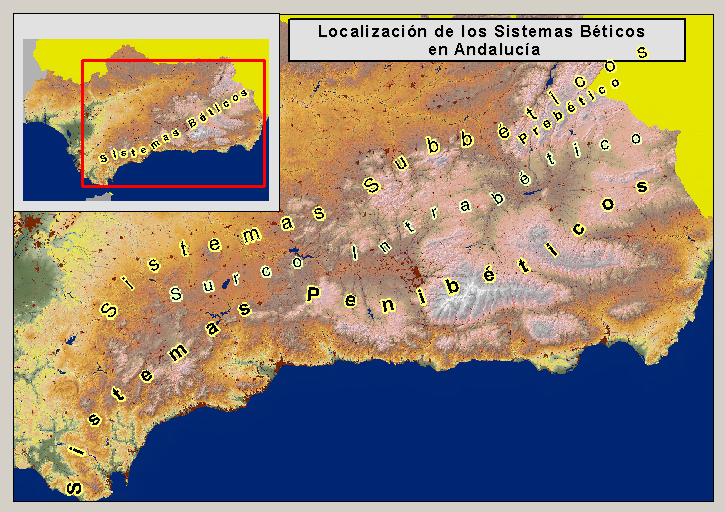
Map of the Baetic System within Andalusia

The Penibaetic System (Spanish: Sistema Penibético or Cordillera Penibética) is the southernmost of the three systems of mountain ranges of the Baetic System in the southern Iberian Peninsula. It includes the highest point in the peninsula, 3,478 m high Mulhacén in the Sierra Nevada.

== Geography ==
The Penibaetic System runs along the south coast of Andalusia, from the province of Cádiz, across the province of Granada, into the Region of Murcia until reaching the Campo de Cartagena. Along its northern side, across the intermontane basins known as the Hoya de Baza and the Hoya de Guadix, runs the Subbaetic System.

The Intrabaetic Basin (Spanish: Surco Intrabético), a discontinuous series of valleys, separates the Cordillera Penibética from the Cordillera Subbética in the north.

== Mountain ranges ==
The main mountain ranges that make up the Penibaetic complex are, from west to east, the Serranía de Ronda, the Sierra de Grazalema, the Sierra de Tejeda, Sierra de Almijara, the Sierra Nevada, the Sierra de la Contraviesa, the Sierra de Gádor, the Sierra de Baza, and the Sierra de los Filabres. The following list includes lesser ranges:

- Sierra Carbonera
- Sierra de Enmedio (Cádiz)
- Sierra de Grazalema
- Sierra de las Nieves
- Sierra Bermeja
- Rock of Gibraltar
- Sierra de Alcaparaín
- Cordillera Antequerana
  - Sierra de la Pizarra
  - Sierra del Valle de Abdalajís
  - Sierra Huma
  - Sierra Llana
  - Sierra de Chimeneas
  - Sierra de las Cabras
  - Sierra del Co, Peña Negra, 1337 m
  - Sierra Gorda
  - Sierra de San Jorge
- Peña de los Enamorados
- Sierra de Utrera
- Sierra de Cártama
- Montes de Málaga
  - Gibralfaro
- Sierra Crestellina
- Sierra Blanca
- Sierra Alpujata, Cerro Castillejos, 1,074 m
- Sierra de Mijas
- Sierra de Enmedio (Málaga)
  - Sierra de Camarolos
  - Sierra del Jobo
- Sierra de Alhama
- Sierra de Tejeda, La Maroma, 2,066 m
- Sierra de Almijara
- Sierra Nevada, Mulhacén, 3,480 m
- Sierra de la Alfaguara
- Sierra de Lújar
- Sierra de la Contraviesa
- Sierra de Gádor, Morrón de la Lagunilla, 2,249 m
- Sierra de Baza
- Cerro Jabalcón
- Sierra de los Filabres, Calar Alto, 2,168 m
- Sierra de las Estancias
- Sierra de Alhamilla, Pico Colativí, 1,387 m
- Sierra Espuña
- Sierra de Enmedio (Puerto Lumbreras)

== See also ==
- Baetic System
- Intrabaetic Basin
