= Surco Intrabético =

Discontinuous series of valleys in the Baetic System of Andalusia, Spain

Coordinates: 37°18′N 3°11′W

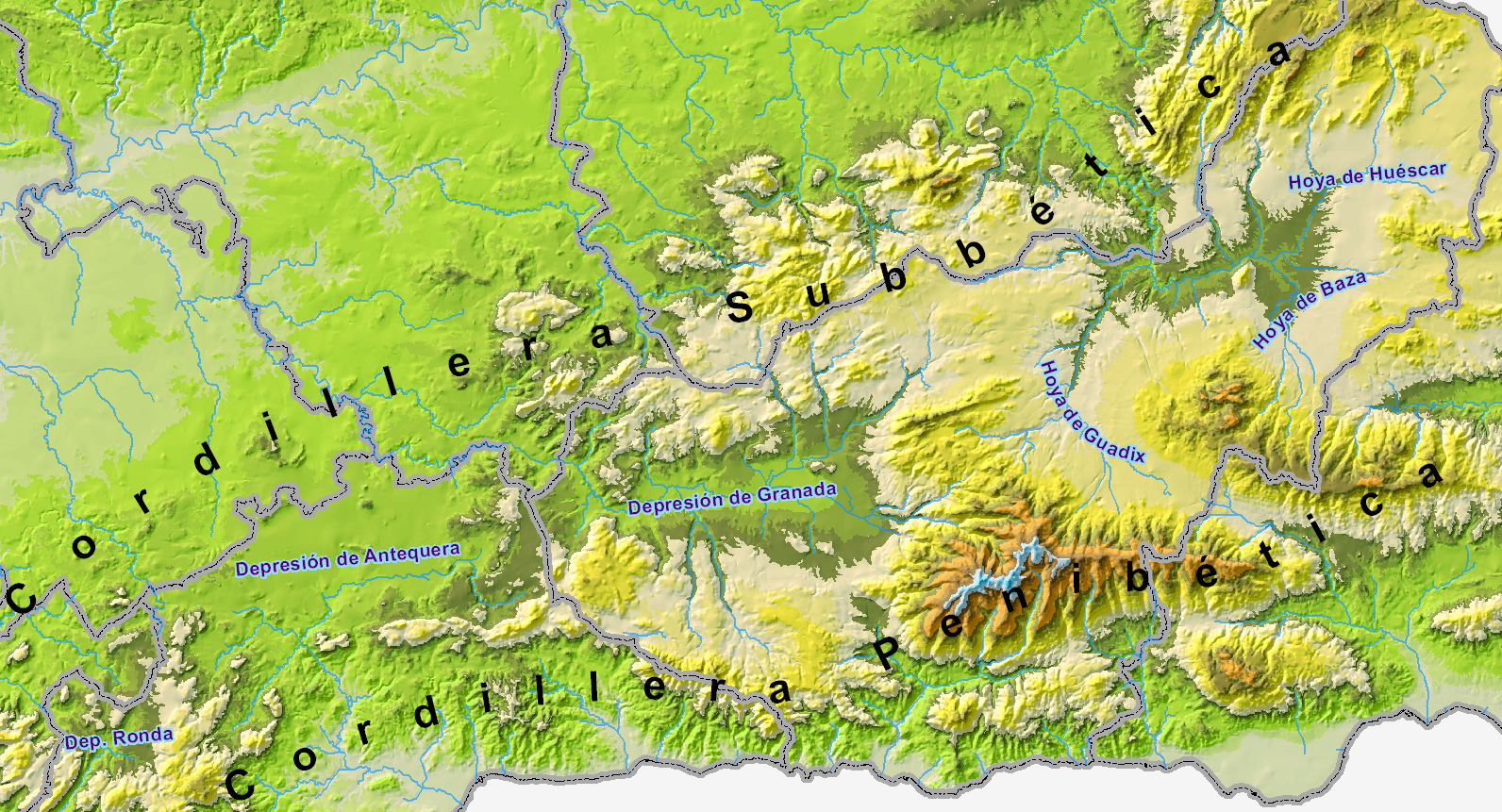
The valleys that constitute the Intrabaetic Basin.

The Intrabaetic Basin (Spanish: Surco Intrabético or Depresión Intrabética) is a discontinuous series of valleys in the Baetic System of Andalusia, Spain.

== Description ==
The Intrabaetic Basin is a series of intermontane basins that separate the Penibaetic System to its south from the Subbaetic System to the north. These basins run more or less parallel to the Mediterranean coast. Together, these valleys constitute a route from western Andalusia and the valley of the Guadalquivir to the Spanish Levante, the eastern Mediterranean coastal region of Spain. From west to east, the basins of the Depression of Ronda, the Hoya of Antequera, the Depression of Granada, the Hoya of Guadix, the Hoya of Baza, the Hoya of Huéscar, and the Hoya of Lorca.

The valleys of the Intrabaetic Basin stand in contrast to the adjacent mountain ridges that define their collective border and the rocky spurs—formed of limestone, and yielding a dry, nearly treeless landscape—that separate them from one another in that they are formed of soft materials such as clays, silts and conglomerates. Soils are deep and suitable for agriculture, but the limiting factor to human activity is the scarcity of water.

The Intrabaetic Basin formed at the end Oligocene and beginning of the Miocene, as the Baetic ranges were being formed. It is believed that at that time the entire Baetic system was surrounded by water, and the basin formed a single, continuous valley, sometimes referred to as the Baetic Depression. Later, the spurs crossing the basin were raised up, turning it into a series of separate valleys.

The valleys of the Intrabaetic Basin are quite heterogeneous, although all are sedimentary basins. The Depression of Ronda, the westernmost of the valleys, falls fully within the Cordillera Penibética. The Hoya of Antequera is intimately related to the original Baetic Depression: it was a great gulf of the sea that separated the Sierra Morena from the Andalusian ranges. The Depression of Granada is intermediate between the Penibético and Subbético. Finally the Hoyas of Guadix, Baza and Huéscar are more related to the Subbético.

The Intrabaetic Basin provides a route for the Autovía A-92 that connects Seville to Almería, passing through Antequera, Granada, and Guadix. Its branch Autovía A-92N passes through Cúllar and Baza to Puerto Lumbreras, where it meets Autovía A-7, which, in turn continues to Murcia and the Spanish Levante.

== See also ==
- Baetic System
- Geography of Spain
- Geology of the Iberian Peninsula
