= Hoya of Guadix =

Natural plain in Granada, Andalusia, Spain

- Guadix Basin
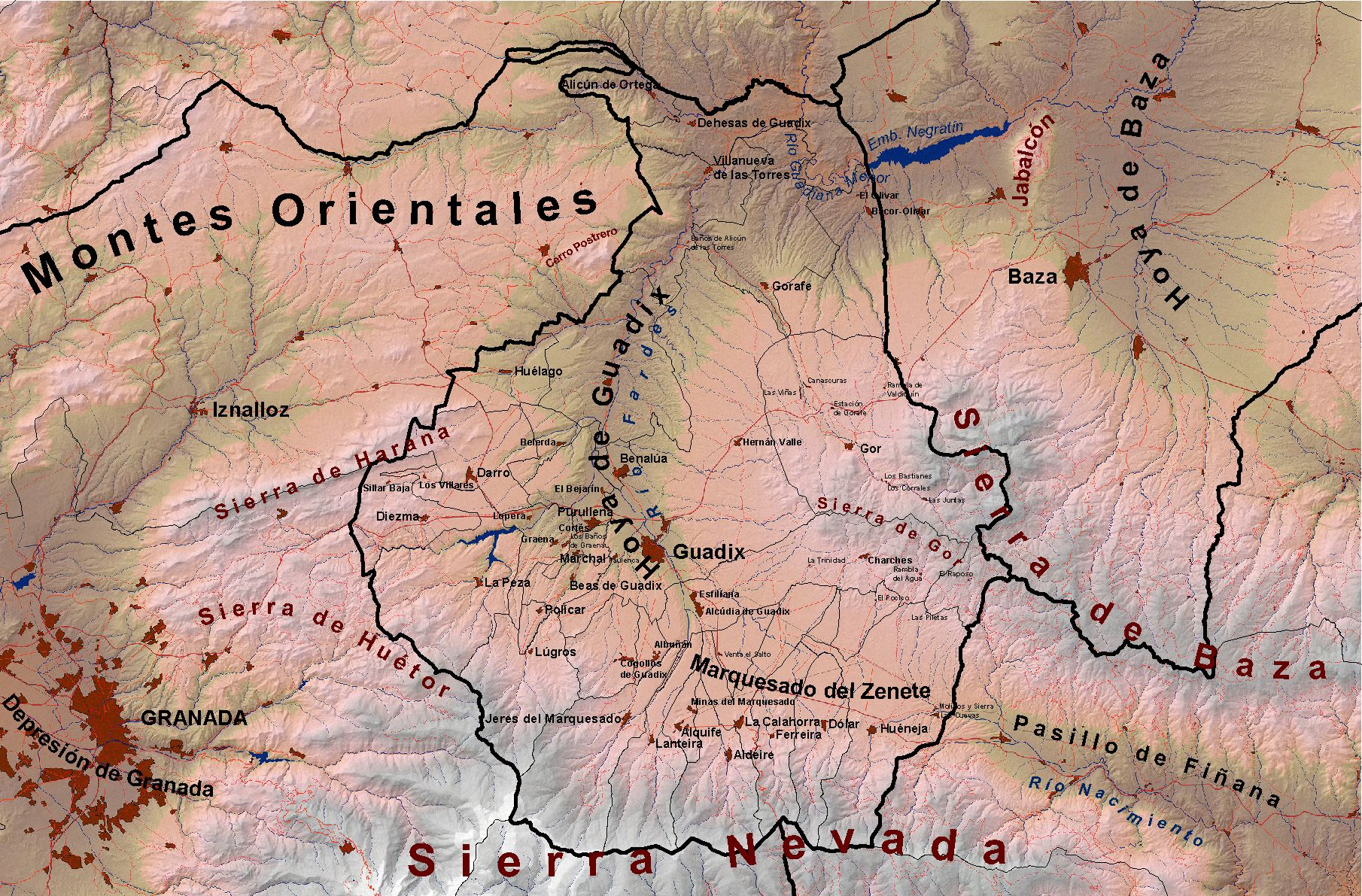

Geography
- Country: Spain
- State: Andalusia
- Region: Granada
- Population center: Guadix
- Coordinates: 37°21′N 3°11′W

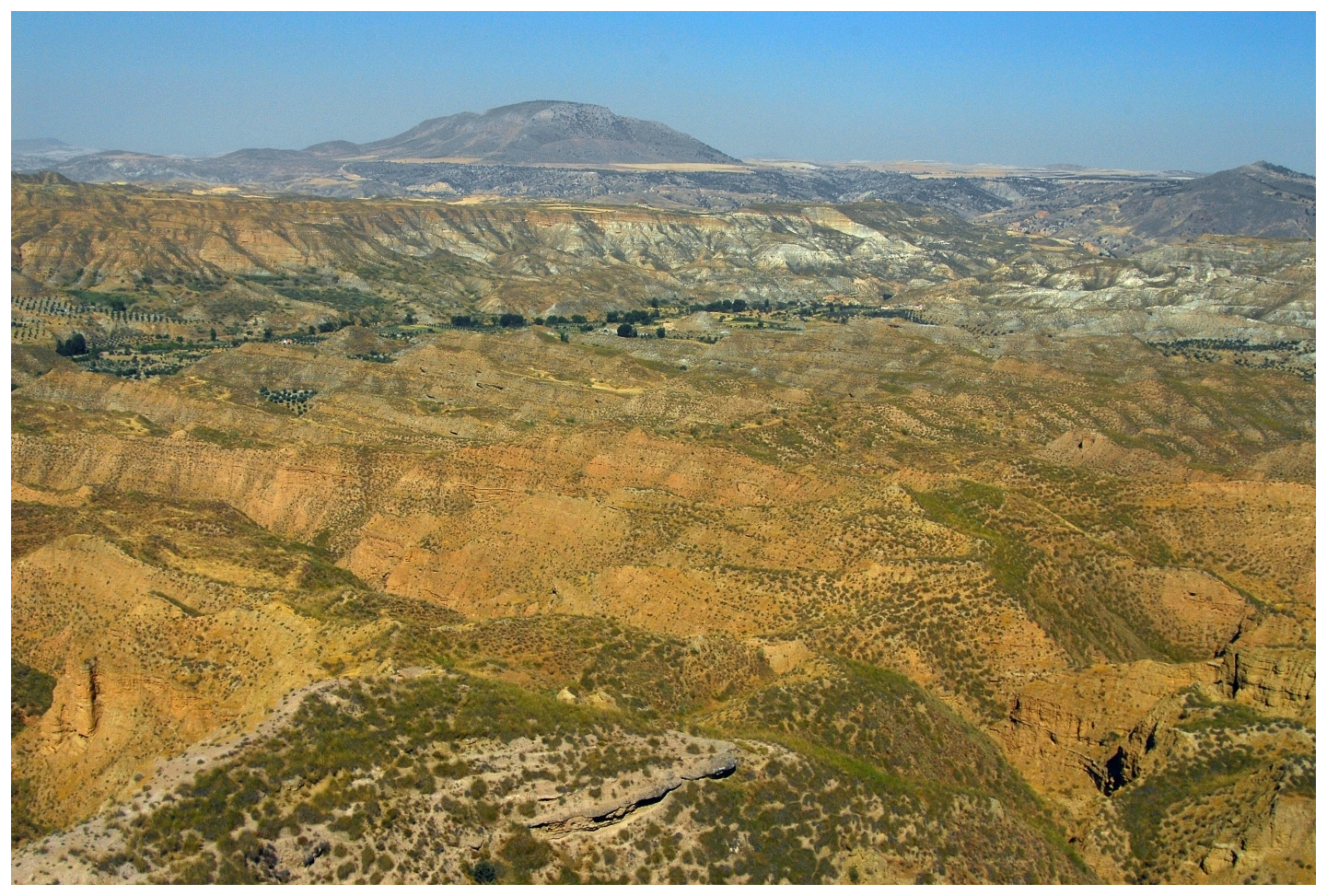
View of the Guadix Basin

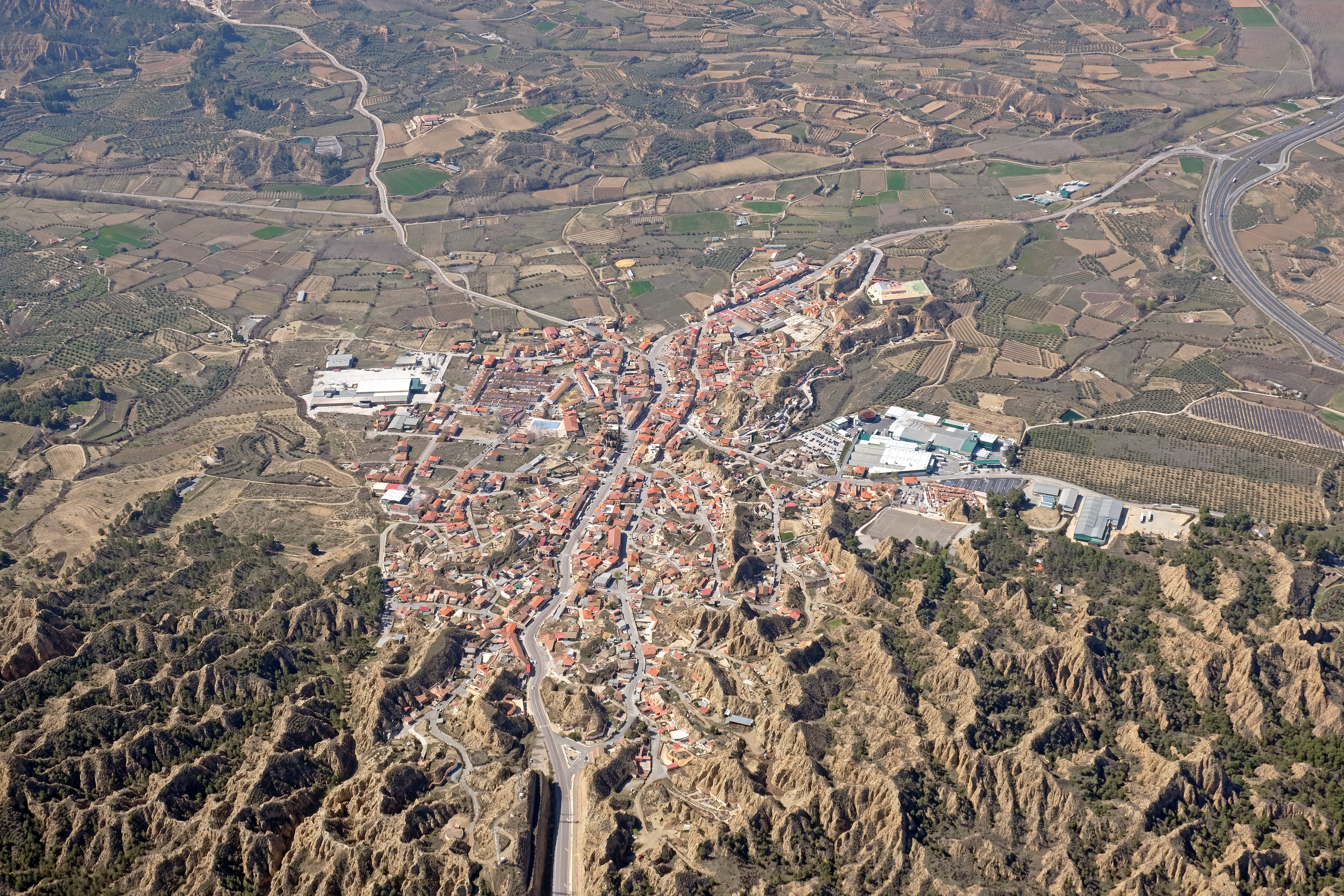
The town of Purullena, as seen from above

The Hoya of Guadix (Spanish: Hoya de Guadix) is a natural plain in the northern part of the province of Granada, Andalusia, Spain. It covers some 500 square kilometres (190 sq mi), and is formed by the basins of the rivers Fardes and Guadix. It is surrounded by the heights of the Sierra Nevada to the south, the Sierra de Baza to the east, the Sierra Mágina to the north and the Sierra Harana to the west. It is separated by the Cerro Jabalcón from the Hoya of Baza which, like the Hoya of Guadix, is one of the series of valleys forming the Surco Intrabético.

Hoya in this context refers to a low-lying plain or basin.

== Geology ==
The filling of this depression occurred simultaneously with its uplift. At its base there are bioclastic calcarenites from the Upper Miocene. These materials are typical marine deposits in areas close to the coast. Marine marl was deposited on top of these rocks. On top of them there are essentially detrital materials from continental fluvial environments (clays, silts, sands, conglomerates and rocks typical of lacustrine sedimentation in arid environments such as gypsum. The deposition of these materials indicates an uplift of the region that started with a marine sedimentation environment and ended in a continental environment. The fluvial channels gradually carried sediments from the surrounding mountain ranges that progressively clogged the basin and gave rise to a relatively flat or gently sloping bed.

There is an abundance of geological material from the Burdigalian portion of the early Miocene, some 20 million years ago. Materials of marine origin were deposited for some 7 million years, after which the basin became totally isolated from the sea. From that time, further deposits are exclusively continental, carried by flowing rivers. The current configuration of the Hoya began to take form some 500,000 years ago in a strong paleogeographic restructuring. Small rivers formed in the reliefs that surrounded the basin began a process of erosion that gave the landscape its now-characteristic gullies and badlands.

In the present day, the waters of the rivers Fardes and Guadix have made the Hoya de Guadix a fertile zone for irrigated farming, including fruit orchards (especially melons), poplar trees grown for their wood, cereals, legumes and vegetables.

== Climate ==
The climate of the basin is continental, with mountain ranges sheltering it from the influence of the sea. Precipitation falls mostly in the winter.

== Settlements ==
The largest city in the basin is Guadix, which gives it its name. Other settlements of relevance include Fonelas, Benalúa, Purullena and Alcudia de Guadix.
