= Sierra Alpujata =

Mountain range in Málaga, Spain

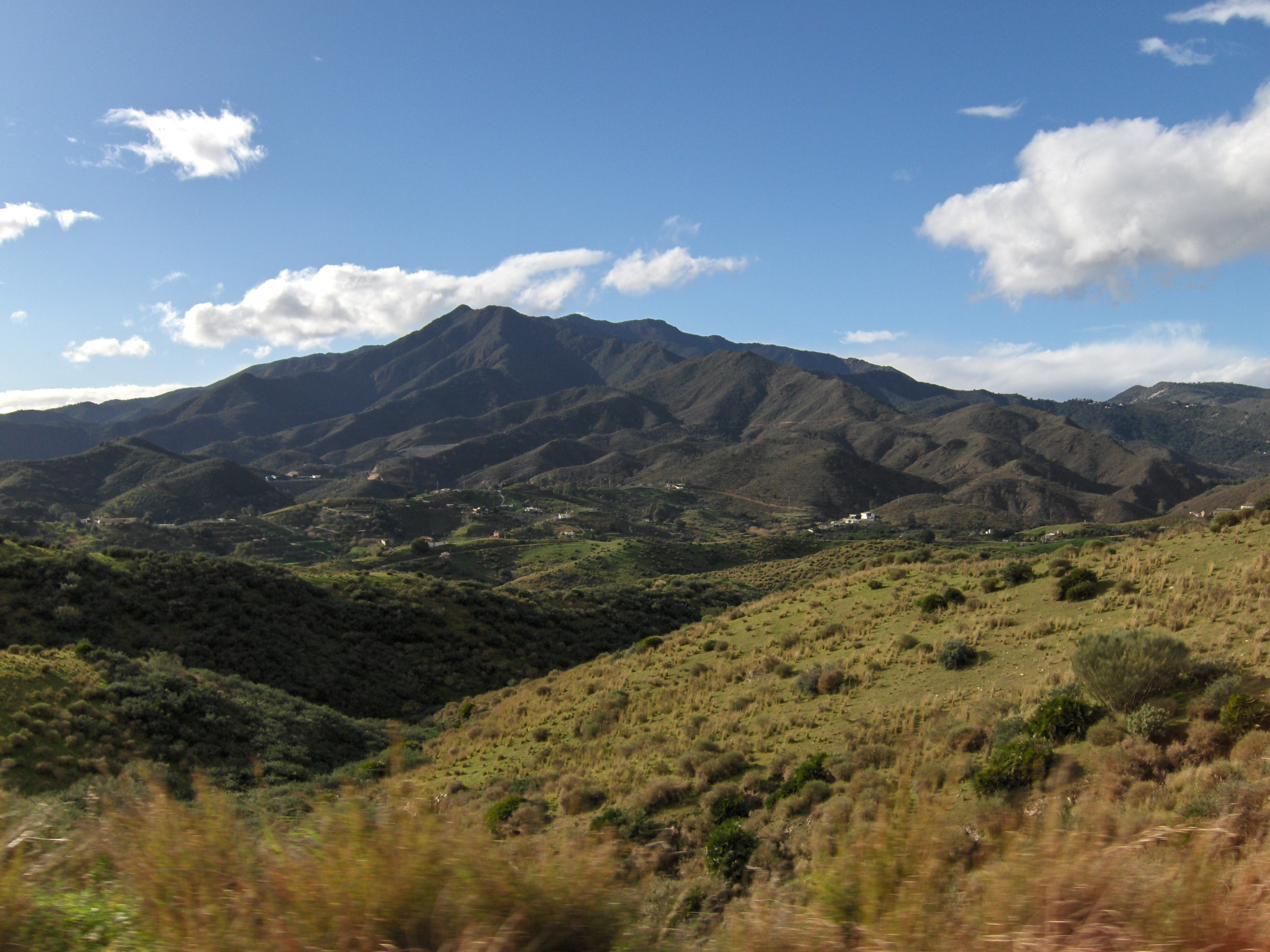
- View of Sierra Alpujata

Highest point
- Elevation: 1,074 m (3,524 ft)
- Coordinates: 36°36′0″N 04°47′30″W

Geography
- Location within Spain
- Location: Málaga Province, Spain
- Parent range: Penibaetic System

Geology
- Mountain type: Peridotite

Climbing
- Easiest route: From Monda, Coín, Mijas or Ojén

The Sierra Alpujata is a mountain range in southern Spain, part of the coastal mountain range that lies behind the Costa del Sol Occidental, in Andalusia. It is situated between the Sierra Blanca and the Sierra de Mijas.

== Geography and geology ==
The highest point is the Cerro Castillejos, at 1,074 metres. Geologically it is located in the Penibaetic System. Due to its mineral constitution, vegetation is very sparse, despite several attempts at restocking pines and eucalyptus trees. The predominant vegetation consists of juniper and shrubland.

Geologically the range is the relic of an ancient submarine stratovolcano, which formed at the same time than the Sierra Blanca and the Sierra de Mijas. The large crater is recognizable from aerial photos. It is predominantly made of peridotite.

== Sources ==
- Pérez, Eduardo (2005). Conocer la Sierra de Mijas. Juan Morente.
