= Costa del Sol Occidental =

Coordinates: 36°30′54″N 4°52′40″W

- Comarca
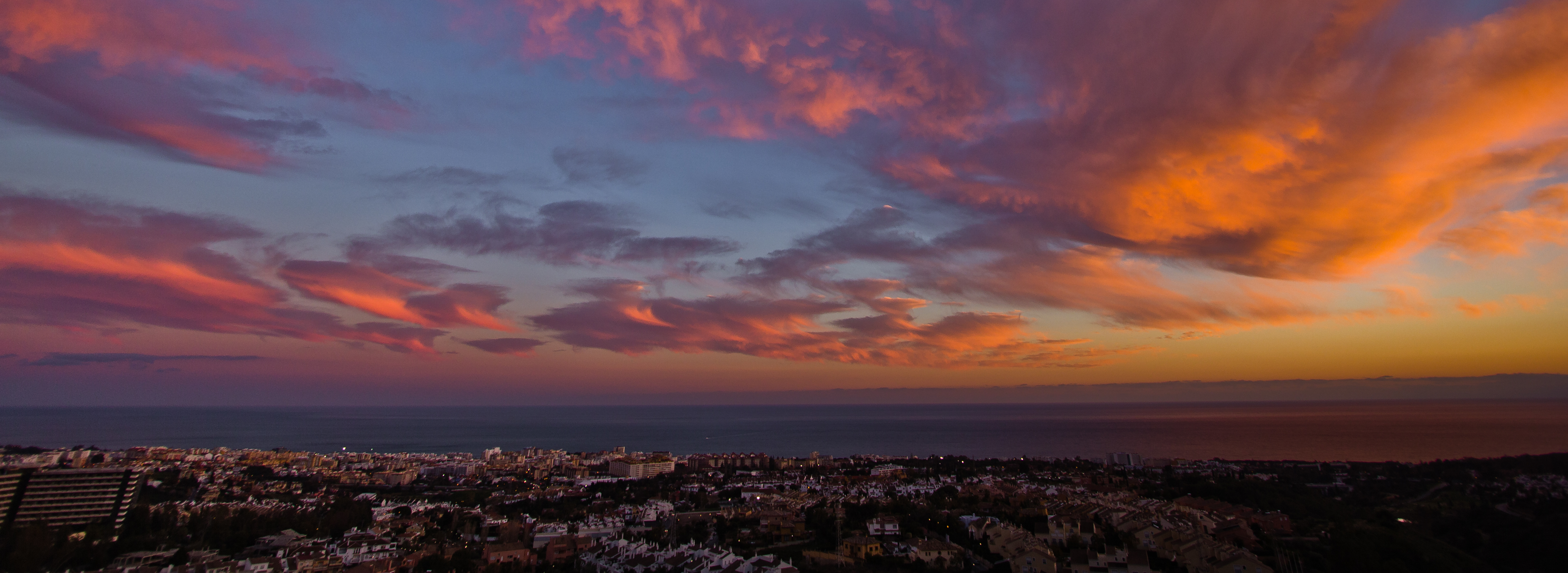
- Sunset in Marbella

- Location of Costa del Sol Occidental in Andalusia, Spain

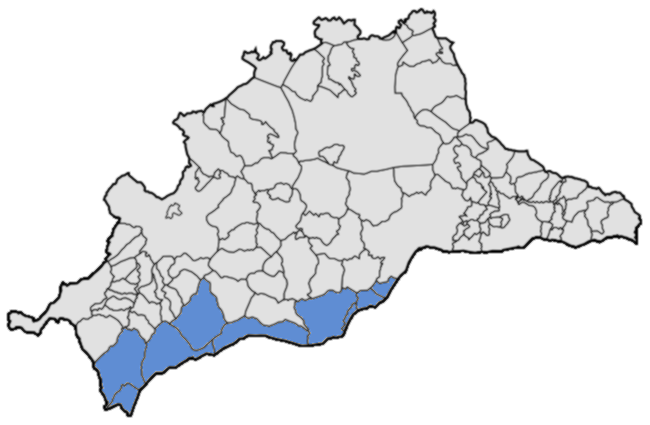
- Location of Costa del Sol Occidental in the province of Málaga
- Country: Spain
- Autonomous community: Andalusia
- Province: Málaga
- Capital: Marbella
- Municipalities: List: Benahavís, Benalmádena, Casares, Estepona, Fuengirola, Manilva, Marbella, Mijas, Torremolinos

Area
  - Total: 802.7 km^{2} (309.9 sq mi)

Population (2023) (Note: Estimate at 1 January 2023: National Statistics Institute (Spain))
  - Total: 592,006
  - Density: 737.5/km^{2} (1,910/sq mi)
- Time zone: UTC+1 (CET)
  - Summer (DST): UTC+2 (CEST)

Costa del Sol Occidental (English: "Western Coast of the Sun") is one of the nine comarcas (county) in the province of Málaga, Andalusia, southern Spain. This comarca was established in 2003 by the Government of Andalusia.

It occupies a narrow coastal strip delimited by the cordillera Penibética (Sierra de Mijas, Sierra Alpujata, Sierra Blanca, Sierra Bermeja, Sierra Crestallina) to the north and the Mediterranean Sea to the south. The coast shows a diversity of landscapes: beaches, cliffs, estuaries, bays and dunes. The rivers are short and seasonal, while the agriculture is hampered by the lee effect caused by the Baetic System.

== Municipalities ==
There are 9 municipalities, running along this coast, and listed below from west to east:

Arms	Municipality	Area (km²)	Population (2023) (Note: Estimate at 1 January 2023: National Statistics Institute (Spain))	Density (/km^{2})
	Benahavís	145.4	9,244	63.6
	Benalmádena	26.9	75,801	2,817.88
	Casares	162.4	8,111	49.9
	Estepona	137.5	76,975	559.8
	Fuengirola	10.4	85,598	8,230.6
	Manilva	35.6	17,857	501.6
	Marbella	116.8	156,295	1,338.1
	Mijas	148.8	91,691	616.2
	Torremolinos	19.9	70,434	3,539.4
	Totals	802.7	592,006	737.5

== Gallery ==
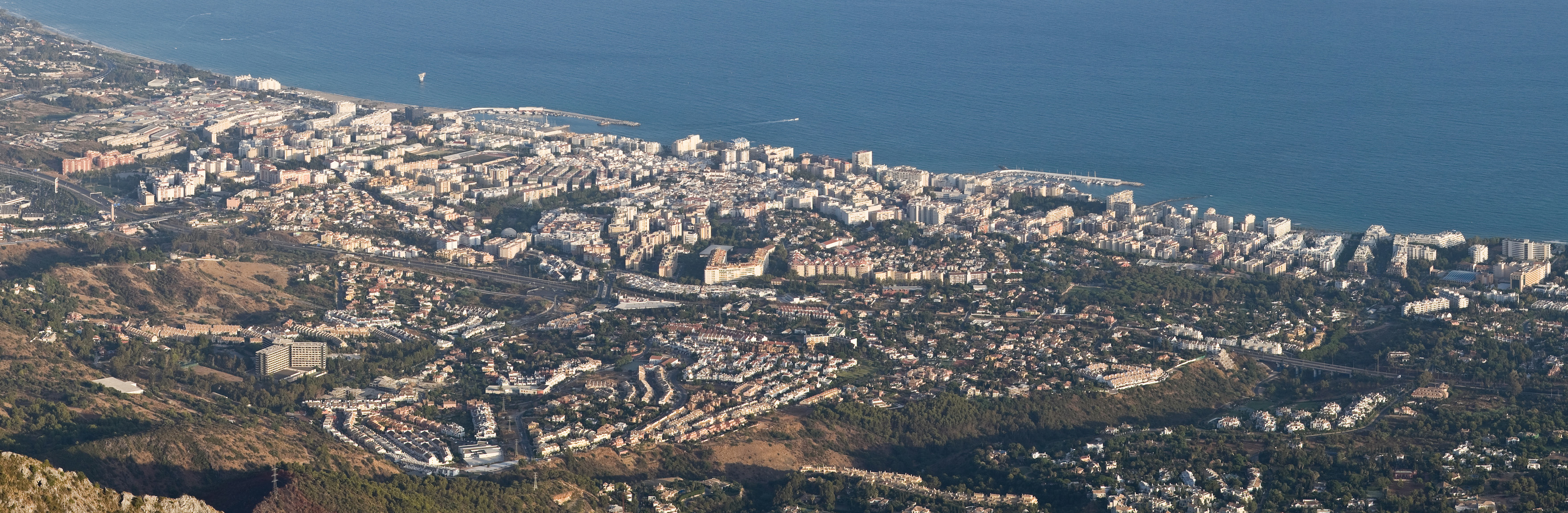
View of Marbella

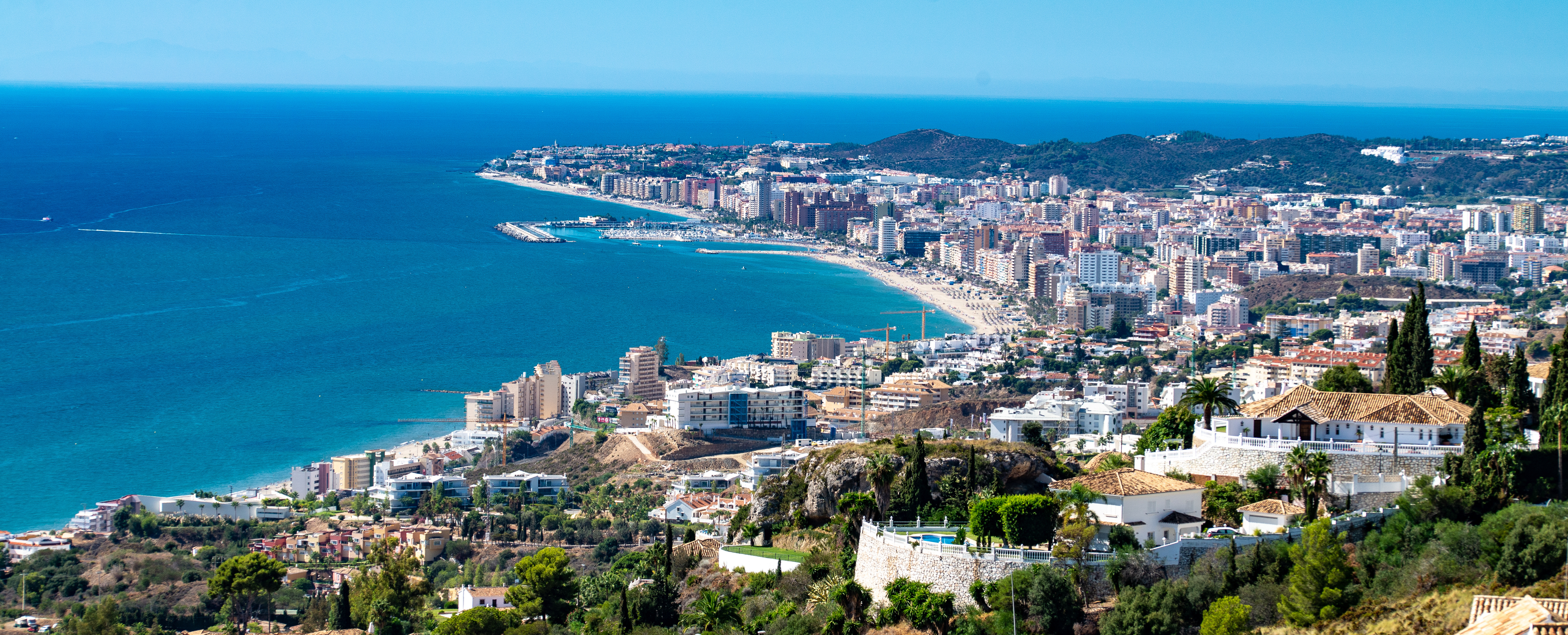
Fuengirola

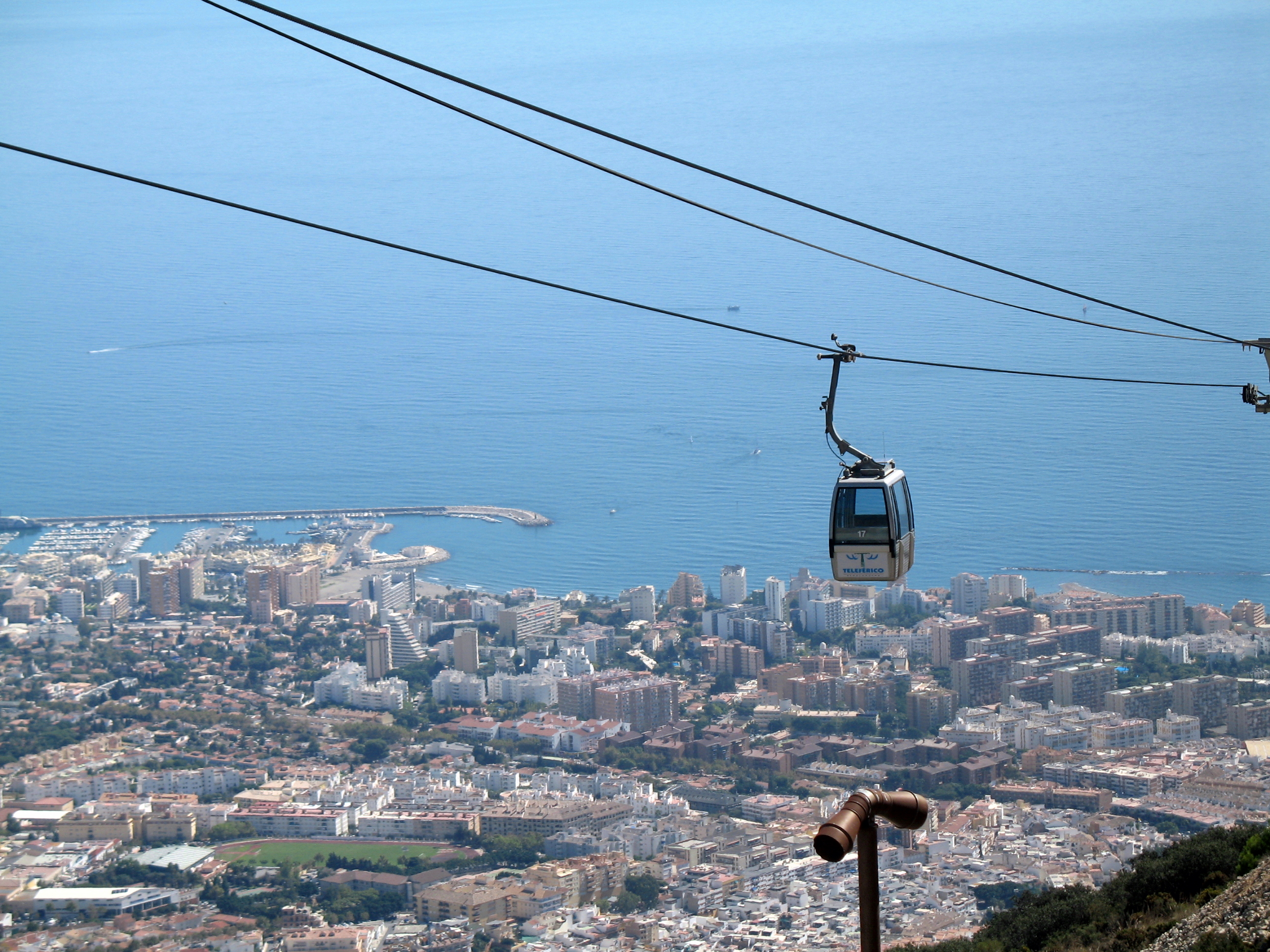
Benalmádena

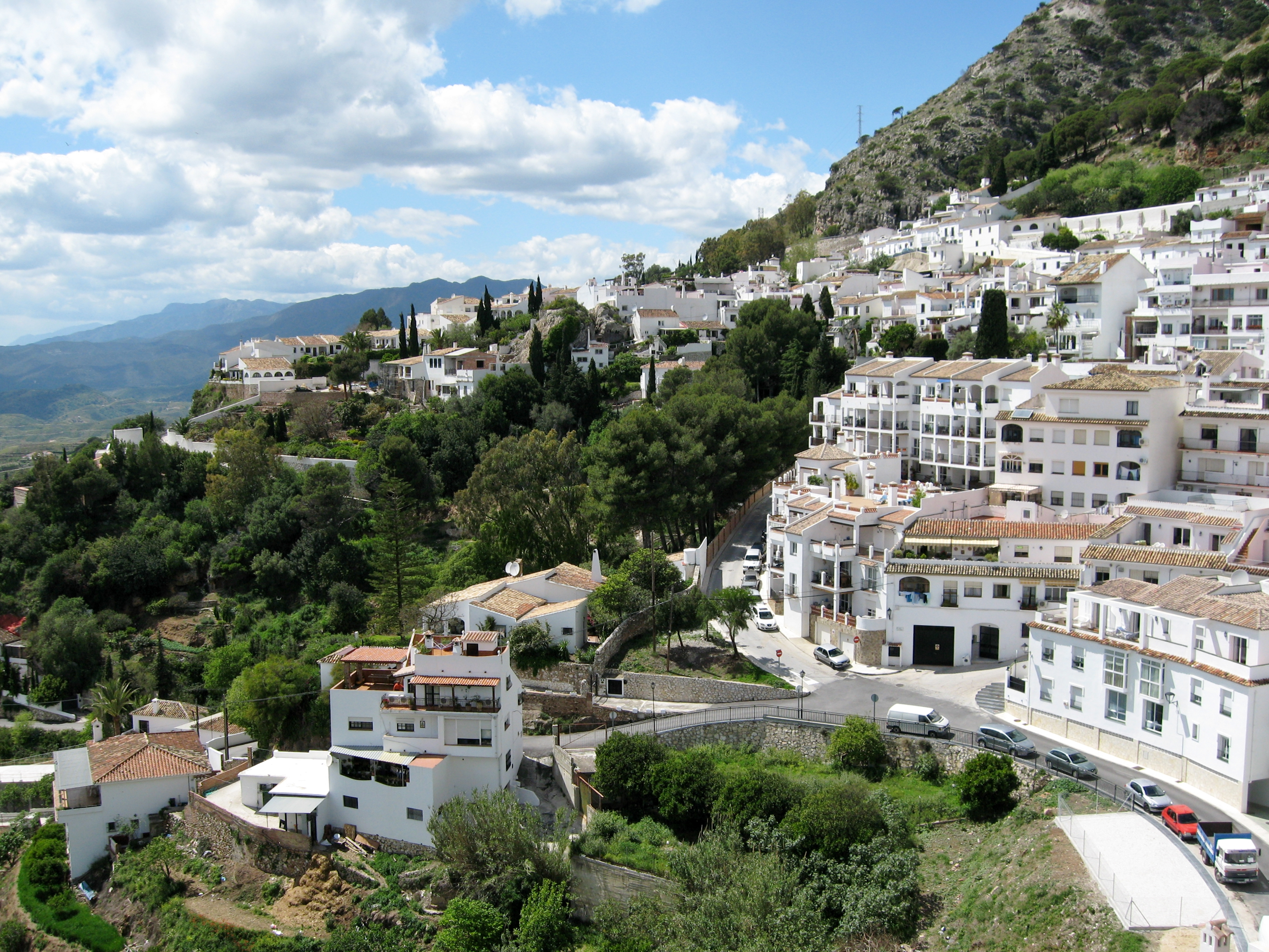
Mijas

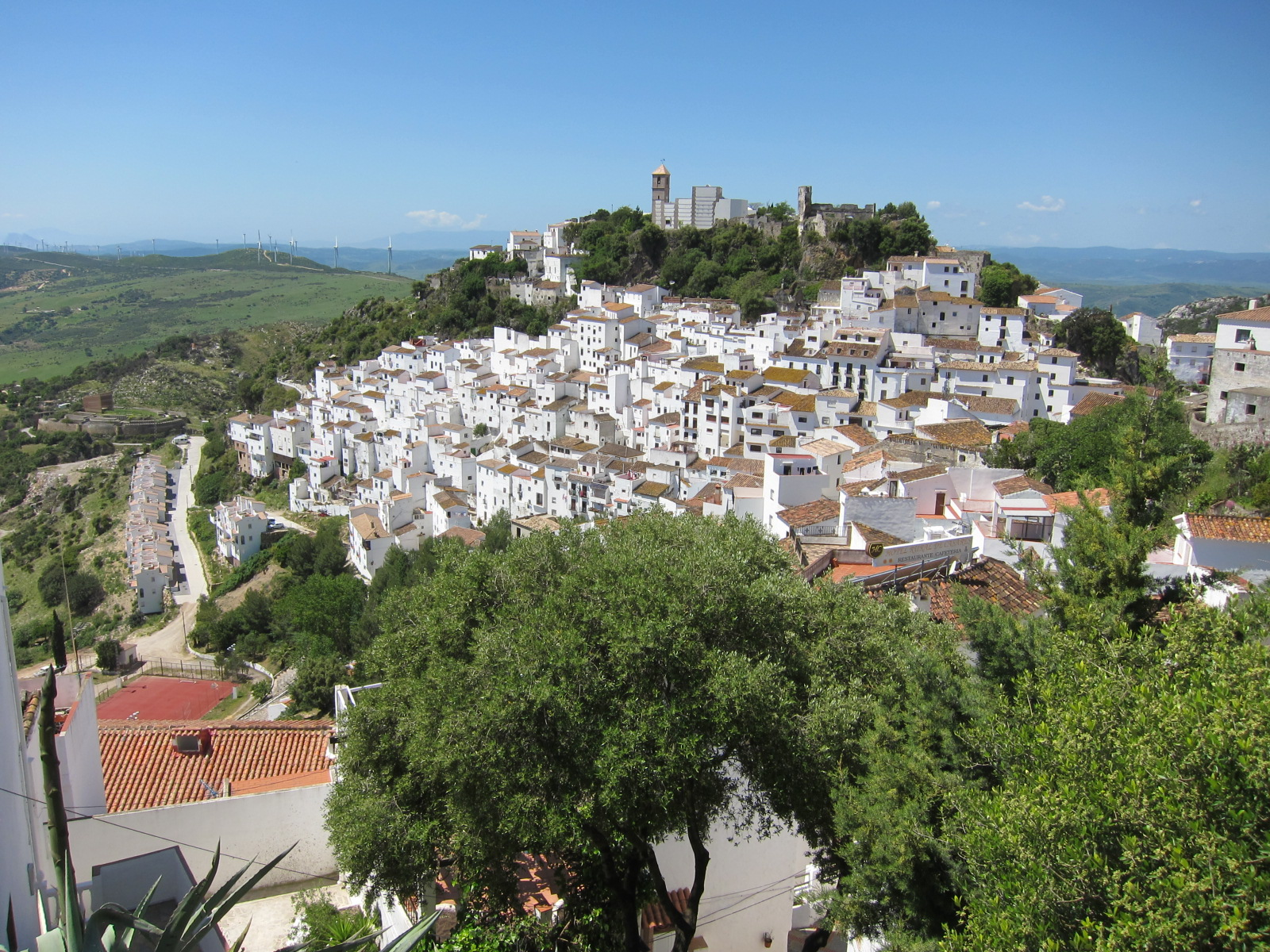
Casares

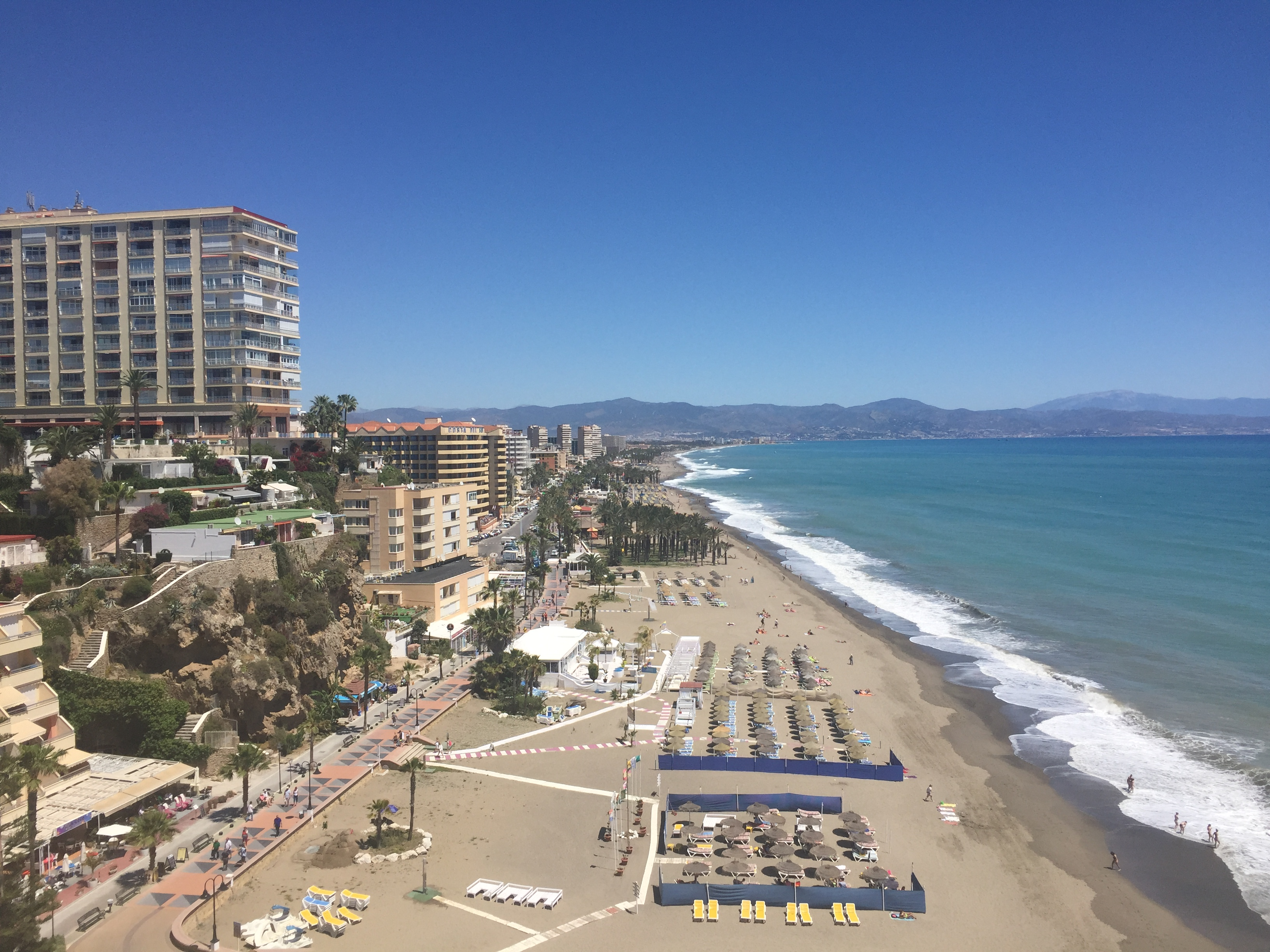
Torremolinos beach

== See also ==
- Baetic System
- Costa del Sol
