= Casares, Málaga =

Casares
- Municipality
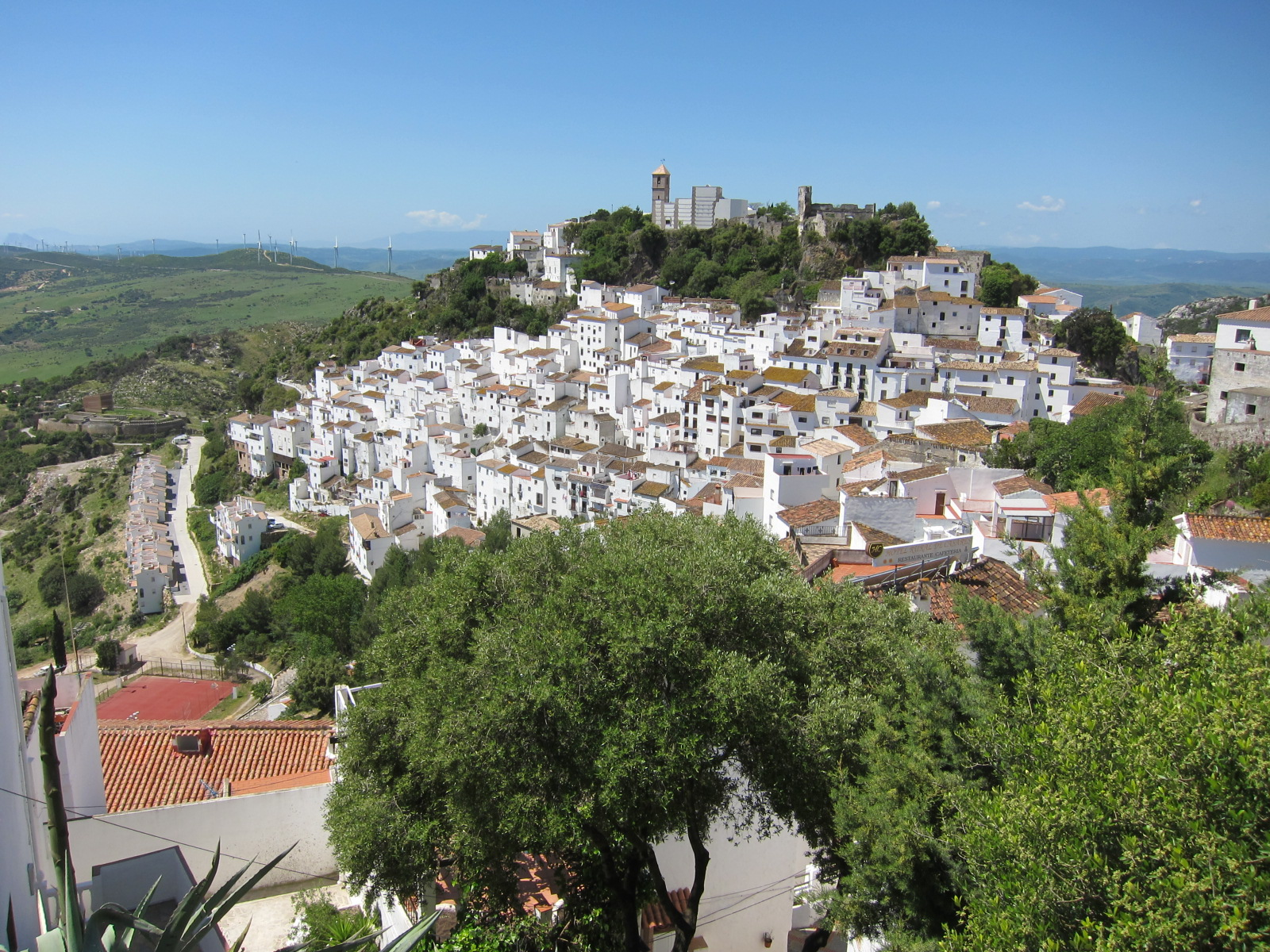

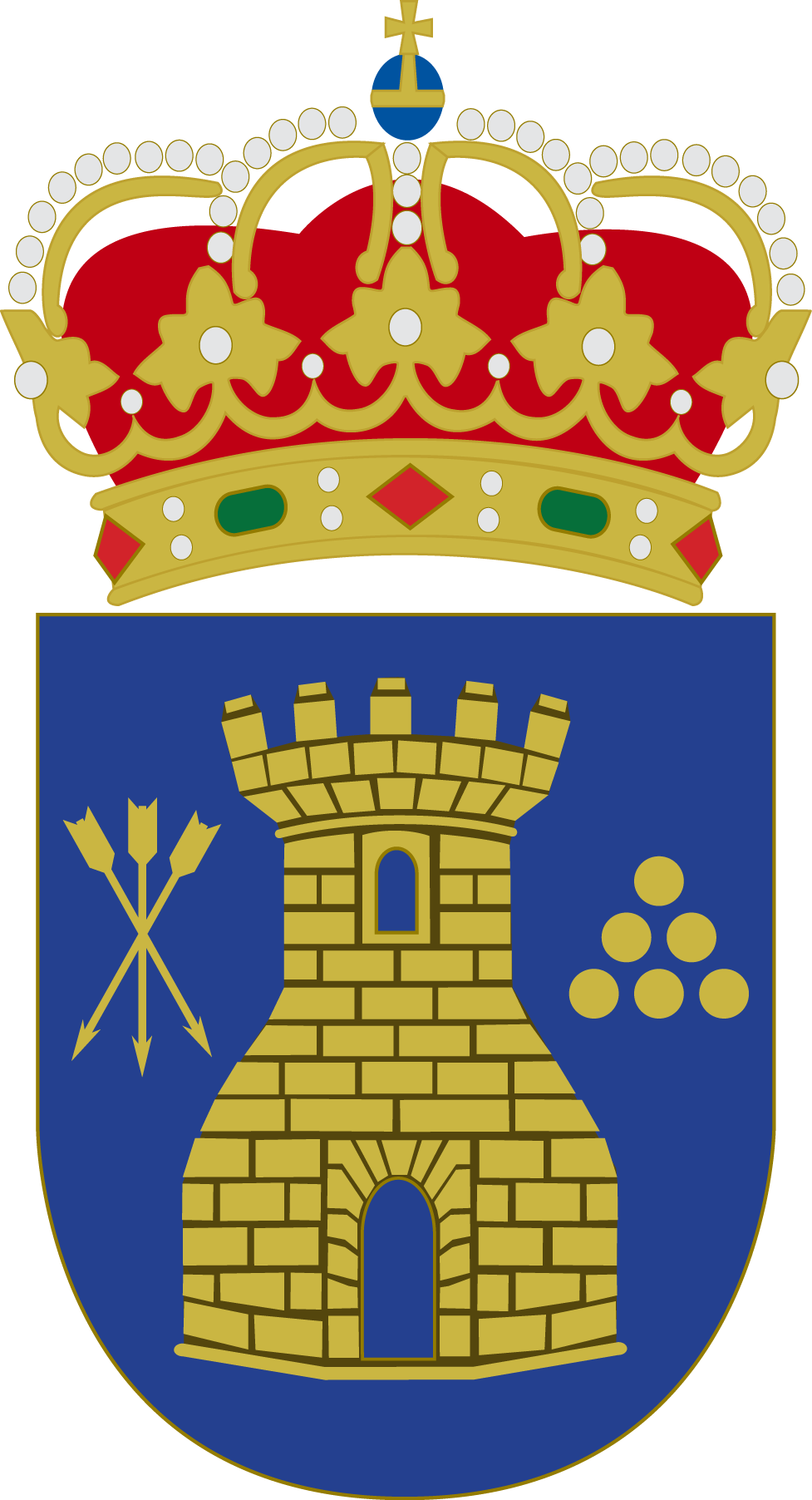
- Coat of arms

- Location in Province of Málaga Location in Spain Location in Andalusia
- Coordinates: 36°26′40″N 5°16′22″W
- Sovereign state: Spain
- Autonomous community: Andalusia
- Province: Málaga
- Comarca: Costa del Sol Occidental

Government
  - Alcalde: José Carrasco Martínez (IULV–CA)

Area
  - Total: 160 km^{2} (62 sq mi)
  - Land: 160 km^{2} (62 sq mi)
  - Water: 0.00 km^{2} (0 sq mi)

Population (2025-01-01)
  - Total: 9,009
  - Density: 56/km^{2} (150/sq mi)
- Time zone: UTC+1 (CET)
  - Summer (DST): UTC+2 (CEST)
- Website: casares.es

Casares is a town and municipality in Spain, located in Málaga province, in the autonomous community of Andalusia.

== Geography and demography ==
The municipality has a population of 4,051 (male: 2,139, female: 1,912) and an area of 160 km^{2}. It has a density of 25.3/km^{2}.

The municipality borders Estepona, Manilva, and Gaucín.

The town of Casares has Moorish cliff-hugging buildings.

== History ==
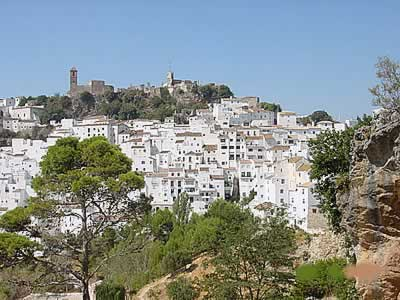
View over Casares

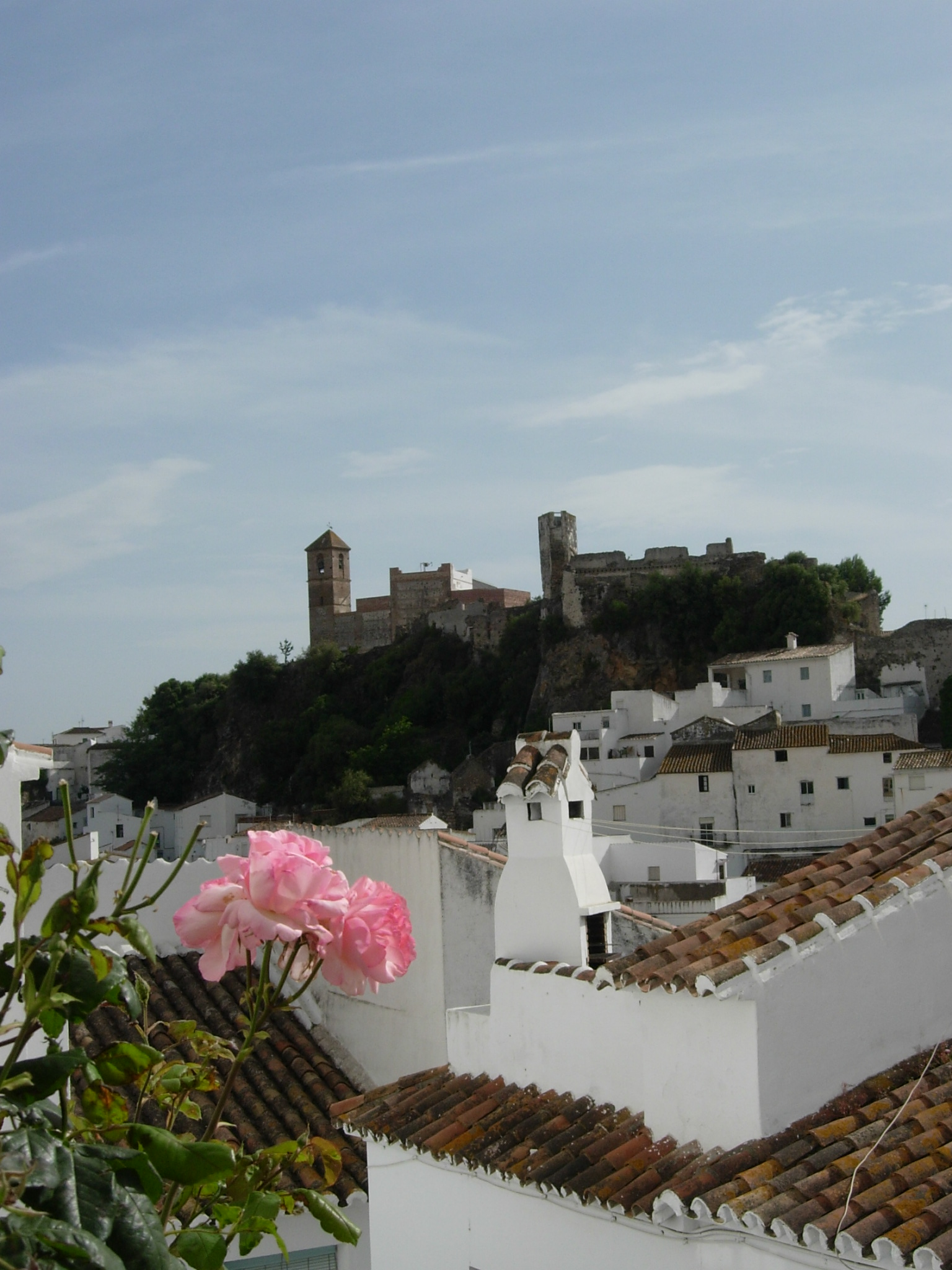
View of Casares

According to a legend, it was Julius Caesar who founded Casares, after he cured his skin condition by bathing in the sulphurous and alkaline-magnetic waters of the thermal baths of "La Hedionda". For this reason, during the Roman Empire, Casares was allowed by emperors to mint its own coins.

The 12th-century castle, around which grew the present town center, was founded by the occupying Moors. In 1361, Peter I of Castile and the dethroned Muhammed V signed the Pact of Casares, by which the Moorish King recuperated his throne, leaving Casares as part of the Nasrid dynasty. The town surrendered to the Catholic forces after the fall of Ronda in 1485 and was handed over to Rodrigo Ponce de León, Duke of Cádiz. Later during the Rebellion of the Moriscos, Rodrigo's descendant, the Duke of Arcos, accepted the surrender of the rebel Moriscos, the Moors who had "converted" to Christianity. Casares had taken an active part in the Morisco rebellion, put down by Don John of Austria. The town separated from Manilva in 1795, being granted the title of Villa. At a later period, Casares was the only town, apart from Cádiz, that the Napoleonic troops had not been able to take.

More recent history indicates the old village as the birthplace of the father of Andalusian nationalism, Blas Infante Pérez de Vargas, labor lawyer, politician and writer, who is considered to be the largest historic figure in Andalusia. He was born in 1885 and died during the civil struggle in 1936.

Since 1978 the historical and artistic heritage of the village has been officially protected.

== Celebrations ==
The main fair (Feria) of Casares takes place during the first weekend in August. The day of the patron saint, the Virgen del Rosario, is celebrated in the first week in September, and in the middle of this month too is the Feria del Cristo. The most important of the Romero takes place the last Saturday in May.

== Local administration ==
The mayor of Casares is José Carrasco Martínez, of Izquierda Unida–Los Verdes–Convocatoria por Andalucía. This coalition has seven councillors in the town's ayuntamiento, while the Spanish Socialist Workers' Party have two and People's Party another two.

== Elections ==
In the 2016 Spanish General Election, the Spanish Socialist Workers' Party got 31% of the vote in Casares, closely challenged by coalition of Podemos, Izquierda Unida and Equo with 27.43% and by the Partido Popular with 24.65%.

== Notable natives ==
- Blas Infante

== See also ==
- List of municipalities in Málaga
