= Baza Cathedral =

Church in Baza, Spain

Coordinates: 37.49038°N 2.77473°W

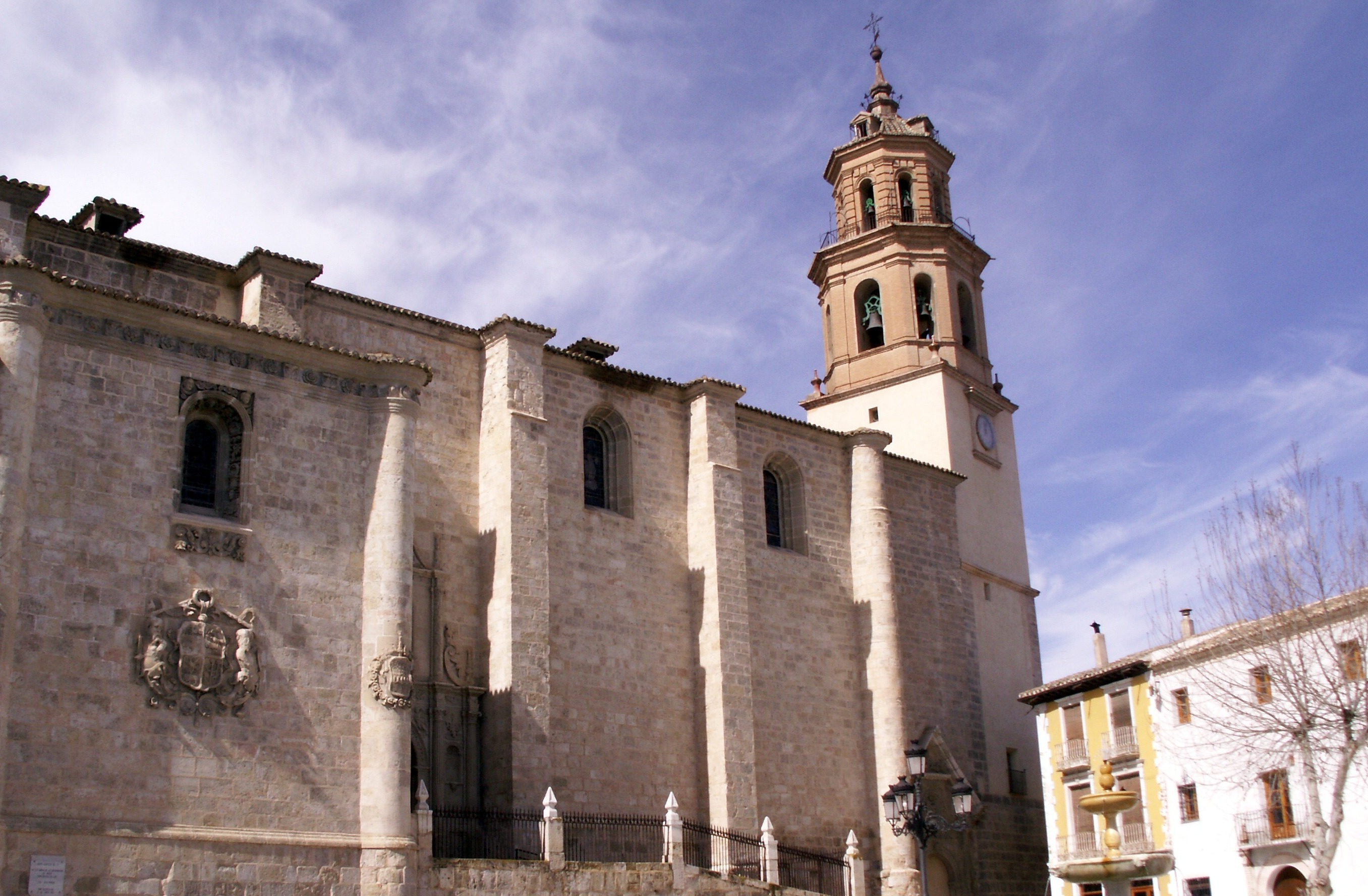
Lateral view of the co-cathedral.

The Co-Cathedral of Baza, also known as the Colegiata de Nuestra Señora Santa María de la Encarnación, is the main Roman Catholic church in Baza, Province of Granada, Spain. Begun in 1529 atop the site of a mosque, the initial Gothic architecture building collapsed after an earthquake two years later. It was elaborately rebuilt in a Renaissance style by 1549. The church has a tall bell-tower with an octagonal lantern.
