= Altiplano Granadino =

Spectrum of landscapes in the Granada province, Spain

The Altiplano de Granada (Granada High Plains) is a spectrum of landscapes located in the northern part of the Granada province in southern Spain. Administratively it is made up of two municipal territories: Baza and Huéscar.

Topography

The altiplano consists of a high plain (700 –1000 metres) surrounded by several high mountain ranges; Sierra Castril and Sierra del Pozo to the north, Sierra de Orce and Sierra Maria to the West, and Sierra de Baza in the south. The area includes the Hoya de Baza and the valleys of the Galera, Huescar and Guardal rivers. Approximately 8 million years ago the altiplano is thought to have formed a huge inlet that connected the Atlantic and the Mediterranean Sea. As the mountain building activity associated with the Sierra Nevada has raised the area, so the level of the sea fell and temporarily formed an inland lake, eventually the area drained to the east, towards the Rio Guadalquivir. The geology of the altiplano is characterised by naturally cemented horizontally arranged oceanic sediments.

Climate

Rainfall in the basin is slight, but precipitation falls on the surrounding mountains and spawns a number of Rivers
