= Sierra Espuña =

Mountain range in the Region of Murcia, Spain

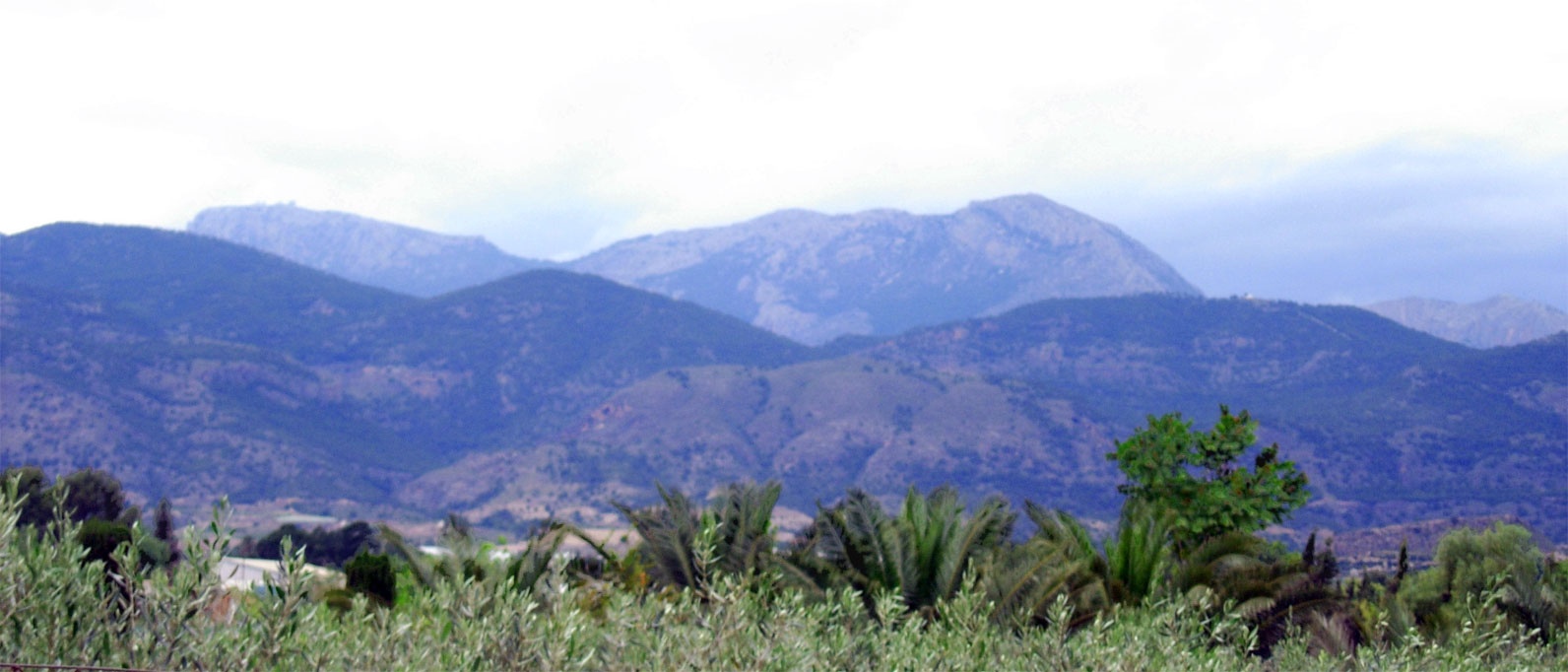

Highest point
- Elevation: 1,583 m (5,194 ft)
- Coordinates: 37°51′20″N 1°30′45″W

Geography
- Location within Spain
- Location: Bajo Guadalentín; Region of Murcia
- Parent range: Penibaetic System, Eastern zone

Geology
- Mountain type: karstic

The Sierra Espuña is a mountain range in the Region of Murcia, Spain. It is part of the Penibaetic System. The Sierra Espuña Regional Park protects 17,804 ha of the mountain range in the municipalities of Alhama de Murcia, Totana and Mula. The highest peak, also known as Espuña, is at 1,583 metres. The summit itself is a military area. It houses the 13th Air Surveillance Squadron (EVA 13) radar station, part of the Spanish Air and Space Force.

By the end of the 19th century, the entire mountain range was in a poor ecological state, with the almost total loss of its tree cover and at risk of desertification. In 1889, the forest engineer Ricardo Codorníu undertook the enormous task of reforesting the entire mountain range. This reforestation task became a model for his time.

In 1931 the area was declared a natural site of national interest, and in 1992 it was protected as a Regional Park. It is also listed as a Special Protection Area for birds and a place of community importance (LIC).

== Sites of interest ==
=== Ricardo Corníu Visitors and Management Centre ===
The Ricardo Corníu Visitors and Management Centre takes its name from the forestry engineer who reforested the entire mountain range in the 19th century. It is an old mansion located in the heart of the Sierra. The centre has an information area, a Projection Room and an Exhibition Room.

=== Huerta Espuña ===
Next to the Visitor Centre is the area known as Huerta Espuña. It was the centre of operations for the restoration work directed by Ricardo Codorniú, where the first experimental crops were planted to study their viability in this environment. Currently you can see orchards that were used, some of them now in use for projects to recover protected wild flora.

=== Pozos de nieve ===
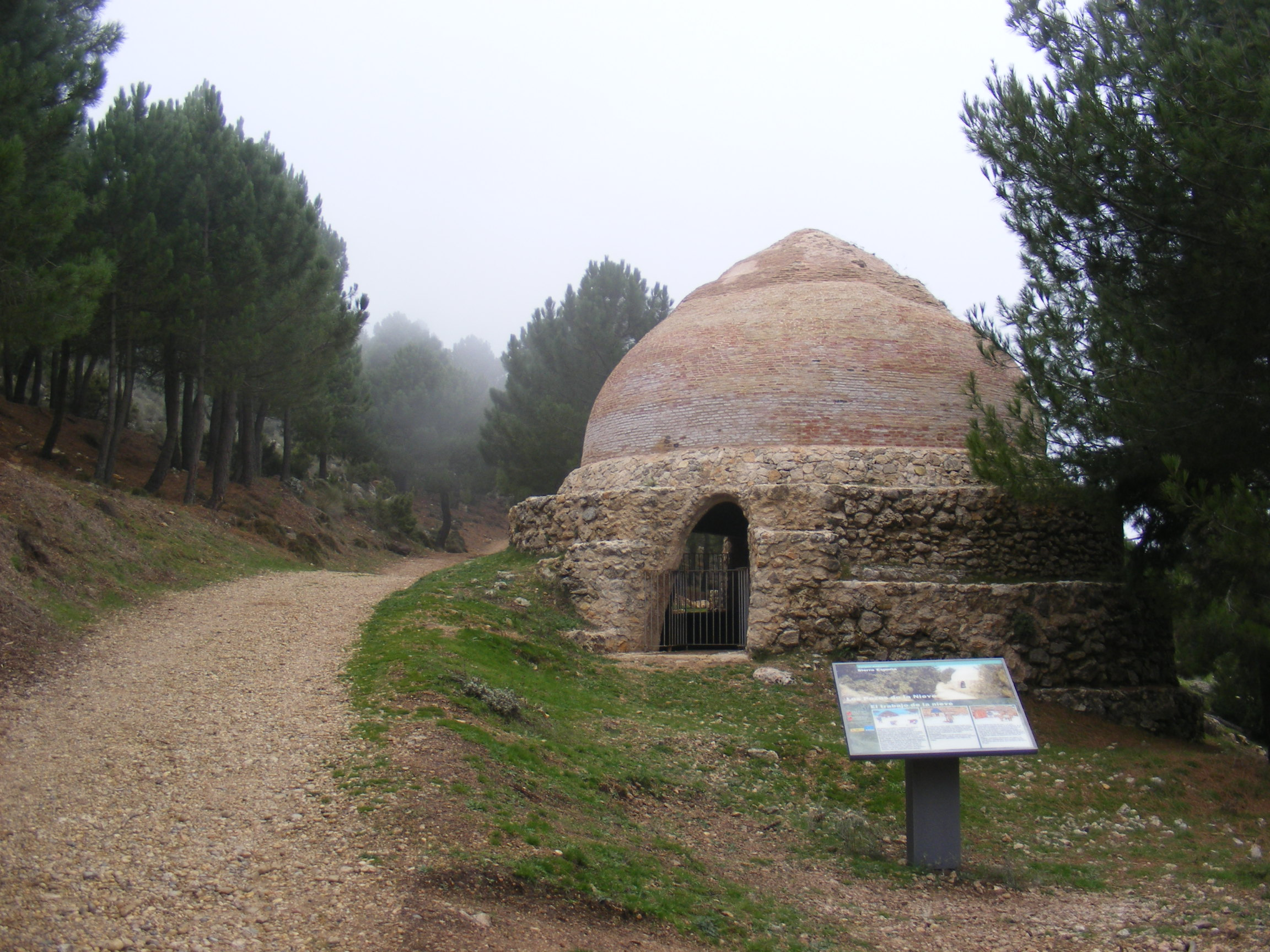
Pozo de nieve de Cartagena

In the high parts of the sierra are the Pozos de nieve ("snow wells"), ice houses first built at the end of the 16th century to store snow in winter and distribute it in summer in the form of ice to hospitals, cities and towns in the Kingdom of Murcia. These ice houses were in use until the 1920s.

=== Collado Bermejo viewpoint ===
The viewpoint provides panoramic views of the entire Sierra, and is located at an altitude of 1,201 m.

=== Barrancos de Gebas ===
The Gebas barrancos (ravines) are to the east of the main sierra below the village of Gebas. Formed millions of years ago, as a brine lake under the sea, they have a stark difference to the surrounding landscape. The best view is from the Librilla side of the Barrancos as the elevation gives you a view of the whole of the area.

== Fauna and flora ==
Large parts of the Sierra Espuña are covered with pine trees. Oleanders, poplars, elms, birches and willows are found in the riverbeds and ravines.

The diverse fauna of the Sierra includes around 120 species of birds, including eagles, jays, hawks, sparrowhawks, eagle owls and larks. Wild boar and squirrels can also be found here. The Barbary sheep was introduced to the Sierra Espuña in the 1970s.

== Climate ==
The climate of the Sierra Espuña differs from the rest of the Murcia region: there is around 200 millimeters more precipitation per year, and the temperature is around five degrees Celsius below the regional average.
