= Baza, Perm Krai =

Baza База
- Settlement
- Location within Perm Krai Location within Russia
- Coordinates: 59°25′N 57°19′E
- Country: Russia
- Region: Perm Krai
- District: Alexandrovsky District
- Time zone: UTC+5:00

Baza (Russian: База) is a rural locality (a settlement) in Yayvinskoye Urban Settlement, Alexandrovsky District, Perm Krai, Russia. The population was 7 as of 2010.

== Geography ==
It is located 14 km north from Yayva.
