= Baza PMS-113 railway station =

Railway station in Russia

Baza PMS-113 База ПМС-113

General information
- Location: Russia
- Coordinates: 59°09′54″N 40°00′07″E
- Owner: Russian Railways
- Operator: Russian Railways

Construction
- Parking: Available

Other information
- Status: Functioning
- Station code: 300130
- Fare zone: Northwestern Federal District
Location

Baza PMS-113 (Russian: База ПМС-113) is a railway station near Vologda, Russia. It is located on the Northern Railway.
