= Baza, Granada =

Town in Granada, Spain

Baza
- Municipality
- Flag Coat of arms

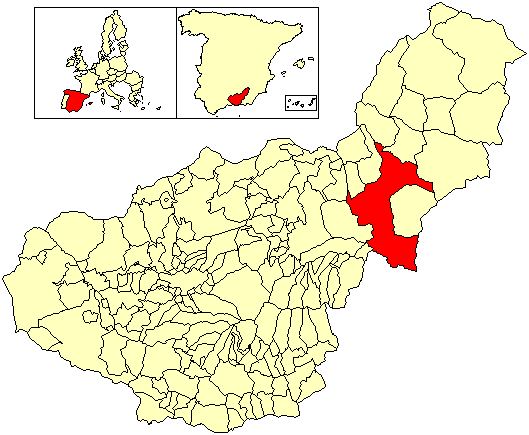

- Location in Spain
- Coordinates: 37°29′N 2°46′W
- Country: Spain
- Autonomous community: Andalusia
- Province: Granada
- Comarca: Baza
- Judicial district: Baza
- Founded: Between 1810 and 500 BC

Government
  - Alcalde: Pedro Fernández Peñalver (2007) (PSOE)

Area
  - Total: 545 km^{2} (210 sq mi)
- Elevation: 844 m (2,769 ft)

Population (2025-01-01)
  - Total: 20,587
  - Density: 37.8/km^{2} (97.8/sq mi)
- Demonym(s): Bastetano, na
- Time zone: UTC+1 (CET)
  - Summer (DST): UTC+2 (CEST)
- Postal code: 18800
- Dialing code: (+34) 958
- Website: Official website

Baza is a town in the province of Granada in Andalusia (southern Spain), twice a former Catholic bishopric and now a Latin Catholic titular see as Basti.

== Modern town ==
It has 21,000 inhabitants (2003). It is situated at 844 m above sea level, in the Hoya de Baza, a valley of the Sierra Nevada, not far from the Gallego River. This town gives its name to the Sierra de Baza. The dome-shaped mountain of Jabalcón overlooks the town from the north-west. The Municipality lies at the southern edge of the Altiplano de Granada.

== History ==
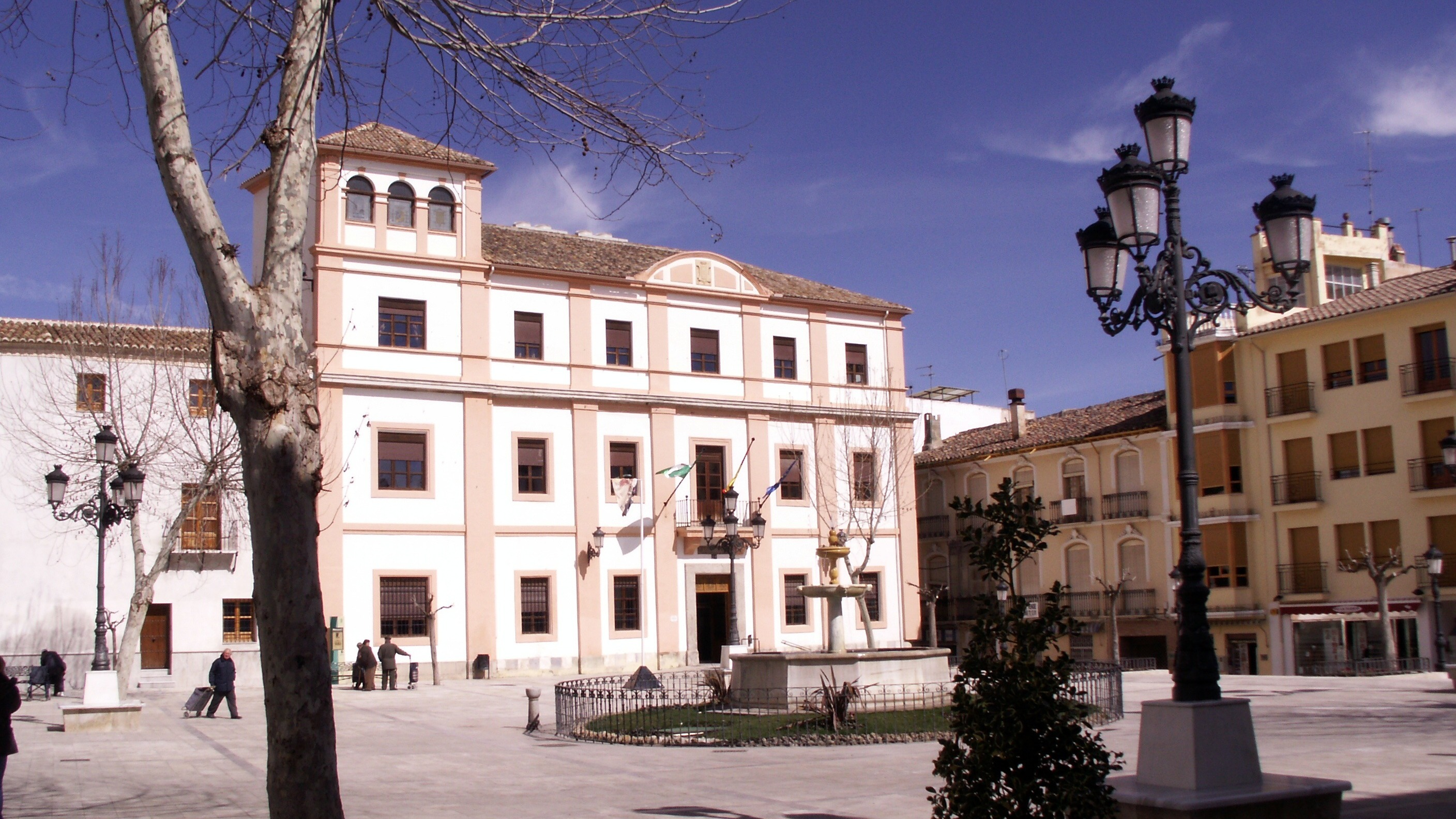
Town Hall of Baza

The sculpture of the Lady of Baza is an Iberian Iron Age artifact discovered in this area on 22 July 1971. The city was founded by the Iberians in the 4th century BC and named Basti, the name by which it was known in Roman times. As part of the Roman province of Tarraco, it was an important commercial center and an early bishopric (see below).

Under the Moors, Baza was an important frontier post along the border with the kingdom of Murcia. It was also a major commercial center, with a population upward of 50,000, making it one of the three most important cities in the Kingdom of Granada.

Under Islamic rule (713 – 1489), the cathedral, founded by the Visigoth king Reccared in about 600, and whose traditional site is occupied by the ancient church of San Máximo, was converted into a mosque and the bishopric was doomed.

In the 11th century, a Jewish community was present in Baza. A Jewish ritual bath, or mikveh, was excavated where the old judería existed.

In 1489, during the Granada War, the city fell to Queen Isabella I of Castile, after a stubborn defense lasting seven months. The cannons still adorn the Alameda.

On 10 August 1810, French forces under Marshal Nicolas Jean de Dieu Soult defeated a large Spanish force near the town.

== Ecclesiastical history ==
The bishopric of Basti was in existence by 306, the date of the Council of Elvira, which was attended by its bishop Eutychianus. The names of other bishops of Basti also are known through their participation in various Councils of Toledo. The cathedral was founded by the Visigoth king Reccared in about 600; its traditional site is occupied by the ancient church of San Máximo.

The diocese survived for some time the Moorish conquest but was suppressed in the 8th century, perhaps with errant bishops, while under Islamic rule (713 – 1489), the cathedral was converted into a mosque and the bishopric disappeared in the 13th century, but was restored in 1306.

After the Reconquista, the territories of the two historical sees of Basti and Ancient Acci were united on 21 May 1492 as the modern Diocese of Guadix, a suffragan of the Archdiocese of Granada. A collegiate church, the Colegiata de Nuestra Señora Santa María de la Encarnación, Baza, was established at Basti/Baza. This was reluctant to accept rule from Guadix. As a compromise, the collegiate church was given authority, under the bishop, over twelve parishes, and the bishopric adopted a second name, diocese of Guadix-Baza, indicating a union of two dioceses under a single bishop. This continued until 1851, when the collegiate church became a simple parish church and the diocese resumed the name of Diocese of Guadix.

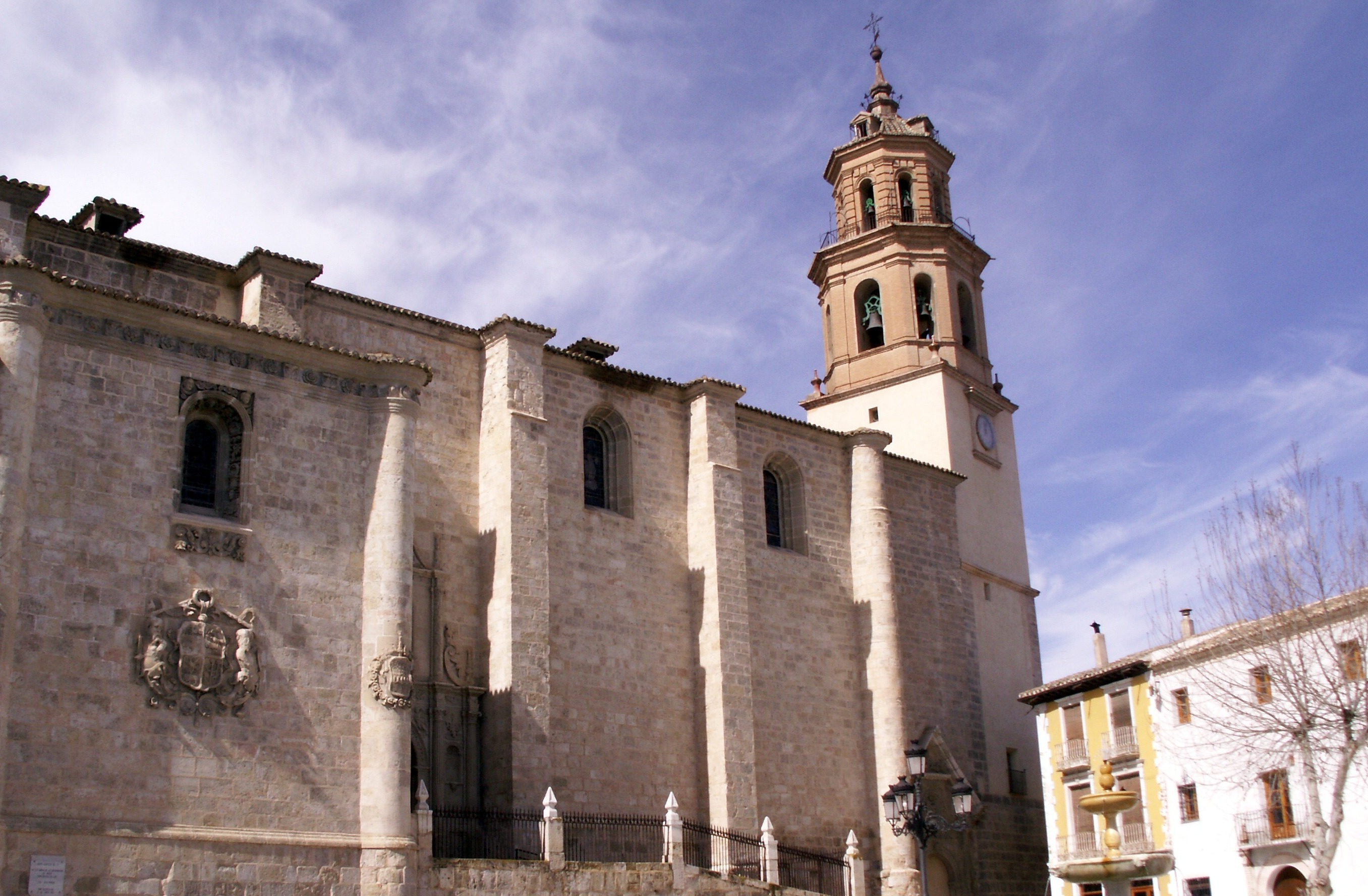
Baza's co-cathedral of the Incarnation

The former cathedral of Our Lady of the Incarnation, however, rebuilt on the rubble of the mosque which the original had been converted into, retains the status of co-cathedral of the Diocese of Guadix-Baza (suffragan of Granada).

=== Episcopal ordinaries ===
Pre-Moorish Bishops of Baza

- Saint Bishop Tesifón (? – ?)
- Eutiquiano (? – ?)
- Teodoro (589? – ?)
- Eterio I? (? – ?)
- Eusebio (633? – 638?)
- Siervo de Dios (653? – 655?)
- Eterio II? (675? – ?)
- Antoniano (681? – 684?)
- Basilio (688? – 693?)

Bishops of refounded Baza
(incomplete)

- Beltrán de Boyria (1484? – ?)

=== Titular see ===
No longer a residential bishopric, Basti (alias Baza) is listed by the Catholic Church as a Latin titular bishopric, suffragan of the Archdiocese of Toledo, nominally restored in 1969 as Titular bishopric of Basti (Curiate Italian) / Basticen(sis) (Latin adjective).

It has had the following incumbents, so far of the fitting Episcopal (lowest) rank :

- Martien Antoon Jansen (1970.01.02 – resigned 1970.11.29)
- Sándor Klempa, O. Praem. (1972.02.08 – death 1985.12.19)
- Mario Lezana Vaca (1986.05.17 – resigned 1998.03.07)
- Jesús García Burillo (1998.06.19 – 2003.01.09)
- Antonio Marino (2003.04.11 – 2011.04.06)
- David William Antonio (2011.06.15 – 2018.11.14)
- Joseba Segura Etxezarraga (2019-02.12 – 2021.05.11)
- Benedek Szabolcs Fekete (since 2022.03.11)

== Transport ==
Until 1985, Baza was served by a railway station on the Ferrocarril del Almanzora, which linked Murcia del Carmen to Granada via Lorca, Baza and Guadix. Reopening this line has been proposed.

The northern branch of the A-92 highway also passes next to the town.

== Cultural references ==
The 1489 siege of Baza is described in Washington Irving's book The Conquest of Granada.

== Notable people ==
- David Valero, Spanish cyclist

== See also ==
- List of Catholic dioceses in Spain, Andorra, Ceuta and Gibraltar
- List of municipalities in Granada

== Sources and external links ==
- (in English) Baza Information - General Information about house sales in Baza
- GCatholic - Baza bishopric

== Bibliography ==
- Pius Bonifacius Gams (1931). Series episcoporum Ecclesiae Catholicae. Leipzig. p. 3.
- España Sagrada. Vol. VII. Madrid. 1750. pp. 80–96.
- Lambert, A. (1932). "Basti". Dictionnaire d'Histoire et de Géographie ecclésiastiques. 1288-1291. Vol. VI. Paris.
- Bertrand, Maryelle; Pérez Cruz, Maria de los Ángeles; Sánchez Quirante, Lorenzo (2000). "Los baños árabes de Baza. 1ª intervención de urgencia en apoyo a la restauración" (PDF). Anuario Arqueológico de Andalucía: 598–616.
