= Sierra de Mijas =

Mountain range in Spain

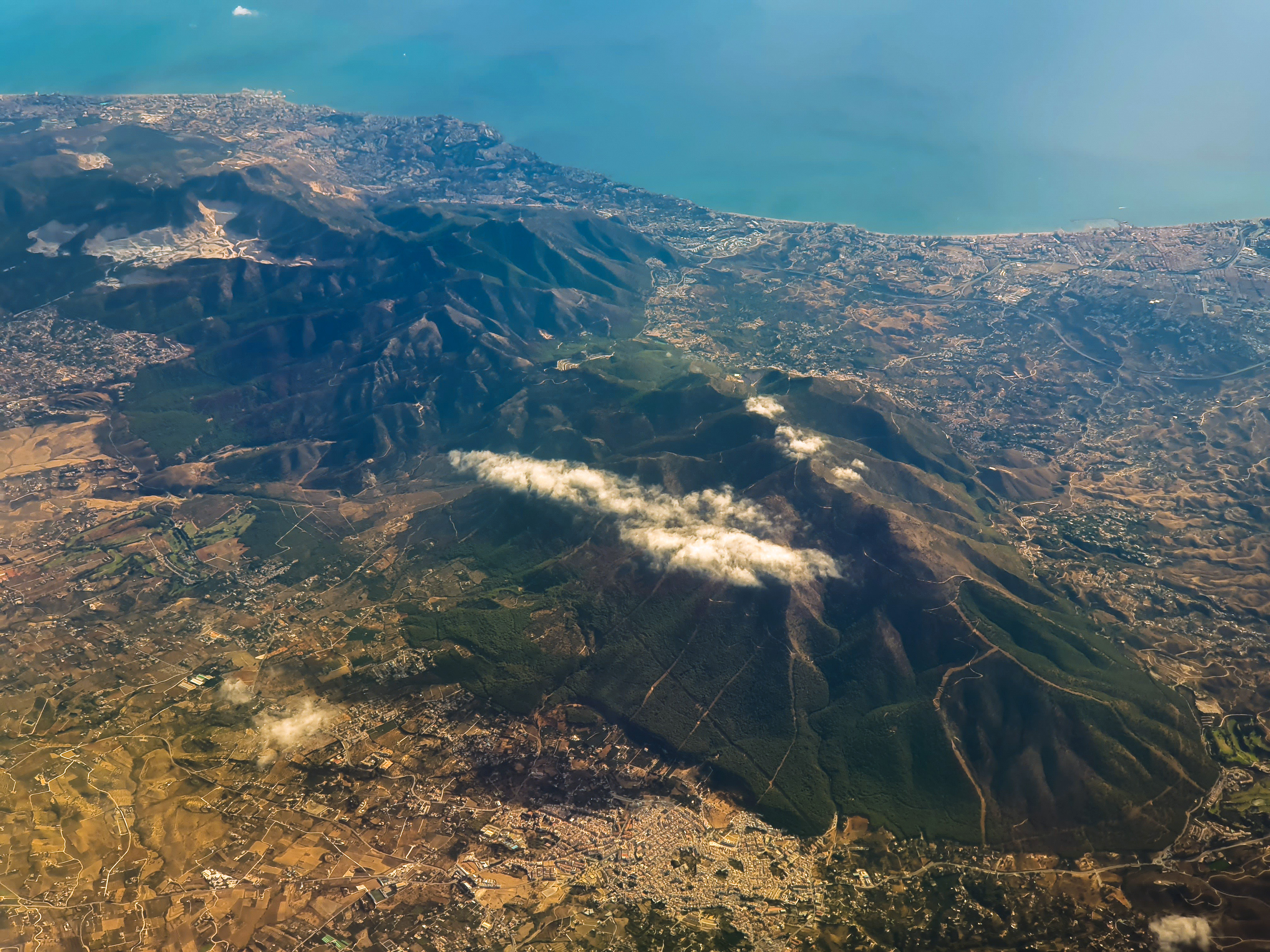
- Aerial view of the Sierra de Mijas

Highest point
- Elevation: 1,150 m (3,770 ft)
- Coordinates: 36°37′32″N 04°39′24″W

Geography
- Location within Spain
- Location: Andalusia
- Parent range: Penibaetic System

Geology
- Mountain type(s): marble and limestone

Climbing
- First ascent: Unknown

The Sierra de Mijas is a mountain range in southern Spain, part of the coastal mountain range that lies behind the Costa del Sol Occidental, in Andalusia. It separates the Valle del Guadalhorce region from the Costa del Sol.

The highest point is the Pico Mijas at 1,150 metres. Geologically it is located in the inner part of the Cordillera Bética. It is traditionally divided into two sectors (Complejo alpujárride and Complejo maláguide), and is mostly composed of marble and, to a lesser extent, limestone.

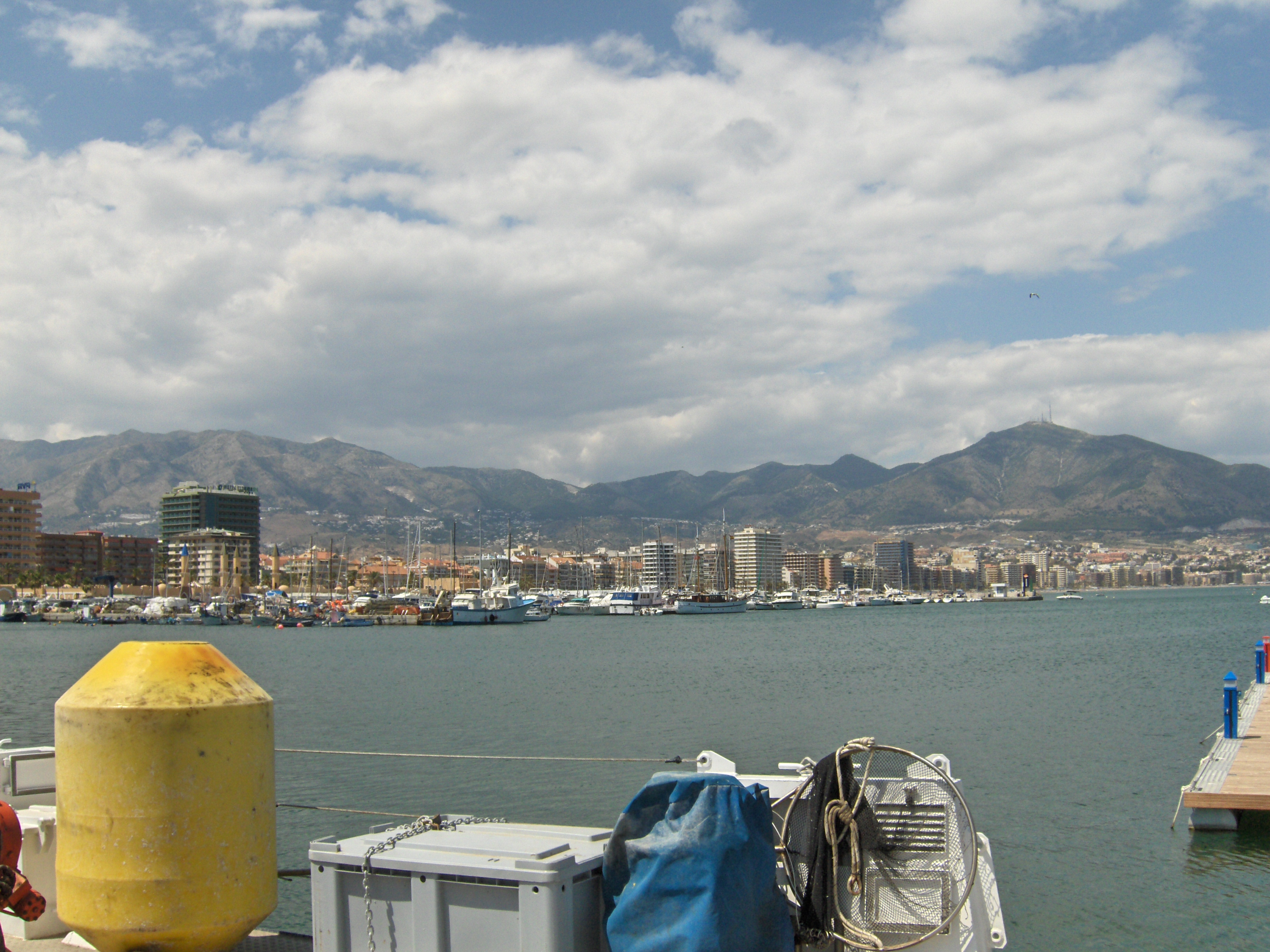
The Sierra de Mijas seen from Fuengirola harbour

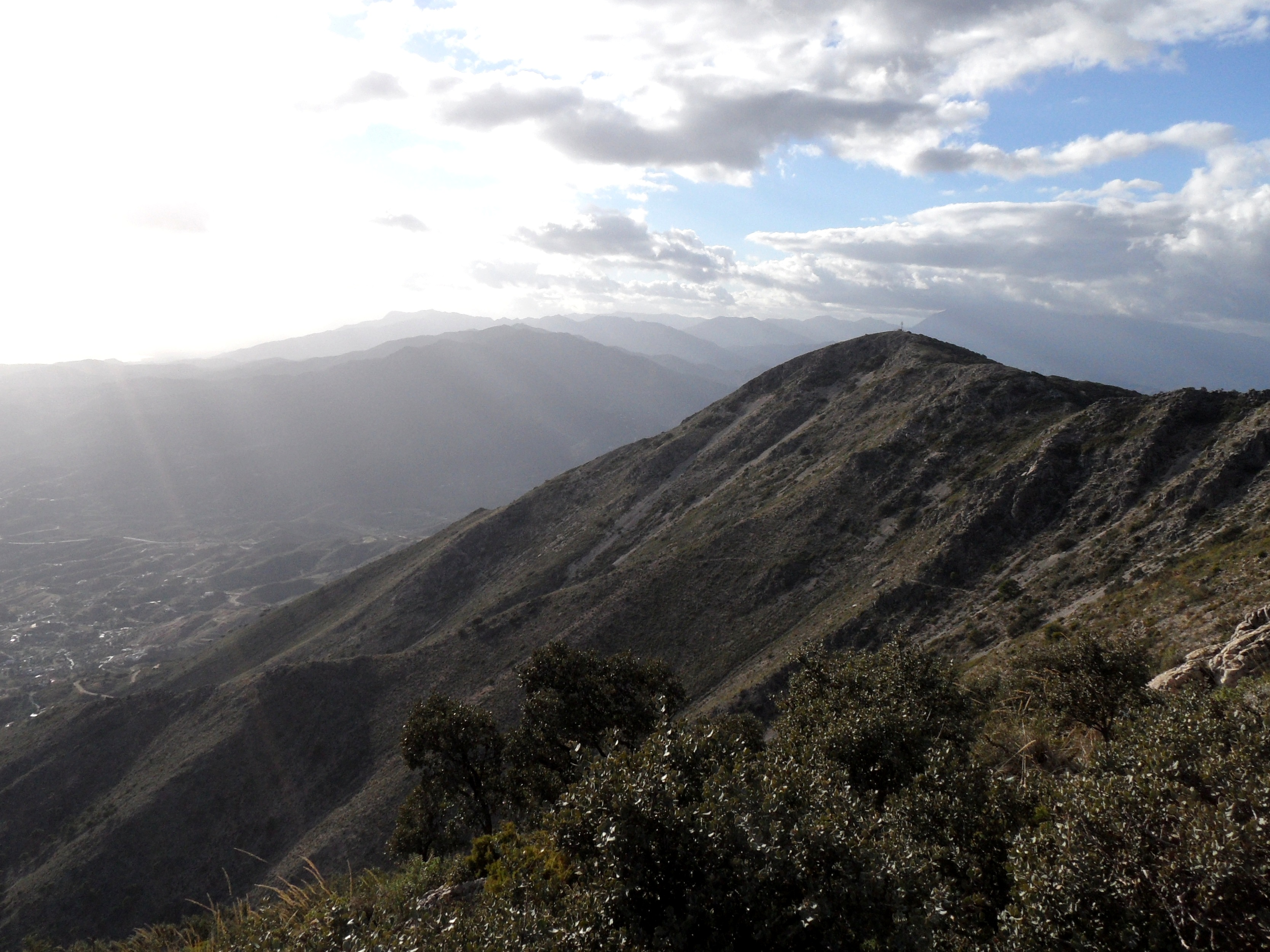
View west from Pico Mijas

== Sources ==
- Pérez, Eduardo (2005). Conocer la Sierra de Mijas. Juan Morente.
