= Babuza =

Babuza may refer to:

- The Babuza people of Taiwan
- The Babuza language, spoken in Taiwan
