= Jabalcón =

Mountain in Spain

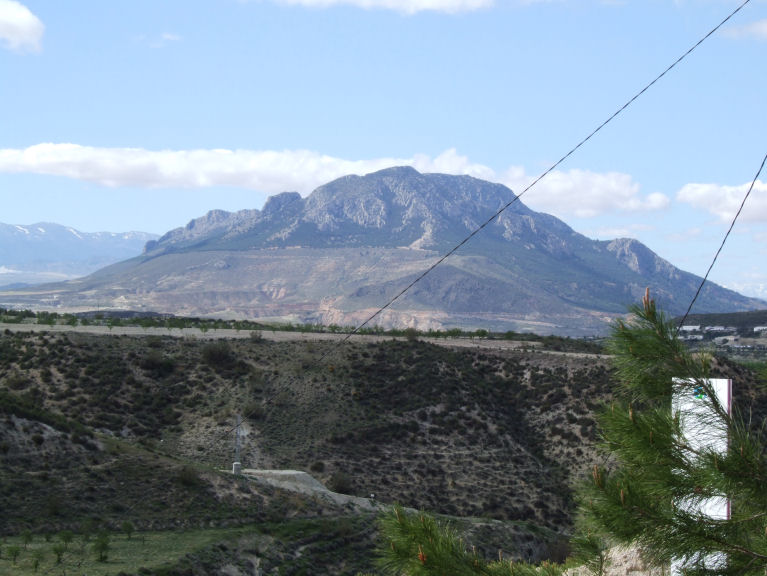
- Jabalcon seen from 6 km away

Highest point
- Elevation: 1,494 m (4,902 ft)
- Coordinates: 37°34′33″N 02°49′08″W

Geography
- Location within Province of Granada Location within Spain
- Location: Province of Granada, Andalusia
- Parent range: Cordillera Penibética

Geology
- Mountain type: Limestone

Climbing
- Easiest route: From Zújar

Jabalcón or Cerro Jabalcón is a mountain near the city of Baza in the province of Granada in Spain. It reaches a height of 1,494 metres above sea level.

At the foot of Javalon are the Baños de Zújar (baths of Zújar). They maintain a temperature over 30°C all year round, and are heated by a geo-thermal source underground.

The mountain also has a church situated on top as well as television and other communication towers. Paragliders frequently launch from the top of here as the mountain is surrounded by relatively flat land.

== Geology ==
Popular legend claims that this hill is an extinct volcano because of its dome-shape and the geo-thermal sources at its base. It is however an isolated limestone outcrop, made up of dolomite, similar to the composition of the Sierra de Baza mountains further away.
