= Hoya of Baza =

Valley in Granada, Andalusia, southern Spain

Coordinates: 37.6°N 2.7°W

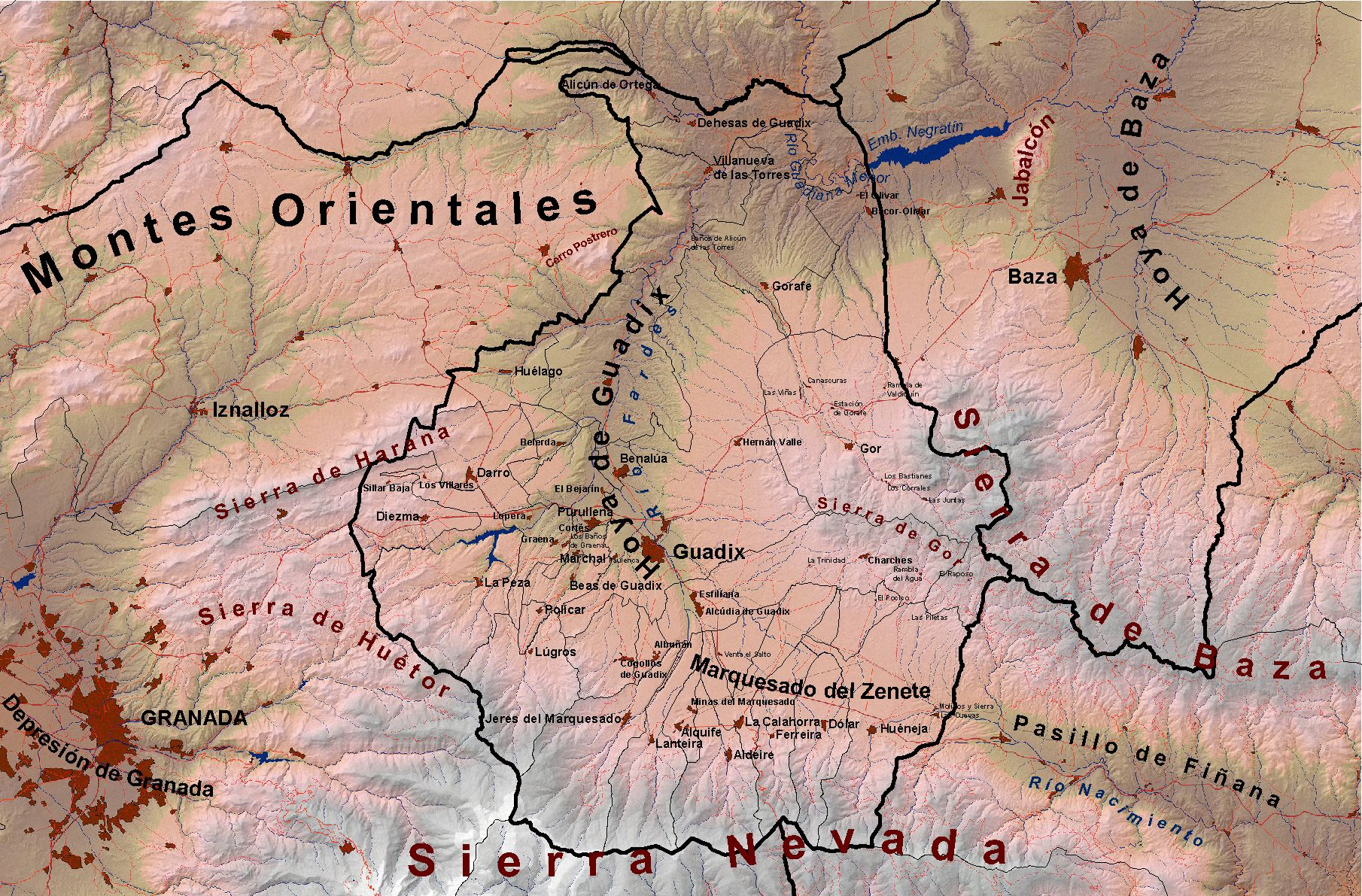
Location of the Hoya de Baza (at upper right)

The Hoya of Baza is a valley in the northern part of the province of Granada, Andalusia, southern Spain, named after the town and former bishopric Baza, Granada. It is one of the series of valleys forming the Surco Intrabético.

It formed during the Alpine orogeny of the Cenozoic Era. Initially, it was a large lake that filled in with Paleogene, Neogene and Quaternary materials. It was originally part of the Mediterranean basin, connected to the sea by the corridor of the Almanzora River. Later, the action of the African and Eurasian tectonic plates raised it upward to become an endorheic lake (that is, one without an outlet) 1,000 metres (3,300 ft) above sea level.

The term "hoya" literally means "trough" and refers to the boxed in character of the area.

The Hoya of Baza is surrounded by an imposing belt of mountain ranges, many of them over 2,000 metres (6,600 ft) in altitude: the Sierra de Baza, Sierra de la Sagra, Sierra de Cazorla, Sierra de Orce, and Sierra de las Estancias. The Cerro Jabalcón separates the Hoya of Baza from the Hoya of Guadix.

The Hoya is generally relatively flat, but cut by a dense network of rivers that form a maze of gullies and ravines known as badlands.

Apart from the fertile plains and other places that have been worked, the territory is steppe, bearing only shrubbery typical of cold regions.

== See also ==
- Baza, Granada
