= Sierra de Baza =

Mountain range near Baza in the Granada province in Spain

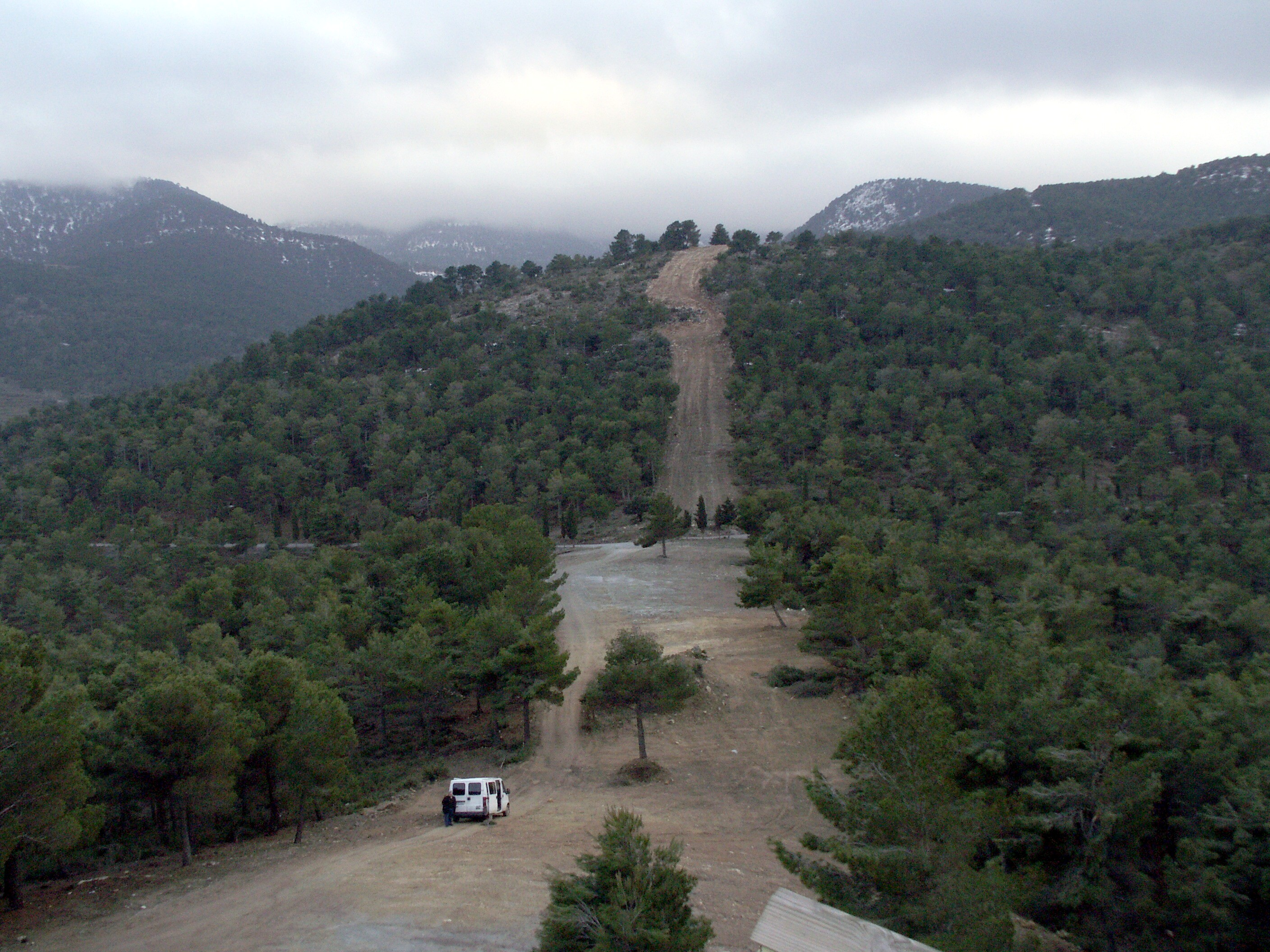
- Firebreak in Sierra de Baza

Highest point
- Peak: Calar de Santa Bárbara
- Elevation: 2,269 m (7,444 ft)
- Prominence: 1,153 m (3,783 ft)
- Listing: Ribu
- Coordinates: 37°23′00″N 02°50′36″W

Geography
- Location within Spain
- Location: Granada province, Andalusia
- Country: Spain
- Parent range: Penibaetic System

Geology
- Mountain type: Limestone

Climbing
- Easiest route: From Baza

Sierra de Baza is a mountain range near the city of Baza in the Granada province in Spain. It is named after the town of Baza and its highest point is the 2,269 m high Calar de Santa Bárbara.

It is located between the Sierra Nevada and the Sierra de Cazorla and Sierra de Segura mountain ranges. It merges towards the east with the Sierra de Los Filabres mountain range.

Sierra de Baza Natural Park (Parque natural de la Sierra de Baza) was designated in 1989 to protect the mountain environment. It covers 536.5 km^{2} of the eastern sierra. A long-distance footpath, the GR 7, passes through the natural park.

== See also ==
- Hoya of Baza
