= Ciudad Residencial Tiempo Libre =

Residential complex in Marbella, Spain

Ciudad Residencial Tiempo Libre (commonly known as Residencia de Tiempo Libre) is an architecturally significant beachside holiday complex in Elviria, Marbella, Spain. Officially designated as an asset of cultural interest, it was designed in the mordernist movement style. The self-contained layout features 199 avant-garde homes integrated alongside extensive communal infrastructure. This includes clubs and restaurants, a reception building, church, health center, shopping center, housing director, and workshop-garage, sports areas, areas dedicated to services and housing staff, and others dedicated to parks and gardens.
