= Torre Río Real =

- Torre Río Real (Spanish)
- Location within Spain
- 36°30′20″N 4°50′43″W
- Type: Tower
- Location: Marbella, Spain

Spanish Cultural Heritage
- Type: Non-movable
- Criteria: Monument
- Designated: 22 June 1993
- Reference no.: RI-51-0008057

Torre Río Real is a tower in Marbella, southern Spain, built in 1575. The tower, located next to the Mediterranean Expressway, is 10.85 metres (35.6 ft) in height and 22 metres (72 ft) in circumference.

Like other beacon towers along the Mediterranean coast of Andalusia, the tower was part of a surveillance system used by the coast and Christian Arabs. Also like the other towers, it has been declared Bien de Interés Cultural.
