= Deutsche Schule Málaga =

Coordinates: 36.5297°N 4.7544°W

- Marbella, Malaga Province; Spain

Information
- Type: German international school
- Established: 1898
- Grades: 1-12

Deutsche Schule in der Provinz Málaga or Deutsche Schule Málaga (DS Málaga; Spanish: Colegio Alemán de Málaga) is a private German international school in Marbella, Malaga Province, Spain. It serves years 1–12, The education begins in early childhood, and ends with Oberstufe/Bachillerato.

The pastor of the German Evangelical Church and the former consul of the Empire of Germany established the school, which educated German and Spanish children and was founded in 1898. It closed in 1945, at the end of World War II, but was re-established in 1967 by Hans (Juan) Hoffmann Heinkeder (Berlin, 1916-Málaga, 1998), the German Consul General in Malaga at the time.
