= Marbella =

City in Andalusia, Spain

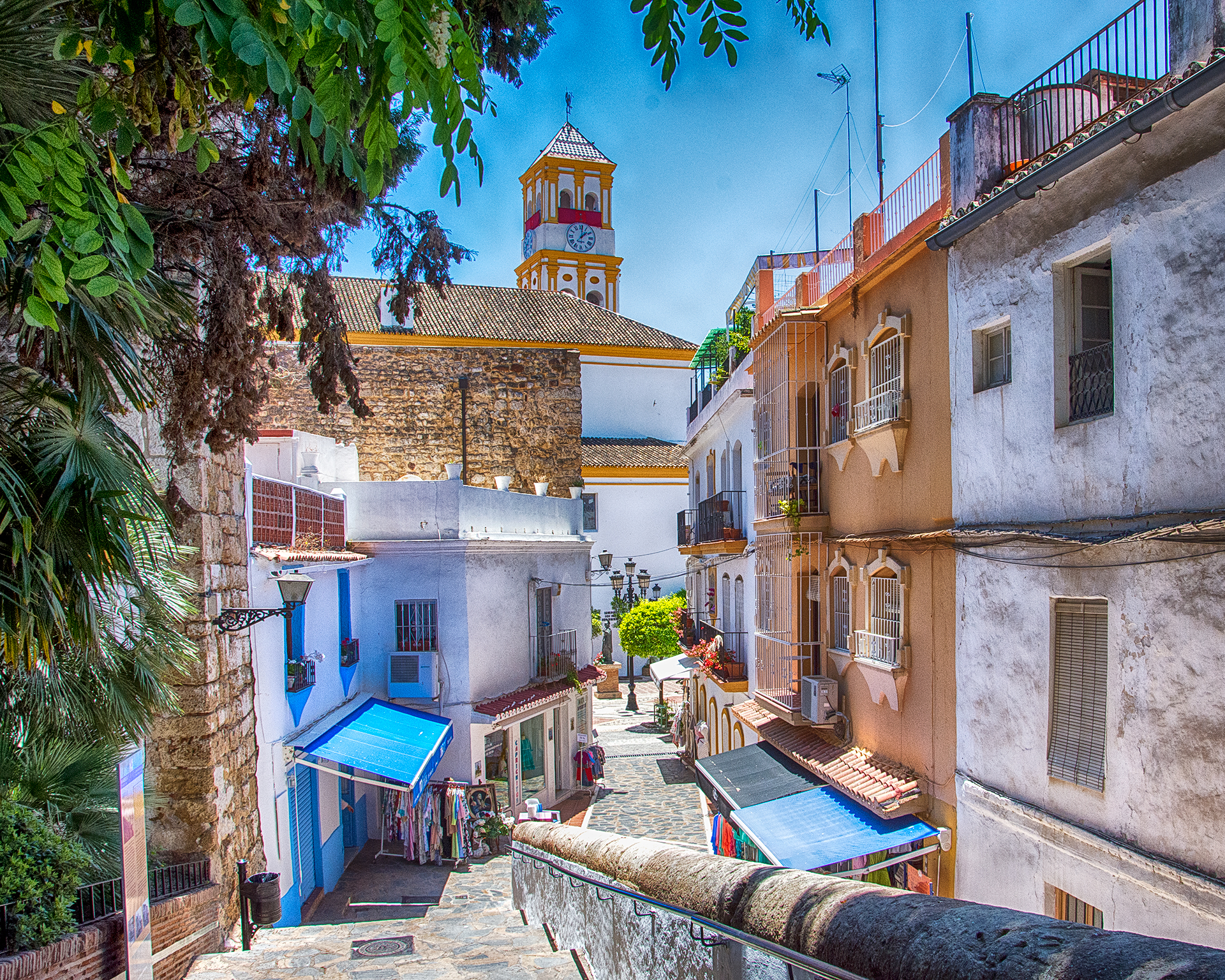
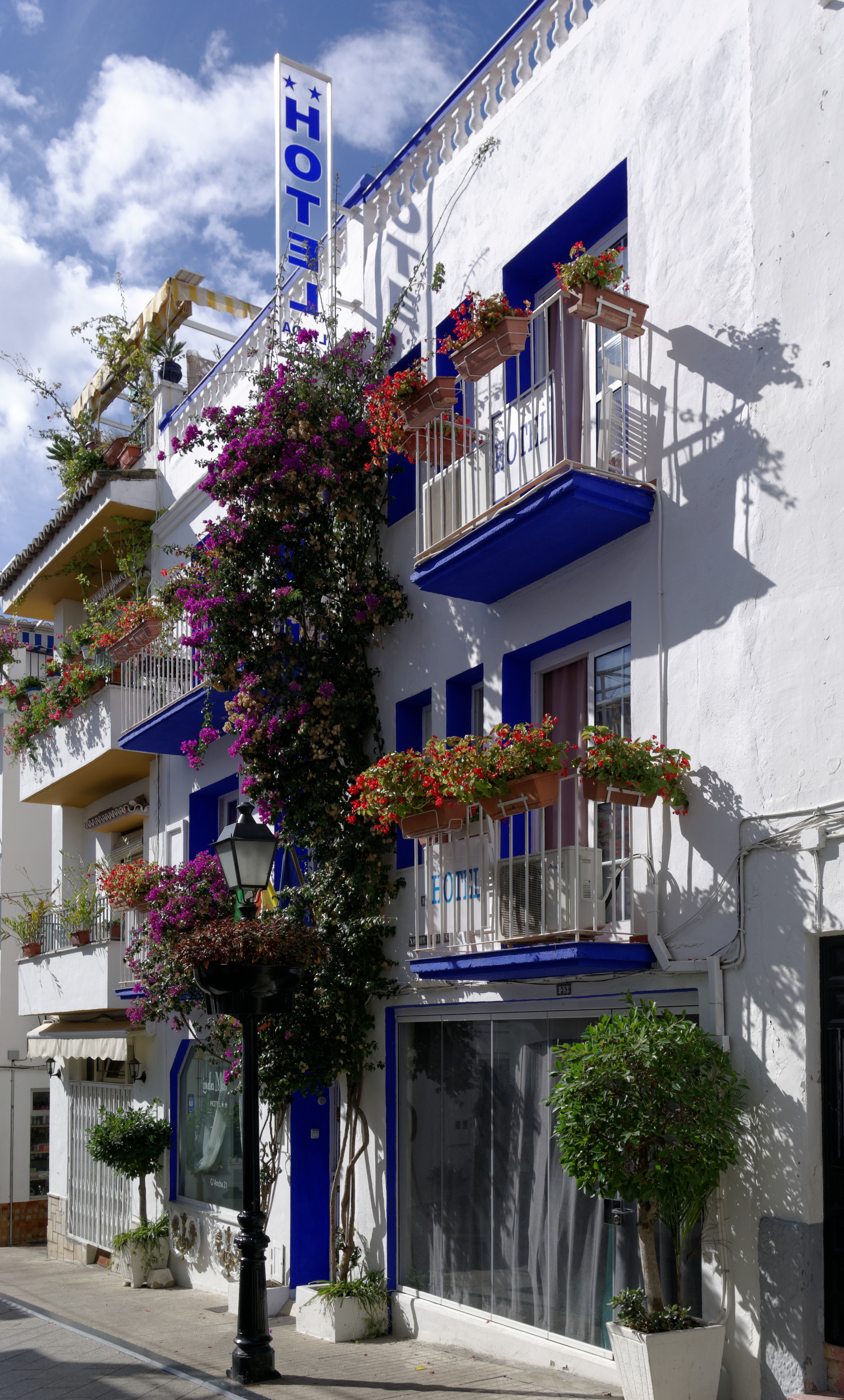
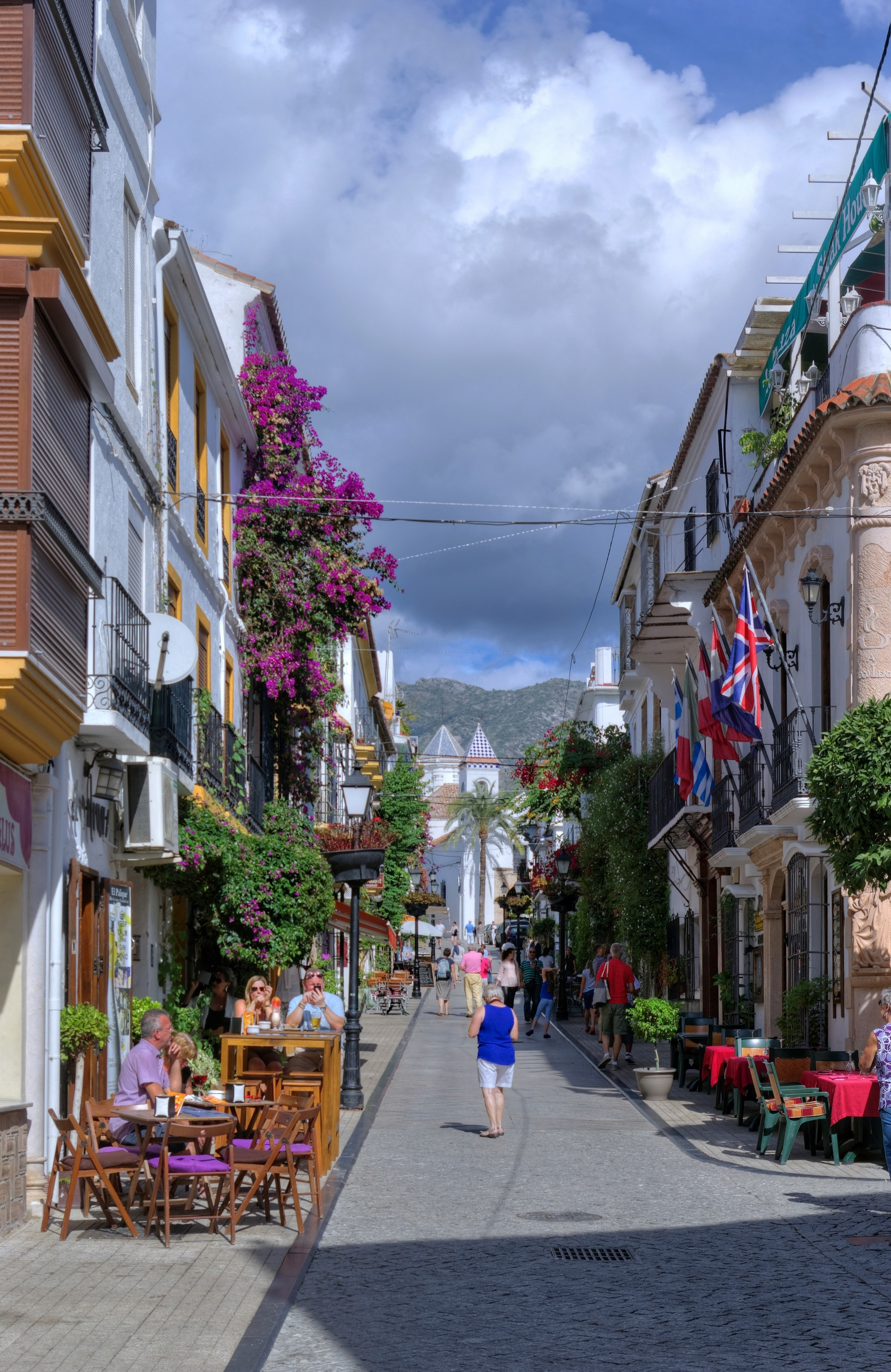
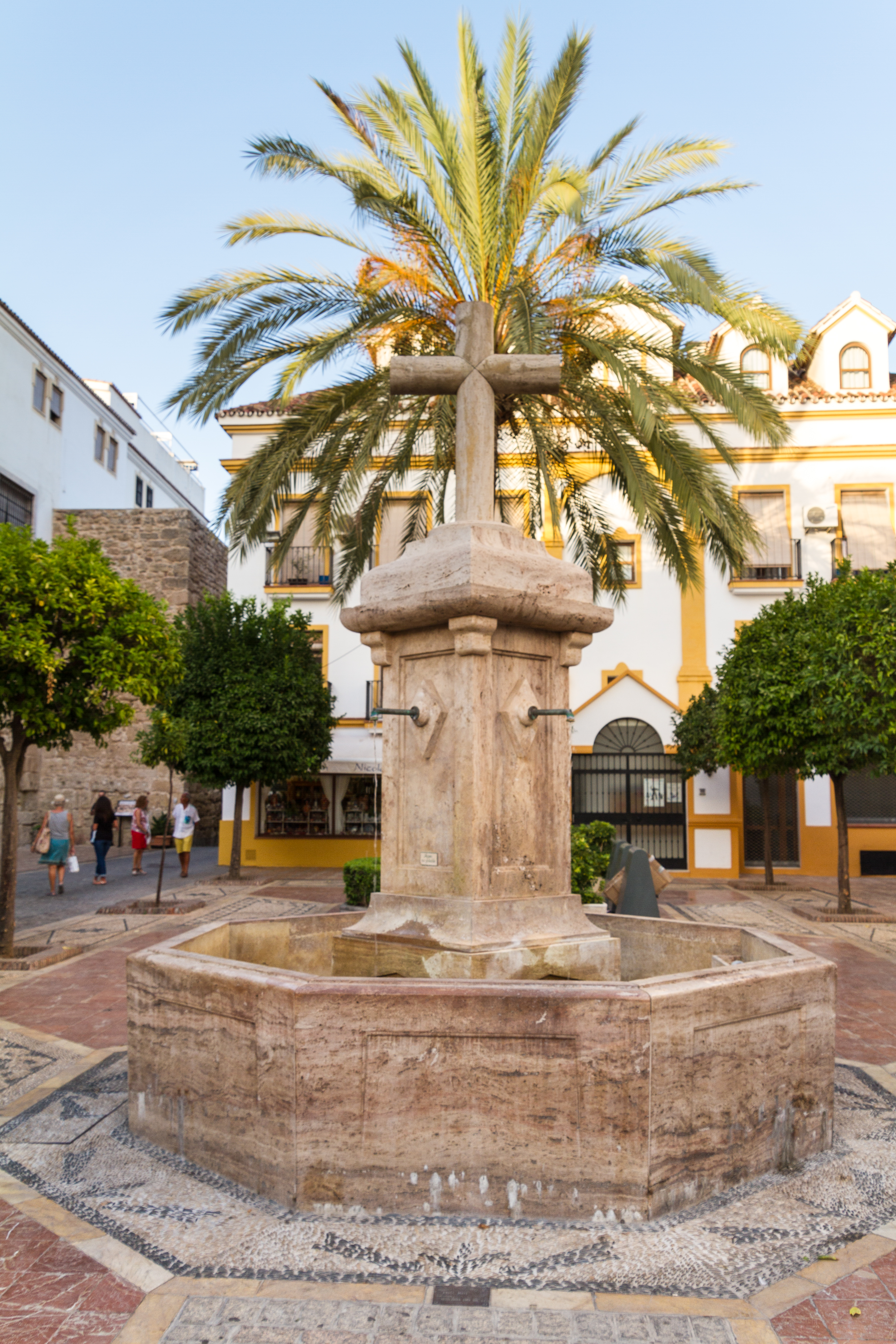
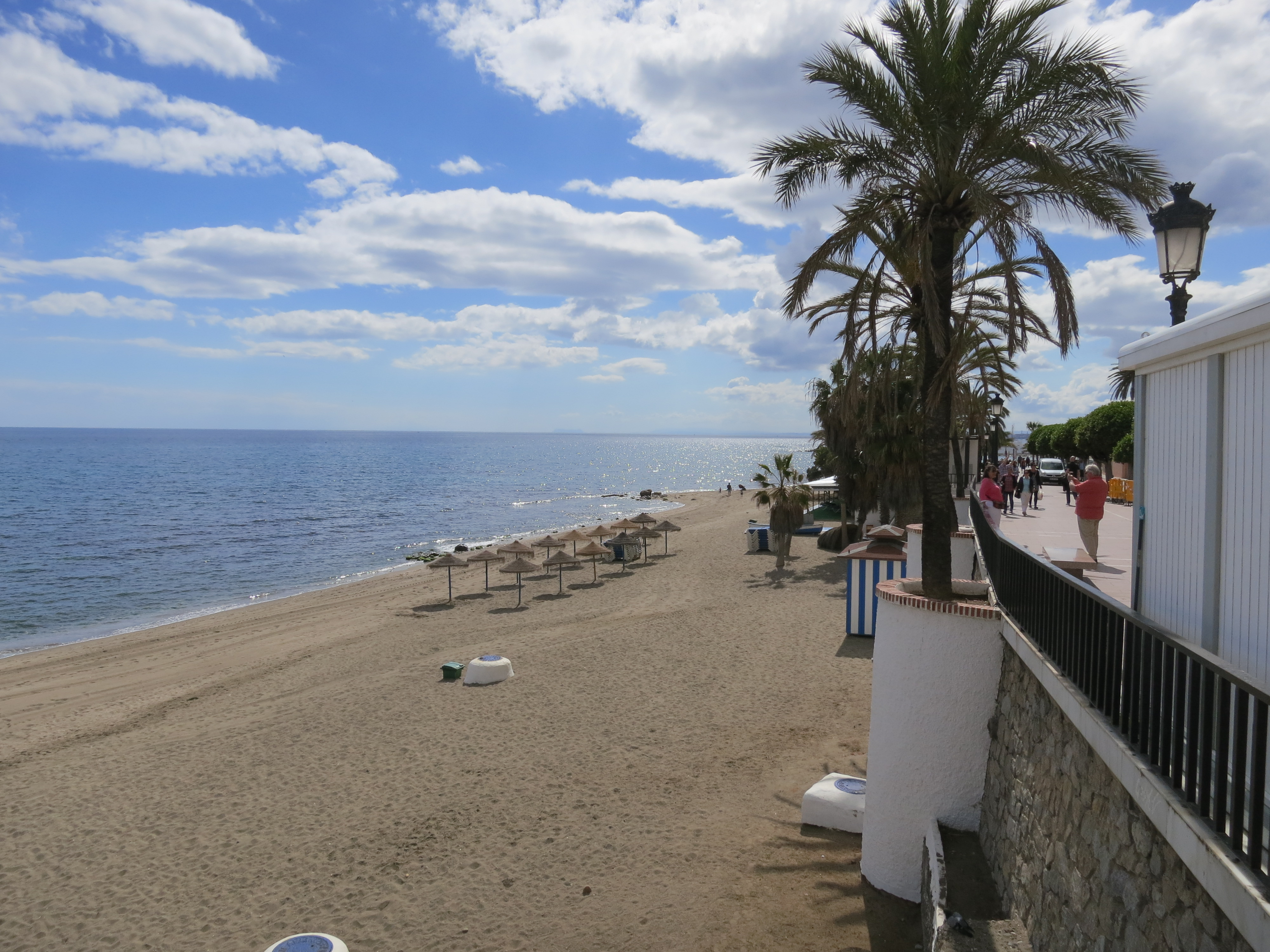
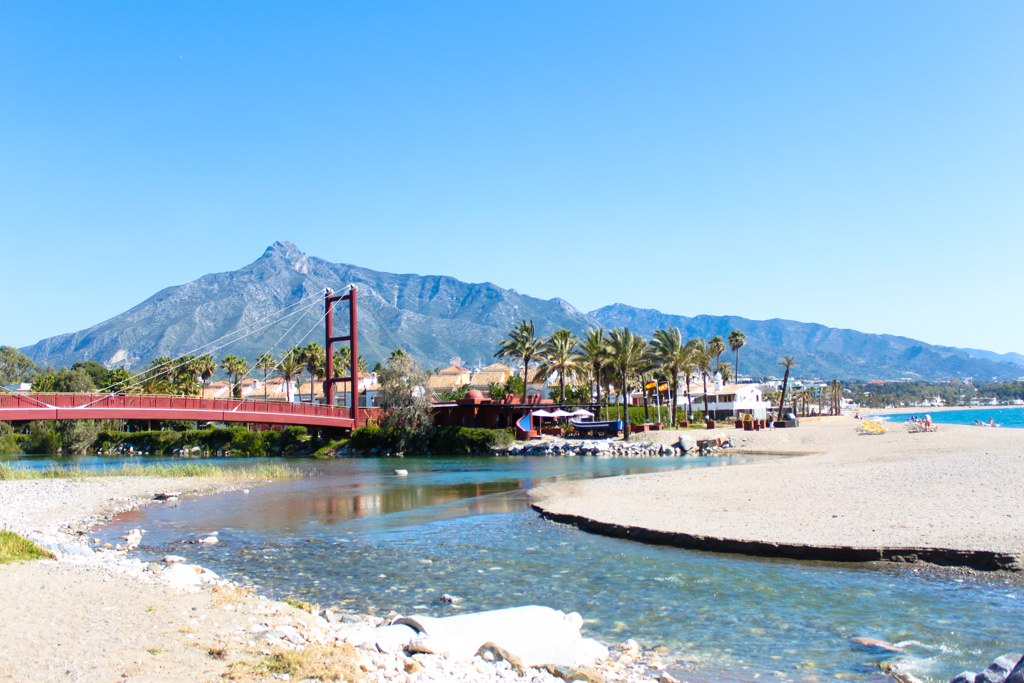
- Marbella sights

- Flag Coat of arms
- Interactive map of Marbella
- Coordinates: 36°31′0″N 4°53′0″W
- Country: Spain
- Autonomous community: Andalusia
- Province: Málaga

Government
  - Type: Mayor–council
  - Body: Ayuntamiento de Marbella
  - Mayor: Ángeles Muñoz (People's Party)

Area
  - Total: 114.3 km^{2} (44.1 sq mi)
  - Land: 114.3 km^{2} (44.1 sq mi)
  - Water: 0.00 km^{2} (0 sq mi)

Population (1 January 2023)
  - Total: 156,295
  - Density: 1,367/km^{2} (3,540/sq mi)
- Time zone: UTC+1 (CET)
  - Summer (DST): UTC+2 (CEST)
- Website: www.marbella.es

Marbella (UK: /mɑːrˈbeɪjə/ mar-BAY-yə, US: /mɑːrˈbɛlə/ mar-BEL-ə, Spanish: [maɾˈβeʎa]) is a city and municipality in southern Spain, belonging to the province of Málaga in the autonomous community of Andalusia. It is part of the Costa del Sol and is the headquarters of the Association of Municipalities of the region; it is also the head of the judicial district that bears its name.

Marbella is situated on the Mediterranean Sea, between Málaga and the Strait of Gibraltar, in the foothills of the Sierra Blanca. The municipality covers an area of 117 square kilometres (45 sq mi) crossed by highways on the coast, which are its main entrances.

In 2023, the population of the city was 156,295 inhabitants, making it the second most populous municipality in the province of Málaga and the seventh in Andalusia. It is one of the most important tourist cities of the Costa del Sol and throughout most of the year is an international tourist attraction, due mainly to its climate and tourist infrastructure. It is also one of the fastest-growing cities in both Andalusia and Spain.

The city also has a significant archaeological heritage, several museums and performance spaces, and a cultural calendar.

== Geography ==
The Marbella municipality occupies a strip of land that extends along forty-four kilometres (27 miles) of coastline of the Penibético region, sheltered by the slopes of the coastal mountain range, which includes the Bermeja, Palmitera, Royal, White and Alpujata sub-ranges. Due to the proximity of the mountains to the coast, the city has a large gap between its north and south sides, thus providing views of the sea and mountain vistas from almost every part of the city. The coastline is heavily urbanised; most of the land not built up with golf courses has been developed with small residential areas. Marbella is bordered on the north by the municipalities of Istán and Ojén, on the northwest by Benahavís, on the west by Estepona and on the northeast by Mijas. The Mediterranean Sea lies to the south.

=== Topography ===
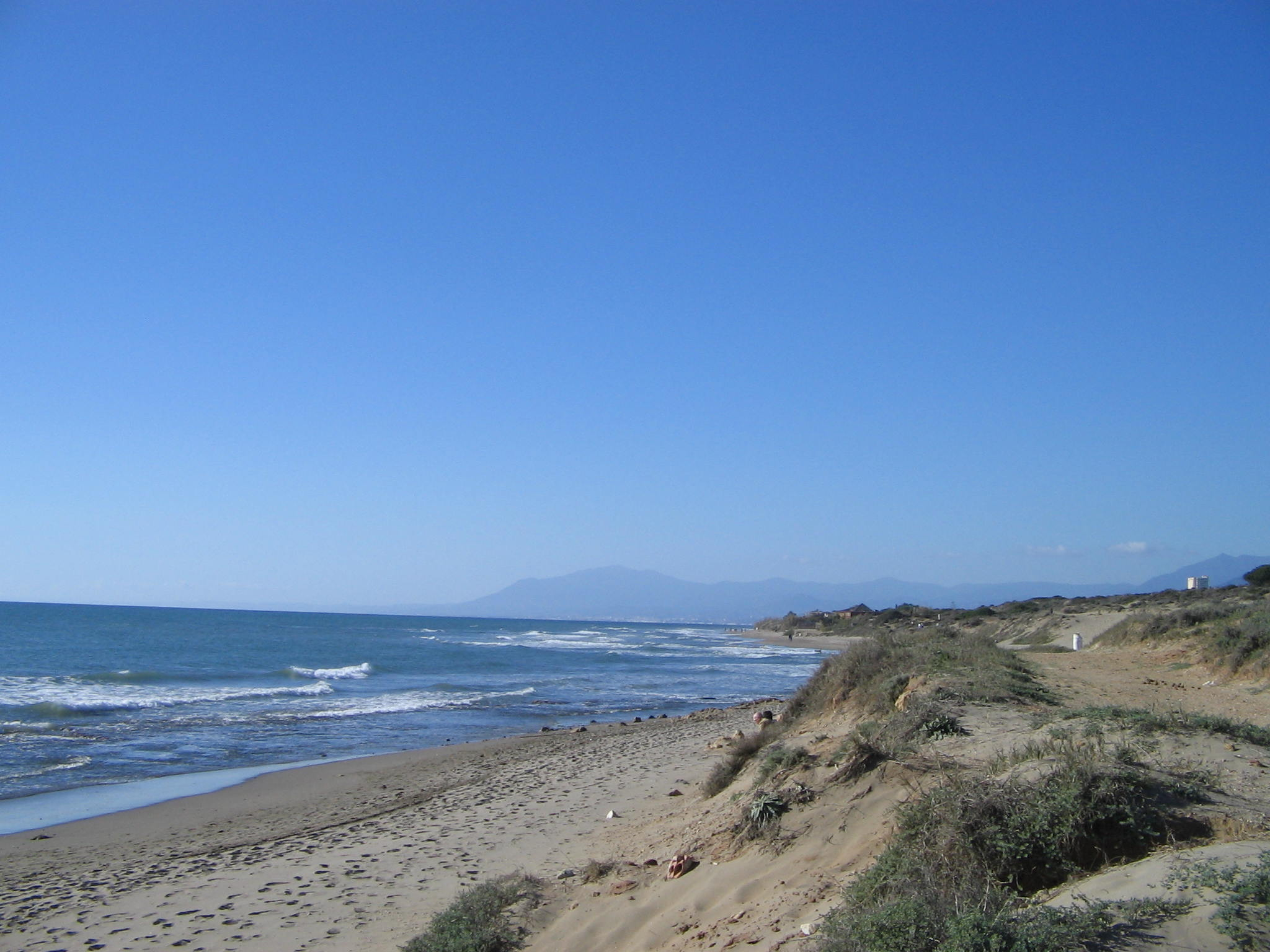
Dunes of Artola, the Sierra Blanca in the background

There are five geomorphological areas in Marbella—the Sierra Blanca, the Sierra Blanca piedmont (foothills), the lower hill country, the plains and the coastal dunes. The Sierra Blanca is the most centrally located in the province, peaking behind the old village. The mountain range has three notable peaks—La Concha, located further west at 1,215 m (3,986 feet) above sea level, Juanar Cross, located eastward (within the municipality of Ojen) at 1,178 m (3,865 feet) above sea level, and the highest, Mount Lastonar, located between the two at 1,270 m (4,170 feet). Marbella's topography is characterised by extensive coastal plains formed from eroded mountains. North of the plain is an area of around 100 and 400 m (330 and 1,300 feet) above sea level, encompassing low, rolling hills, with higher foothills and steeper slopes approaching the mountains behind. The coast is generally low-lying, with sandy beaches that are more extensive further east, between the fishing port and Cabopino. Despite the intense urbanisation of the coast, it still retains a natural area of dunes, the Artola Dunes (Dunas de Artola), at the eastern end of town.

=== Hydrography ===
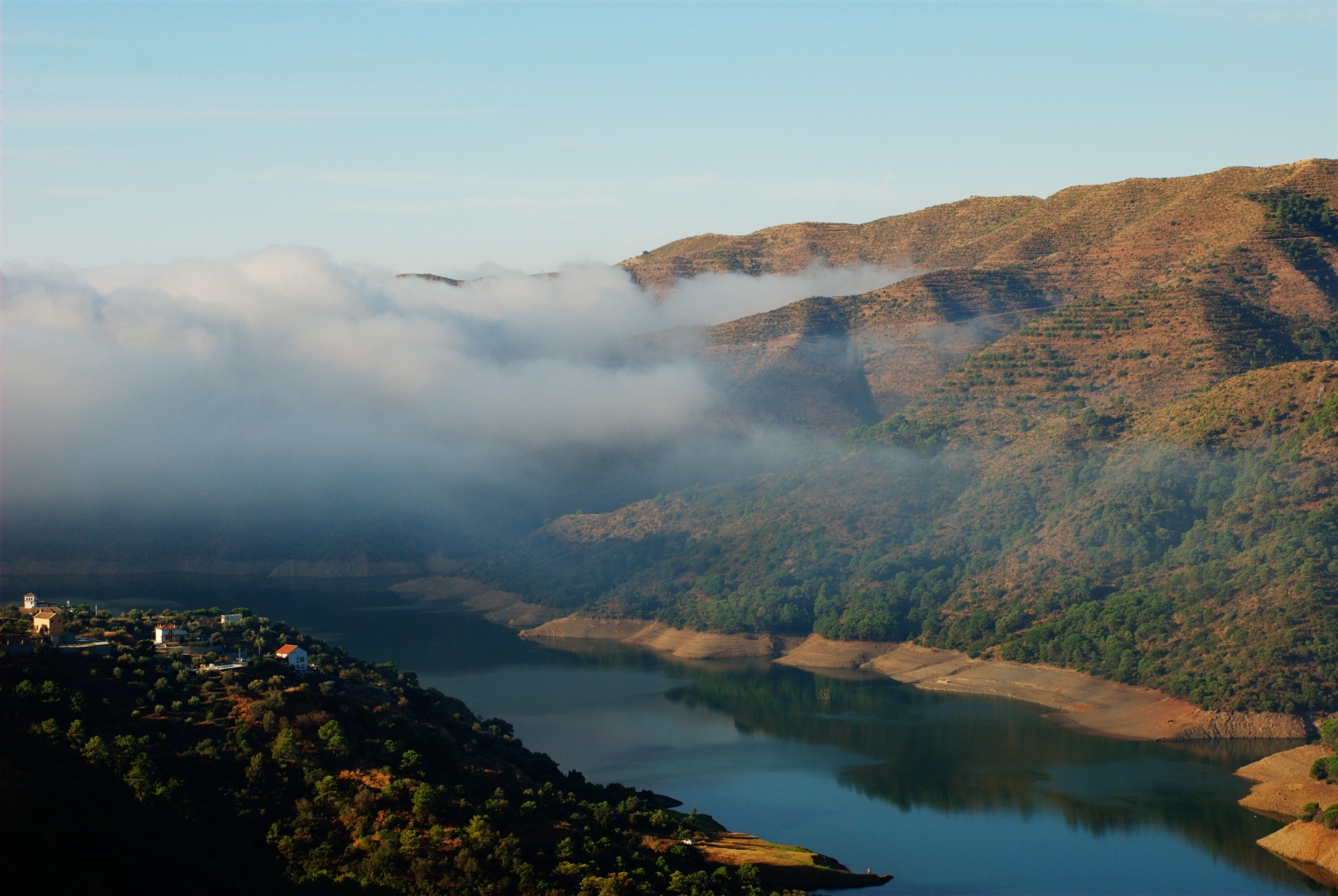
The La Concepción reservoir

The entire region lies within the Andalusian Mediterranean Basin. The rivers are short and have very steep banks, so that flash floods are common. These include the Guadalmina, the Guadaiza, the Verde and the Rio Real, which provide most of the water supply. The irregularity of rainfall has resulted in intermittent rivers that often run dry in summer; most of the many streams that cross the city have been bridged. The La Concepción reservoir supplies the population with drinking water—apart from this water feature, there are other reservoirs, like El Viejo and El Nuevo (the 'Old' and the 'New'), that irrigated the old agricultural colony of El Ángel. Additionally, Las Medranas and Llano de la Leche irrigated the plantations of the colony of San Pedro de Alcántara.

=== Climate ===
Marbella has a subtropical Mediterranean climate (Köppen: Csa) with humid, very mild winters (for European standards) and warm to hot, dry summers. Marbella is protected on its northern side by the coastal mountains of the Cordillera Penibética and so enjoys a climate with an average annual temperature between 18 and 19 °C (64 and 66 °F). During winters, the highest peaks of the nearby mountain range are occasionally covered with snow, which can be seen from the coastline of Marbella when it snows on the Sierra Blanca mountain peak at 1,275 m (4,183 ft). Average rainfall is 645.8 mm (25.43 in), while hours of sunshine average above 2,900 annually.

Climate data for Marbella, 1981–2010
Month	Jan	Feb	Mar	Apr	May	Jun	Jul	Aug	Sep	Oct	Nov	Dec	Year
Mean daily maximum °C (°F)	16.4 (61.5)	16.9 (62.4)	18.4 (65.1)	19.8 (67.6)	22.2 (72.0)	24.8 (76.6)	26.9 (80.4)	27.3 (81.1)	25.5 (77.9)	22.6 (72.7)	19.5 (67.1)	17.3 (63.1)	21.5 (70.6)
Daily mean °C (°F)	12.9 (55.2)	13.5 (56.3)	15.0 (59.0)	16.4 (61.5)	18.7 (65.7)	21.5 (70.7)	23.6 (74.5)	24.0 (75.2)	22.2 (72.0)	19.4 (66.9)	16.2 (61.2)	14.0 (57.2)	18.1 (64.6)
Mean daily minimum °C (°F)	9.4 (48.9)	10.0 (50.0)	11.6 (52.9)	12.9 (55.2)	15.1 (59.2)	18.2 (64.8)	20.3 (68.5)	20.6 (69.1)	18.9 (66.0)	16.2 (61.2)	12.9 (55.2)	10.7 (51.3)	14.7 (58.5)
Average precipitation mm (inches)	88.8 (3.50)	75.8 (2.98)	57.3 (2.26)	50.8 (2.00)	25.2 (0.99)	5.7 (0.22)	1.1 (0.04)	5.8 (0.23)	29.9 (1.18)	64.6 (2.54)	108.8 (4.28)	132.0 (5.20)	645.8 (25.42)
Average precipitation days (≥ 1 mm)	7.3	6.7	5.7	6.2	4.4	0.9	0.4	0.4	2.7	5.7	7.0	8.8	56.2
Source: World Meteorological Organization (WMO)

=== Flora and fauna ===
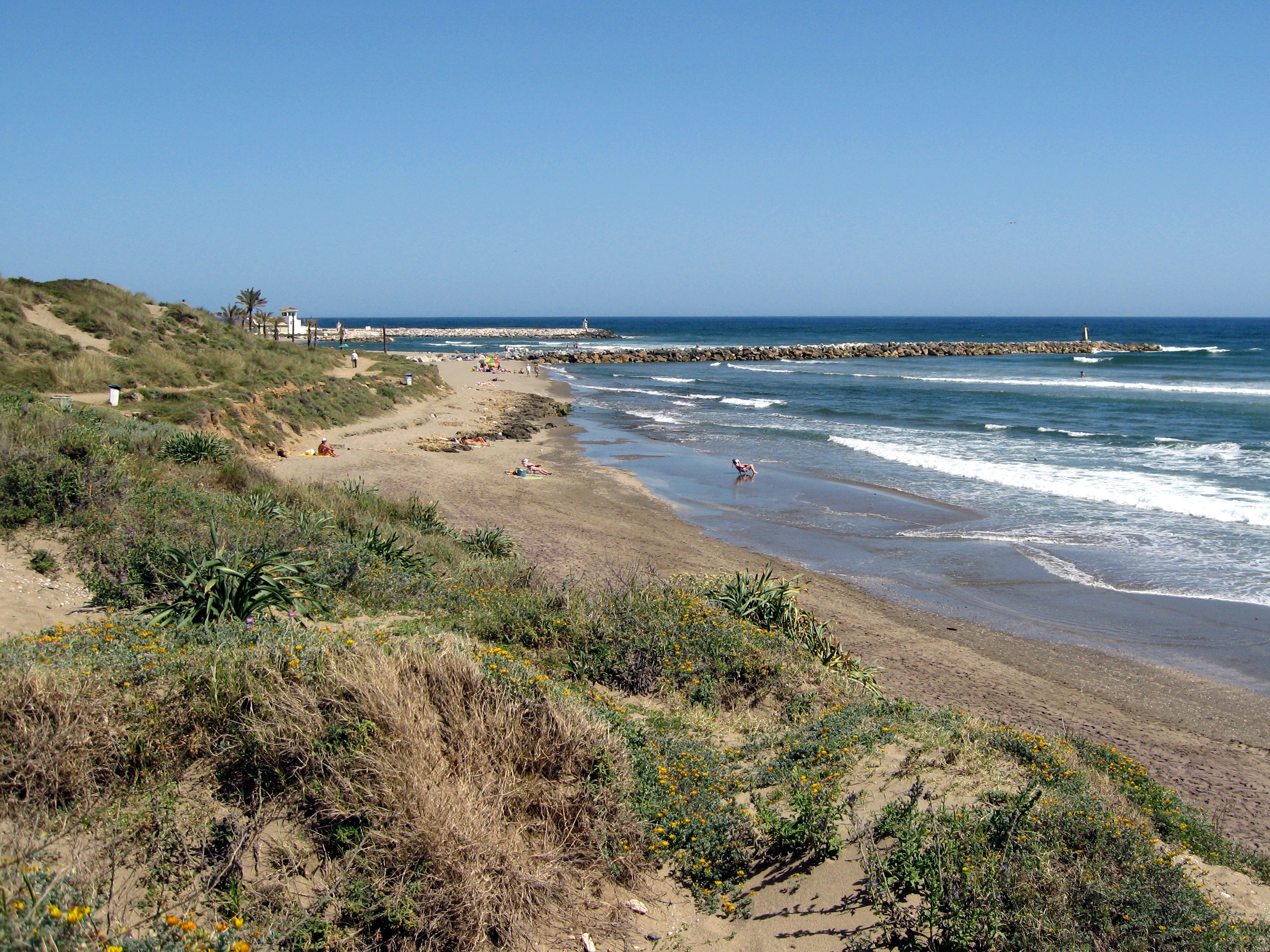
Playa de Cabopino (Cabopino beach) of the Dunas de Artola

As most of the montane and wilderness areas around Marbella are under the management and protection of the central government, a great biodiversity is still thriving, with numerous endemic trees and plants, including chestnut and cherry trees, fir trees, Aleppo, Monterrey and maritime pines, pinyons, and ferns. The fauna is rich, with nearly 300 observed species of birds, including large raptors such as the lammergeier, cinereous (black), Egyptian, and Eurasian and Rüppell's griffon vultures, osprey, booted, Bonelli's and golden eagles, as well as buzzards, goshawks, harriers, kites, sparrowhawks and snake-eagles; owls include the Eurasian eagle-owl, little owl, long-eared owl and the tawny owl. Over 50 species of sea and shorebirds can be seen, in addition to some 20-30 species of ducks, swans, geese and other waterfowl. Greater and (occasionally) lesser flamingoes may be observed. Around 40 different mammals, including Iberian ibex, the rare Iberian lynx, badger, red deer, fallow deer, roe deer, genets, hedgehogs, marbled polecat, red fox, river otter, stone marten and wild boar, in addition to free-ranging (some feral) groups of goats, horses, donkeys, cattle, and sheep, as well as potentially destructive feral dogs and cats. Around 50 reptiles and amphibians, and nearly 100 fish species, both marine and freshwater, can be found.

The coast has the Natural Monument site of the Dunas de Artola, one of the few protected natural beaches of the Costa del Sol, which contains marram grass, sea holly, sea daffodils and shrubs, such as large-fruited juniper. The Posidonia oceanica, endemic to the Mediterranean, is found in the Cabopino area, and is an important part of the marine ecosystem around Marbella.

== Demographics ==
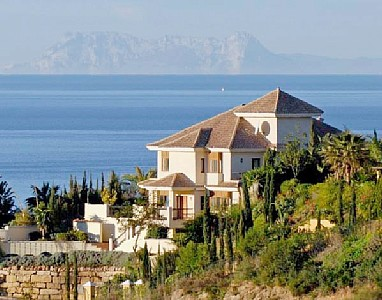
Marbella urbanisation: much of the population is dispersed in low density developments. Example here: Elviria

Historical population
Year	Pop.	±%
1842	5,105	—
1857	6,564	+28.6%
1877	7,666	+16.8%
1887	8,324	+8.6%
1900	9,075	+9.0%
1910	10,005	+10.2%
1920	9,962	−0.4%
1930	9,041	−9.2%
1940	9,159	+1.3%
1950	10,027	+9.5%
1960	12,156	+21.2%
1970	29,253	+140.6%
1981	60,172	+105.7%
1991	80,599	+33.9%
2001	100,036	+24.1%
2011	135,124	+35.1%
2021	149,032	+10.3%
Source: INE

According to the census of the INE for 2023, Marbella had a population of 156,295 inhabitants, which ranked it as the second-most populous city in the province of Málaga and eighth in Andalusia after surpassing Cádiz in 2008. Unlike other towns in the Costa del Sol, Marbella had a significant population before the population explosion caused by the tourist boom of the 1960s. The census counted about 10,000 people in 1950; population growth since has been as great as that of neighboring towns. Between 1950 and 2001 the population grew by 897%, with the decade of the 1960s having the highest relative increase, at 141%. In 2001, only 26.2% of Marbella's population had been born there, 15.9% were foreign-born, and those born in other towns in Spain made up the difference. During the summer months the population of Marbella increases by 30% with the arrival of tourists and foreigners who have their second homes in the area.

The population is concentrated in two main centres: Marbella and San Pedro Alcántara; the rest is scattered in many developments in the districts of Nueva Andalucia and Las Chapas, located along the coast and on the mountain slopes. According to a study by the Association of Municipalities of the Costa del Sol, based on the production of solid waste in 2003, Marbella had a population of about 246,000 inhabitants, almost twice that of the population census of 2008. From the estimated volume of municipal waste in 2010, the City calculates the population during the summer months at around 400,000 people, while official police sources estimated it at about 500,000, with a peak of up to 700,000 people.

=== Demonyms ===
Traditionally the people of Marbella have been called "marbelleros" in the local vernacular and "marbellenses" in more formal registers; these names have appeared in dictionaries and encyclopedias. Since the mid-1950s, however, Marbellan residents have been called "marbellís" or "marbellíes", the only gentilic, or demonym, that appears in the Diccionario de la Lengua Española (Dictionary of the Spanish Language) published by the Royal Spanish Academy.

The use of "marbellí" as a gentilic was popularised by the writer and journalist Víctor de la Serna (1896–1958), who wrote a series of documentary articles on "The Navy of Andalucía"; in his research he had come upon the Historia de Málaga y Su Provincia (History of Málaga and the Province) by Francisco Guillén Robles, who used the plural word "marbellíes" to designate the Muslim inhabitants of Marbella.

== History ==
=== Prehistory and antiquity ===
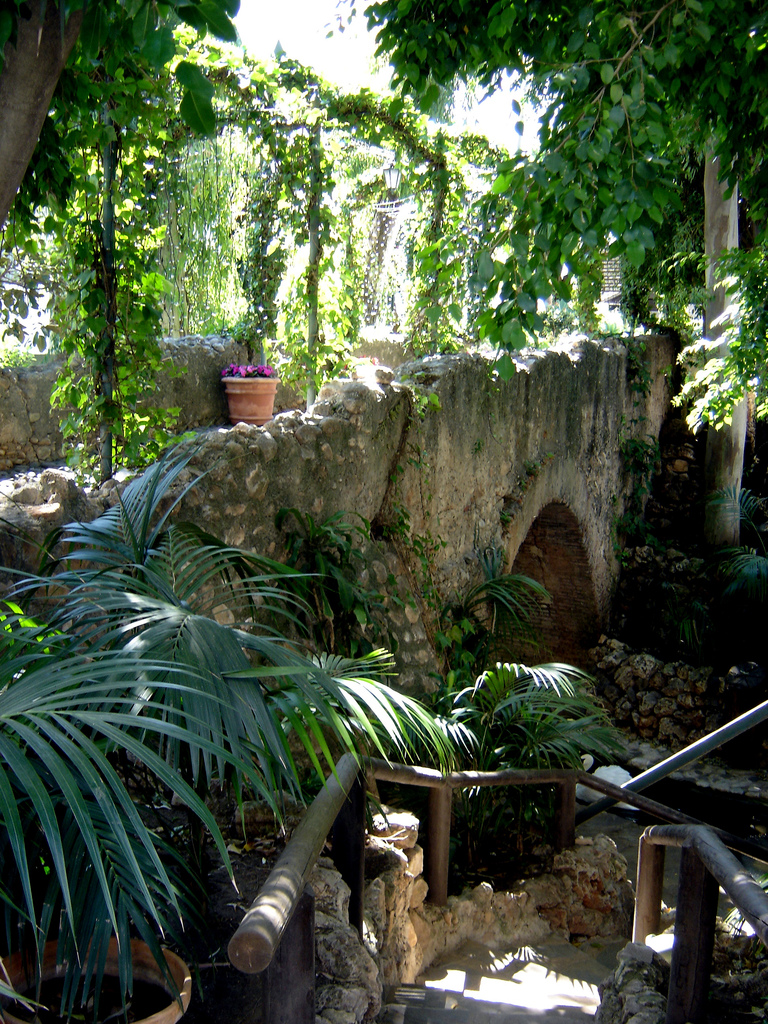
Remains of the Roman bridge of Marbella

Archaeological excavations have been made in the mountains around Marbella which point to human habitation in Paleolithic and Neolithic times. Some historians believe that the first settlement on the present site of Marbella was founded by the Phoenicians in the 7th century BC, as they are known to have established several colonies on the coast of Málaga province. However, no remains have been found of any significant settlement, although some artefacts of Phoenician and later Carthaginian settlements have been unearthed in different parts of the municipality, as in the fields of Rio Real and Cerro Torrón.

The existence of a Roman population centre in what is now the El Casco Antiguo (Old Town) is suggested by three Ionic capitals embedded in one section of the Murallas del Castillo (Moorish castle walls), that reused materials of a building from earlier times. Recent discoveries in La Calle Escuelas (School Street) and other remains scattered throughout the old town testify to a Roman occupation as well. West of the city, on the grounds of the Hotel Puente Romano, is a small 1st century Roman Bridge over a stream. There are ruins of other Roman settlements along the rivers Verde and Guadalmina: Villa Romana on the Rio Verde (Green River), the Roman baths at Guadalmina, and the ruins of a Roman villa and an early Byzantine basilica at Vega del Mar, built in the 3rd century and surrounded by a paleo-Christian necropolis, later used as a burial ground by the Visigoths. All of these further demonstrate a continued human presence in the area. In Roman times, the city was called Salduba (Salt City).

=== Middle Ages ===
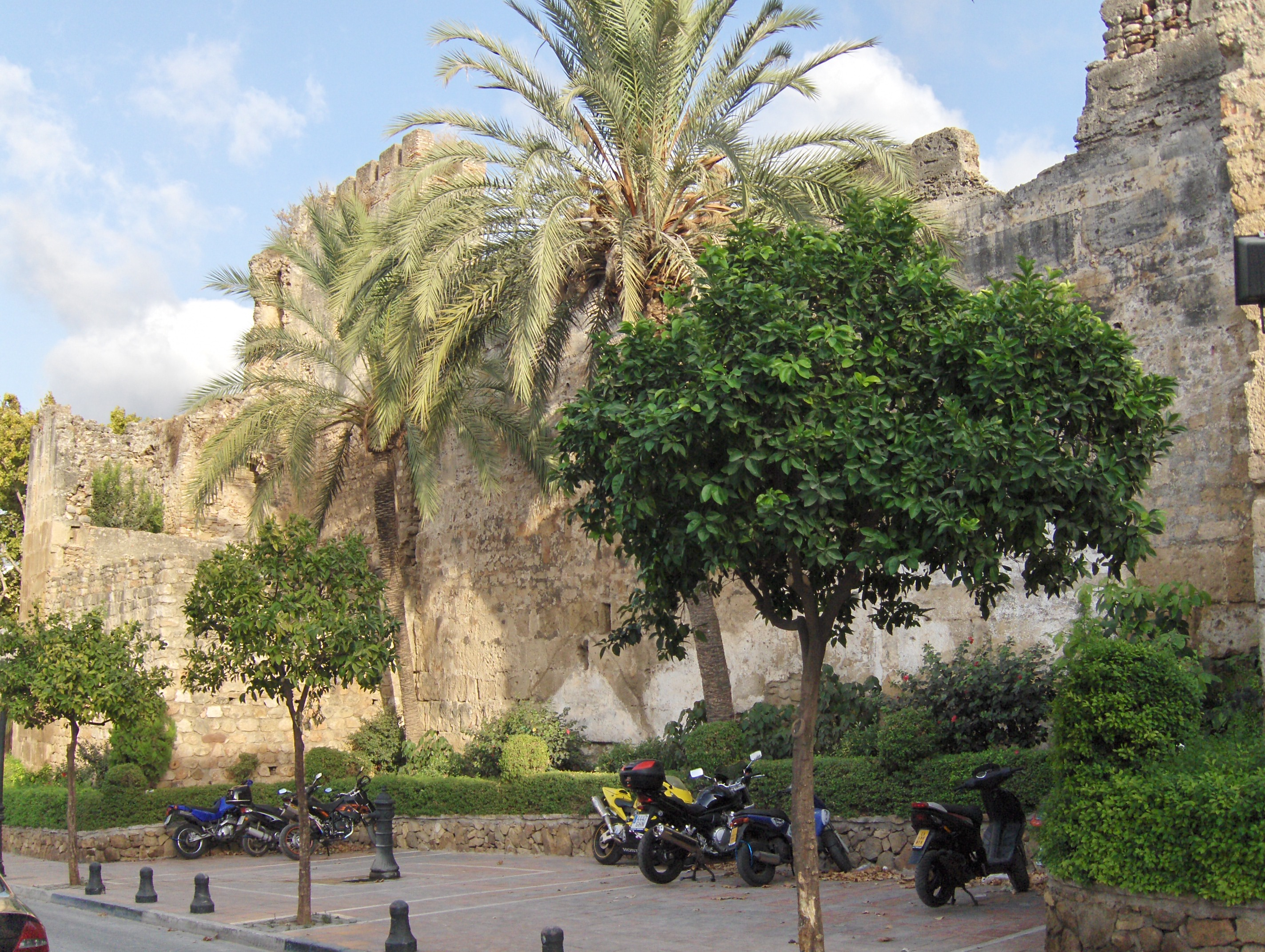
Moorish defensive walls of Marbella

During the period of Islamic rule, after the Normans lay waste to the coast of Málaga in the 10th century, the Caliphate of Córdoba fortified the coastline and built a string of several lighthouse towers along it. In the Umayyad fashion they constructed a citadel, the Alcazaba, and a wall to protect the town, which was made up of narrow streets and small buildings with large patios, the most notable buildings being the citadel and the mosque. The village was surrounded by orchards; its most notable crops were figs and mulberry trees for silkworm cultivation. The current name most likely developed from the name the Arabs gave it: Marbal·la (مربلة), which may in turn derive, according to some linguistic investigations, from a previous Iberian place name. The traveller Ibn Battuta characterised it as "a pretty little town in a fertile district." During the time of the first kingdoms of Taifa, Marbil-la was disputed by the Taifas of Algeciras and of Málaga, eventually falling into the orbit of Málaga, which in turn later became part of the Nasrid Kingdom. In 1283 the Marinid sultan Abu Yusuf Yaqub ibn Abd Al-Haqq launched a campaign against the Kingdom of Granada. Peace between the Marinid dynasty and the Nasrid dynasty was achieved with the signing of the Treaty of Marbella on 6 May 1286, by which all the Marinid possessions in Al-Andalus were restored to the Nasrid sultan.

=== Early modern era ===
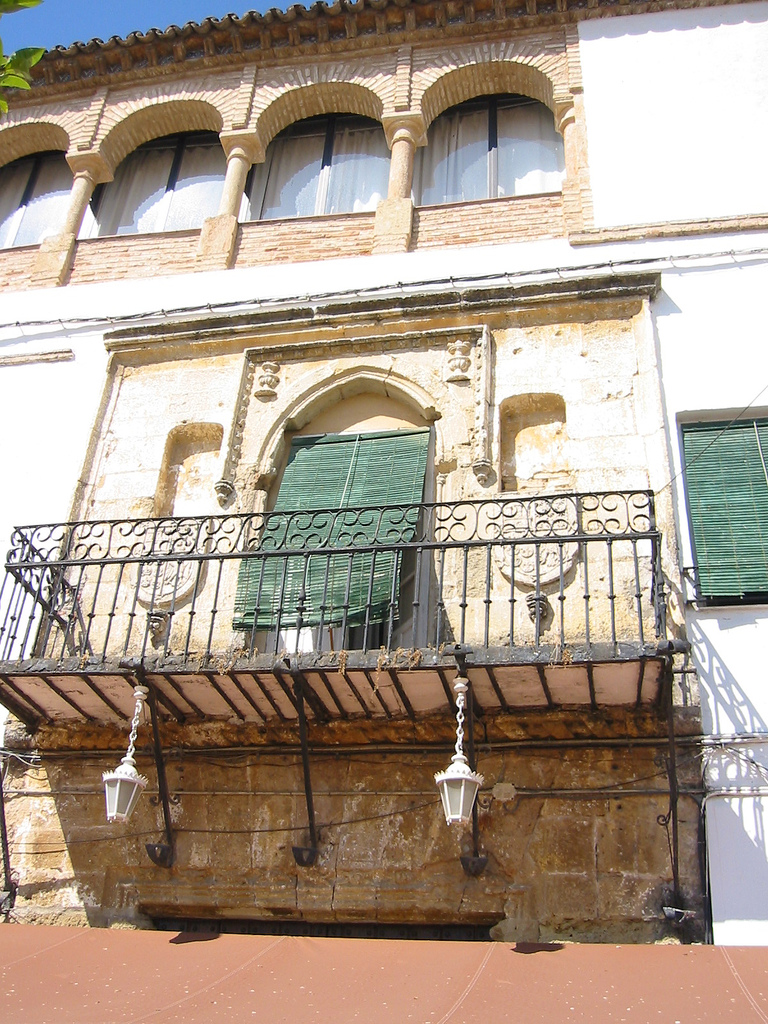
Partial view of the main façade of the Casa del Corregidor, built in the 16th century in the Plaza de los Naranjos

On 11 June 1485, the town passed into the hands of the Crown of Castile without bloodshed. The Catholic Monarchs gave Marbella the title of city and capital of the region and made it a realengo (royal protectorate). The Plaza de los Naranjos was built along the lines of Castilian urban design about this time, as well as some of the historical buildings that surround it. The Fuerte de San Luis de Marbella (Fort of San Luis) was built in 1554 by Charles V. The main door faced north and was protected by a moat with a drawbridge. Today, the ruins of the fort house a museum, and on the grounds are the Iglesia del Santo Cristo de la Vera Cruz (Church of the Holy Christ of the True Cross) and Ermita del Calvario (Calvary Chapel). Sugar cane was introduced to Marbella in 1644, the cultivation of which spread on the Málaga province coast, resulting in the construction of numerous sugar mills, such as Trapiche del Prado de Marbella.

=== 19th century ===
In 1828, the Málaga businessman Manuel Agustín Heredia founded a company called La Concepción to mine the magnetite iron ores of the Sierra Blanca at nearby Ojén, due to the availability of charcoal made from the trees of the mountain slopes and water from the river Verde, as a ready supply of both was needed for the manufacture of iron. In 1832 the company built the first charcoal-fired blast furnace for non-military use in Spain; these iron-smelting operations ultimately produced up to 75% of the country's cast iron. By 1860 competition from the coke-fired blast furnaces in northern Spain had made the plant uneconomical. In 1860 the 1st Marquess of Duero founded an agricultural colony for the unemployed iron workers, now the heart of San Pedro de Alcántara.

The simultaneous dismantling of the iron industry, based in the forges of El Angel and La Concepción, disrupted the local economy. Much of the population had to return to farming or fishing for a livelihood. The situation was compounded by the widespread crisis of traditional agriculture and by the epidemic of phylloxera blight in the vineyards, causing Marbella to suffer high unemployment, an increase in poverty, and the starvation of many day labourers.

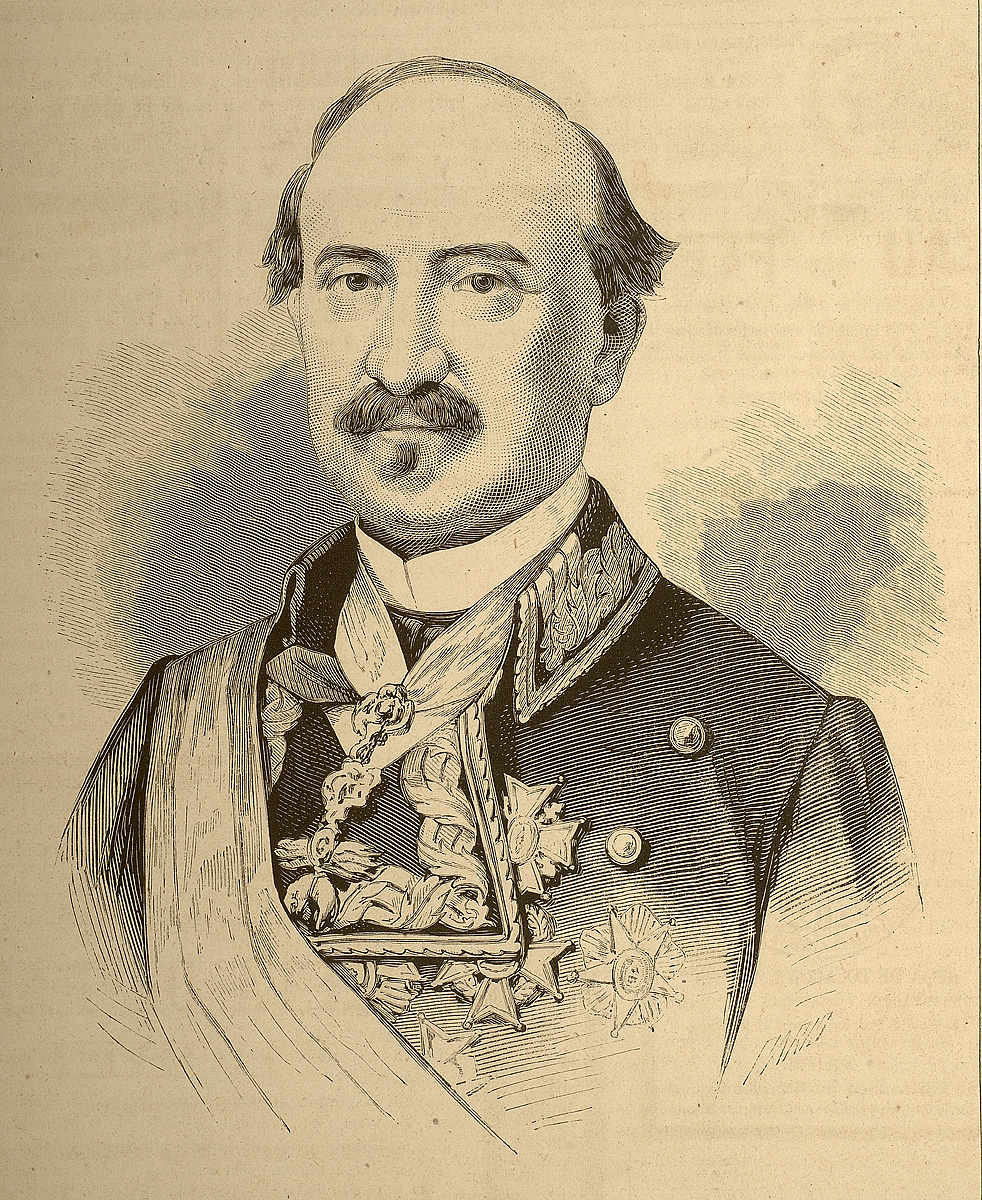
The Marquess of Duero

The associated infrastructure built for the installation of the foundry of El Angel in 1871 by the British-owned Marbella Iron Ore Company temporarily relieved the situation, and even made the city a destination for immigrants, increasing its population. However, the company did not survive the worldwide economic crisis of 1893, and closed its doors in that year due to the difficulty of finding a market for the magnetite iron ore it mined.

In the late 19th century, Marbella was a village composed of three parts: the main districts, the Barrio Alto or San Francisco, and the Barrio Nuevo. There were three smaller nuclei arranged around the old ironworks and the farm-model of the colony of San Pedro Alcántara, as well as isolated dwellings in orchards and farms. The general population was divided between a small group of oligarchs and the working people, the middle class being practically non-existent.

=== 20th century ===
In the early decades of the 20th century, the first hotels were built: El Comercial, which opened in 1918, and the Miramar, in 1926. During the Second Republic, Marbella experienced major social changes and contentious political parties mobilized.

As the Spanish Civil War began in the late 1930s, Marbella and Casare suffered more anticlerical violence than the rest of western Málaga province. The day after the failed uprising which led to the civil war, several religious buildings in Marbella were set on fire. Only the walls of the Church of St. Mary of the Incarnation and the Church of San Pedro Alcantara were left standing. With the aid of Fascist Italian troops, Nationalist forces seized Marbella during the first months of the war. It became a haven for prominent Nazis, including Léon Degrelle and Wolfgang Jugler, and Falangist personalities like José Antonio Girón de Velasco and José Banús.

After the Second World War, Marbella was a small jasmine-lined village with only 900 inhabitants. Ricardo Soriano, Marquis of Ivanrey, moved to Marbella and popularised it among his rich and famous friends. In 1943, he acquired a country estate located between Marbella and San Pedro called El Rodeo, and later built a resort there called Venta y Albergues El Rodeo, beginning the development of tourism in Marbella.

Soriano's nephew, Prince Alfonso of Hohenlohe-Langenburg, descendant of a high-ranking aristocratic family (his mother, María de la Piedad de Yturbe y Scholtz-Hersmendorff, was the Marquesa de Belvís de las Navas) acquired another estate, Finca Santa Margarita. In 1954, he opened the Marbella Club, an international resort aimed at movie stars, business executives and the nobility.

Both resorts came to be frequented by members of European aristocratic families with famous names: Bismarck, Rothschild, Thurn und Taxis, Metternich, de Mora y Aragon, de Salamanca or Thyssen-Bornemisza. This transformed Marbella into a destination for the international jet set. Trading on Prince Alfonso's kinship to the royal courts of Europe, his hotel quickly proved popular with vacationing members of Europe's social elites for its casual but discreet luxury. Jaime de Mora y Aragón, a Spanish bon vivant and brother to Fabiola, Queen of the Belgians, as well as Adnan Khashoggi, were frequent visitors. Prince Alfonso's first marriage was to Princess Ira von Fürstenberg, an Agnelli heiress. Princess Marie-Louise of Prussia (great-granddaughter of Kaiser Wilhelm II) and her husband Count Rudolf "Rudi" von Schönburg–Glauchau eventually worked closely with the new proprietors, the Shamoon family, who took over the Marbella Club Hotel from Prince Alfonso.

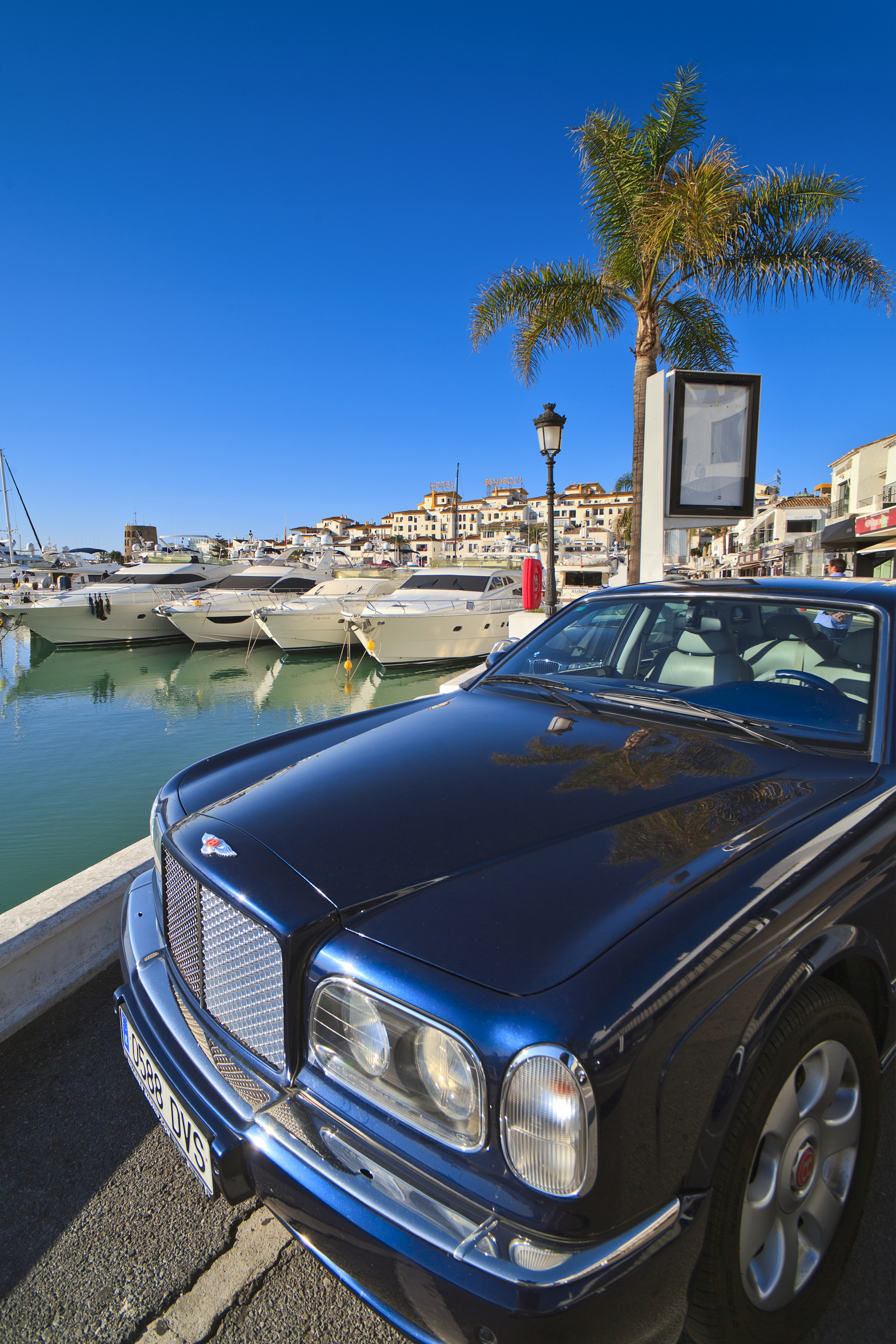
Luxury car parked in Puerto Banús

In 1966, Prince Alfonso hired a Beverly Hills architect and, with the assistance of the Banus family, who were personal friends of dictator Francisco Franco and had already developed the later-controversial Valle de los Caídos, developed the high-end tourist resort Puerto Banus. The resort opened to much fanfare in 1970. Celebrities in attendance included Franco's designated successor, Juan Carlos (then Prince of Asturias), Prince Rainier of Monaco and his wife Grace Kelly, and Aga Khan IV; entertainers included Julio Iglesias. In 1973, exiled dictator Fulgencio Batista y Zaldívar, who had left Cuba with a fortune estimated at between $100 and $300 million and lived extravagantly in various Iberian resorts, died of a heart attack there. Fugitive financier Marc Rich bought a house in Marbella, renounced his American citizenship and claimed Spanish citizenship during his decades of evading American income taxes, although he spent more time in Switzerland, where he died.

In 1974, Prince Fahd arrived in Marbella from Monte Carlo. Until his death in 2005, Prince Fahd was a frequent and profligate guest. Marbella welcomed his retinue of over a thousand people spending petro-dollars. The then-anonymous Osama bin Laden visited on a number of occasions with his family between 1977 and 1988.

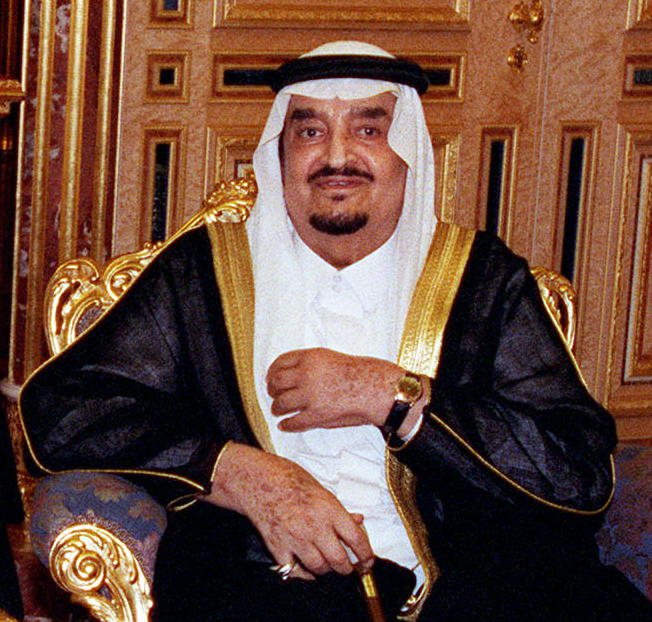
King Fahd of Saudi Arabia. His entourage used to spend up to €5 million a day in Marbella.

In the 1980s, Marbella continued as a popular jet set destination. However, the 1987 kidnapping of Melodie Nakachian, the daughter of local billionaire philanthropist Raymond Nakachian and the Korean singer Kimera, focused less-favourable international media scrutiny on Marbella, even though a police raid ultimately freed her.

From the first democratic elections after the adoption of the 1978 Spanish Constitution, until 1991, all the mayors of Marbella were members of the Spanish Socialist Workers Party ('El Partido Socialista Obrero Español' or PSOE in Spanish).

In 1991, the builder and president of Atlético Madrid, Jesús Gil was elected mayor of Marbella by a wide majority. He and his party, the right-wing populist Independent Liberal Group ('Grupo Independiente Liberal' or GIL in Spanish), promised to fight petty crime as well as the region's declining prestige. Actor Sean Connery became Marbella's international spokesman, although Connery later ended this business relationship after Gil used his image in an election campaign. Gil's administration facilitated a building boom. However, critics complained about disregard for the existing urban plan, market speculation and environmental predation by developers; the regional Andalusian government suspended some development. Gil despised town-hall formalities, instead ruling from his office at the Club Financiero, and cultivated a maverick image. The PSOE and the People's Party criticized Gil even at the national level, but voters re-elected him and some Spanish celebrities continued to spend summers there. Gil's political party, GIL, also proved popular in other tourist-dependent Costa del Sol towns like Estepona, and even across the Strait of Gibraltar to the Spanish North African cities of Ceuta and Melilla.

In 1999, Gil was convicted of embezzling public funds and falsifying public documents. Gil died in 2004, and his party remained in power until 2006, but related scandals continue to this day, as discussed below.

== Landmarks and places of interest ==
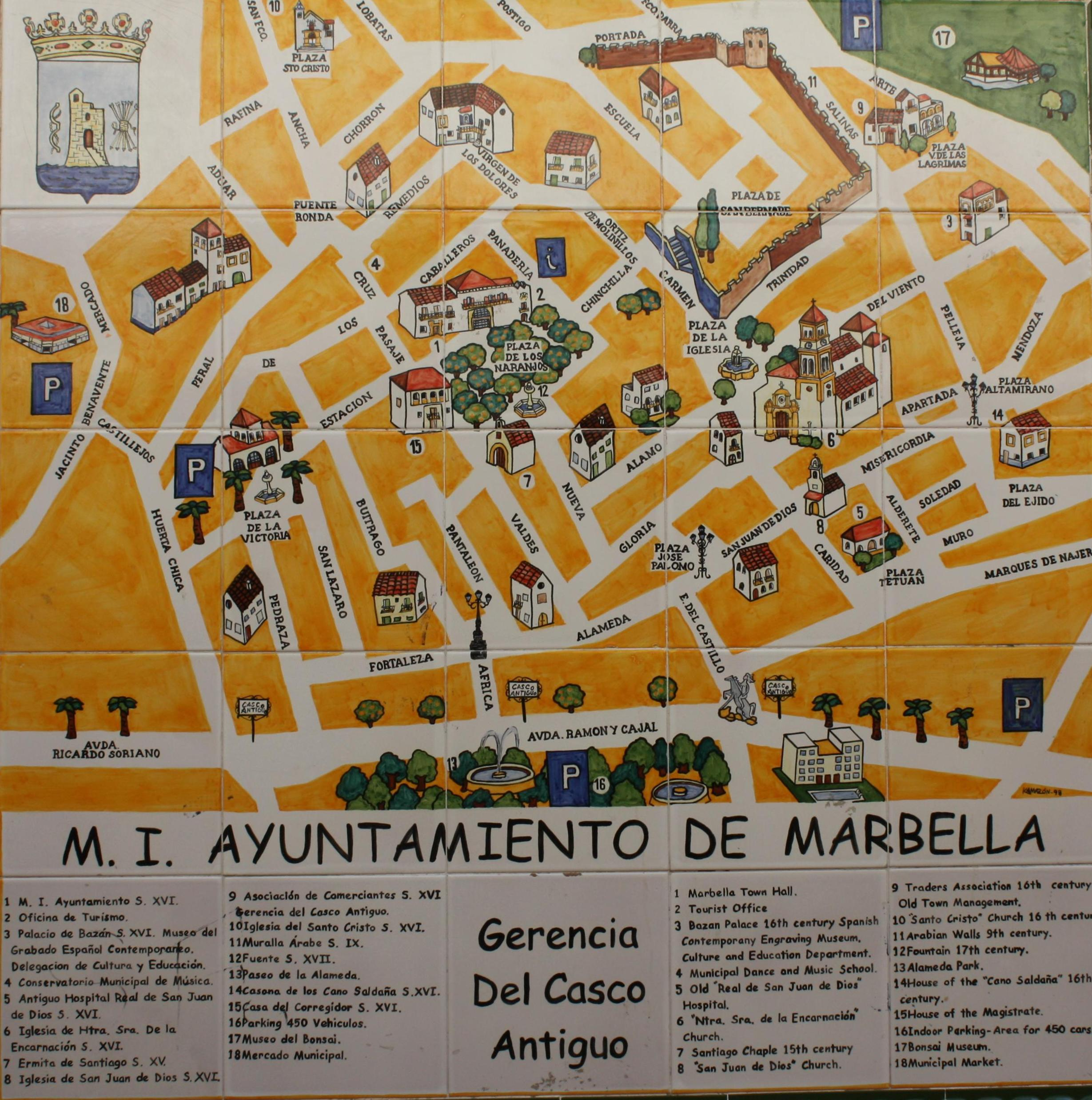
Map of the old town with its main buildings

=== Old Town (Casco Antiguo) ===
The old town of Marbella includes the ancient city walls and the two historical suburbs of the city, the Barrio Alto, which extends north, and the Barrio Nuevo, located to the east. The ancient walled city retains nearly the same layout as in the 16th century. Here is the Plaza de los Naranjos, an example of Castilian Renaissance design, its plan laid out in the heart of Old Town after the Christian reconquest. Around the square are arranged three remarkable buildings: the town hall, built in 1568 by the Catholic Monarchs in Renaissance style, the Mayor's house, which combines Gothic and Renaissance elements in its façade, with a roof of Mudejar style and fresco murals inside, and the Chapel of Santiago, the oldest religious building in the city, built earlier than the square and not aligned with it, believed to date from the 15th century. Other buildings of interest in the centre are the Church of Santa María de la Encarnación, built in the Baroque style starting in 1618, the Casa del Roque, and the remains of the Arabic castle and defensive walls; also in the Renaissance style are the Capilla de San Juan de Dios (Chapel of St. John of God), the Hospital Real de la Misericordia (Royal Hospital of Mercy) and the Hospital Bazán which now houses the Museum of Contemporary Spanish Engravings.

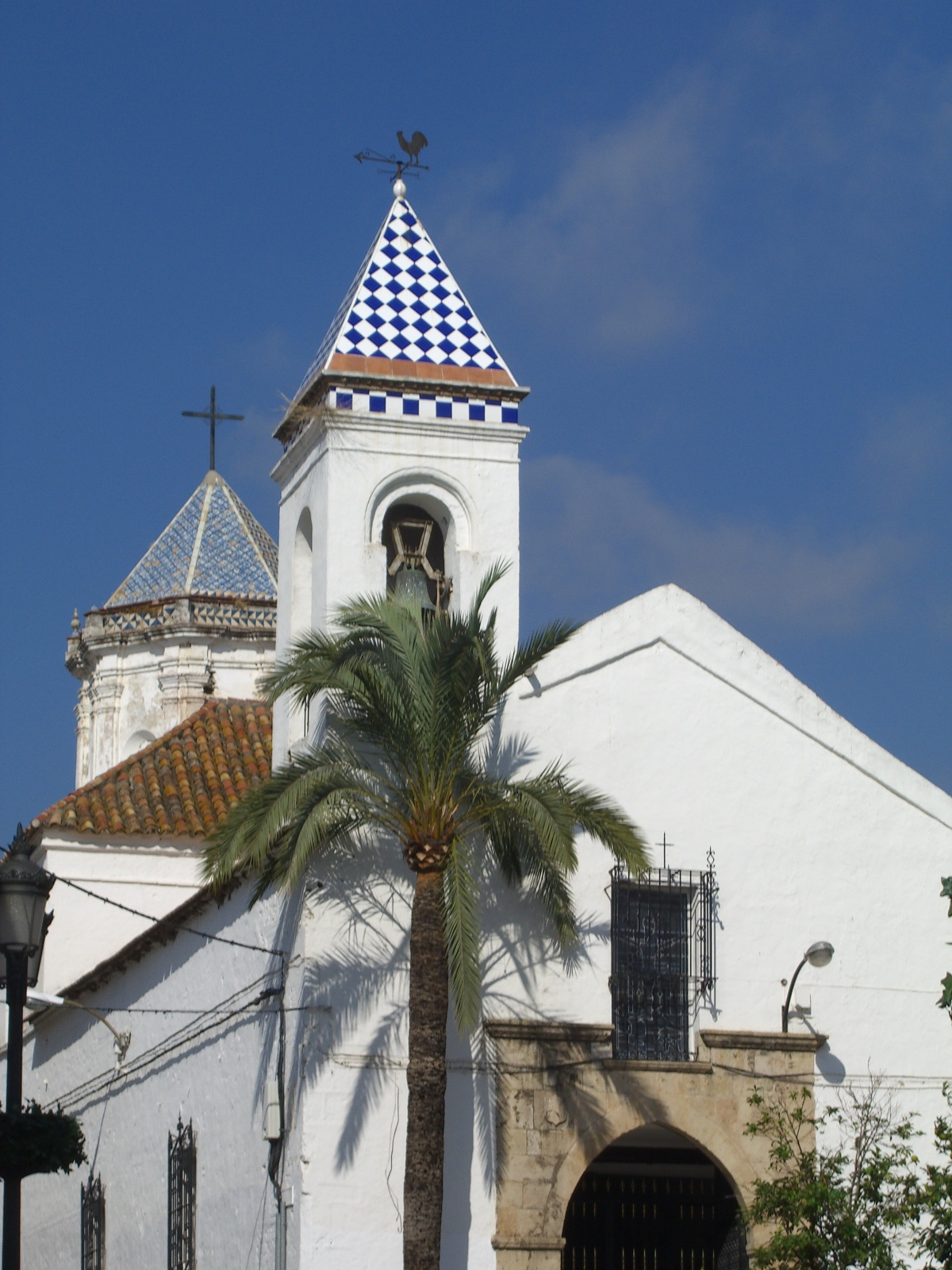
Ermita del Santo Cristo

One of the highlights of the Barrio Alto is the Ermita del Santo Cristo de la Vera Cruz (Hermitage of the Holy Christ of the True Cross), built in the 15th century and enlarged in the 18th century, which consists of a square tower with a roof covered by glazed ceramic tiles. The Barrio Alto is also known as the San Francisco neighborhood, after a Franciscan convent formerly located there. The so-called Nuevo Barrio (New Town), separated from the walled city by the Arroyo de la Represa, has no monumental buildings but retains its original layout and much of its character in the simple whitewashed houses with their tiled roofs and exposed wooden beams, orchards and small corrals.

=== Historic extension (Ensanche histórico) ===
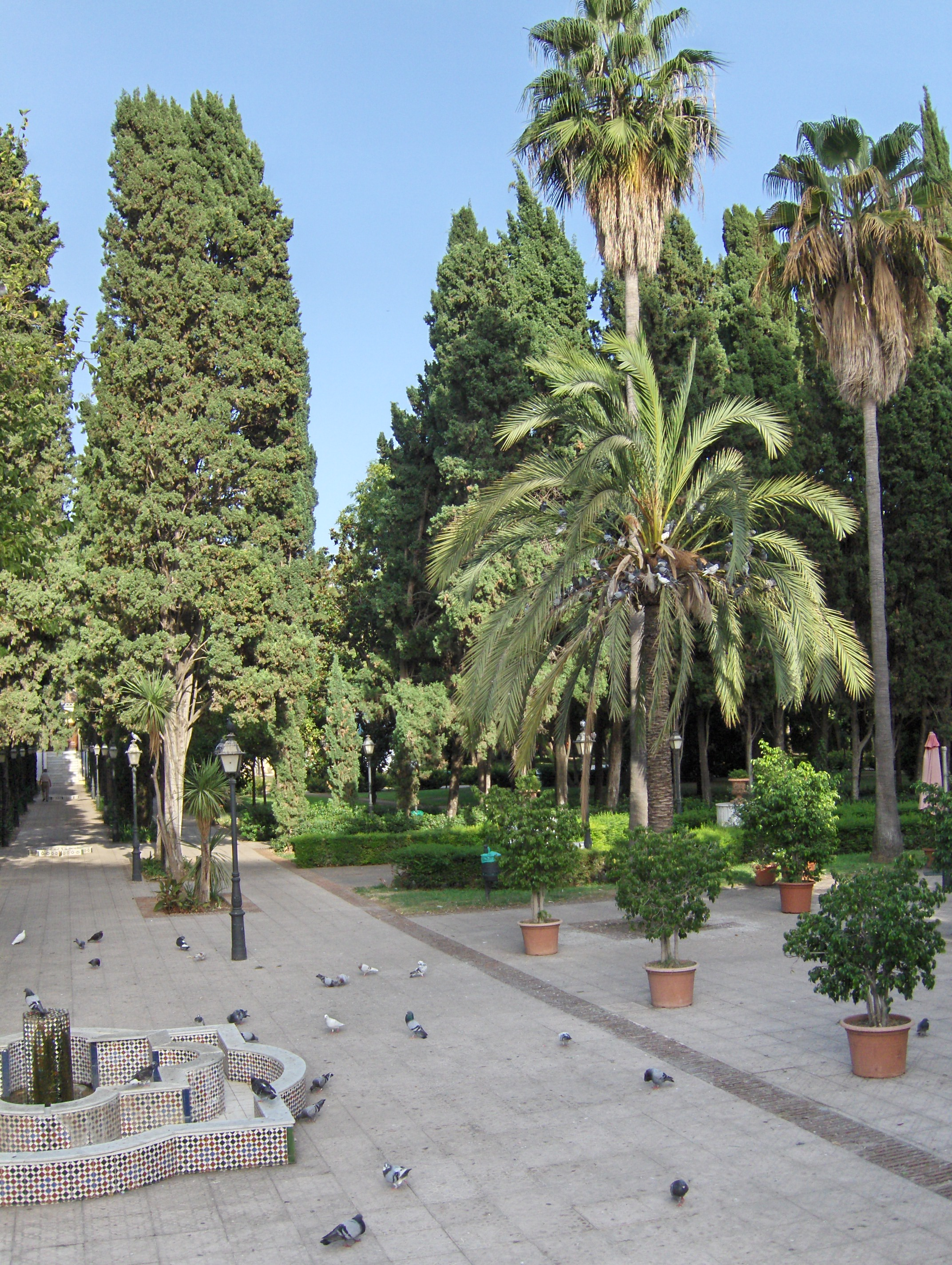
Constitution Park

Between the old town and the sea in the area known as the "historic extension" (ensanche histórico), there is a small botanical garden on Paseo de la Alameda, and a garden with fountains and a collection of ten sculptures by Salvador Dalí on the Avenida del Mar, which connects the old town with the beach. To the west of this road, passing the Faro de Marbella, is Constitution Park (Parque de la Constitución), which houses the auditorium of the same name and the Skol Apartments, designed in the Modernist style by the Spanish architect Manuel Jaén Albaitero.

=== Golden Mile ===
What is known as Marbella's Golden Mile is actually a stretch of four miles or 6.4 km which begins at the western edge of Marbella city and stretches to Puerto Banús. The area is home to some of Marbella's most luxurious villas and estates with views of mountain and sea, such as the Palace of King Fahd, as well as some landmark hotels, among them the Melia Don Pepe, the Hotel Marbella Club and the Hotel Puente Romano. The area developed during the tourism boom of the 1960s, where may be found the ruins of the Roman villa by the Rio Verde, and El Ángel, where the land of the old forge works was converted to an agricultural colony, and the Botanical Gardens of El Ángel with gardens of three different styles, dating from the 8th century.

The Golden Mile is divided into two parts by a motorway that runs through it. Along the motorway are strings of business centres, five-star hotels, golf course and other services. The beachside of the motorway is fully developed, while the mountain side is still undergoing development. Urbanisations in the area's sea side are Alhambra del Mar, La Alcazaba, Las Torres, Los Verdiales, Marbellamar, Marina Marbella, Oasis, Rio Verde and Santa Margarita. On the mountainside of the motorway, the following residential areas are currently being developed: Sierra Blanca, Nagüeles, Cascada de Camoján, Jardines Colgantes, Marbella Hill Club, El Venero, El Batatal, La Capellania, La Virginia, Carolina, El Vicario, Altos de Salamanca, Casas del Señorio de Marbella, Coto Real, and Ancon Sierra.

The Golden Mile should not be confused with the New Golden Mile which is a marketing name given to the area between San Pedro de Alcantara and Estepona.

=== Nueva Andalucía ===
Nueva Andalucía is an area just west of Marbella and inland from the marina of Puerto Banús. Home to many golf courses, it is also known as Golf Valley. The bullring by Centro Plaza marks the entrance to Nueva Andalucia where the villas and apartments are based on traditional Andalusian architecture and design. Nueva Andalucia is a very popular residential area both due to its three golf courses, but also due to an increasing number of restaurants and entertainment venues.

=== San Pedro Alcántara ===
At the heart of San Pedro Alcántara are two industrial buildings of the 19th century: the Trapiche de Guadaiza and the sugar mill, which now houses the Ingenio Cultural Centre. The 19th century heritage of San Pedro is also represented by two buildings of colonial style, the parish Church and the Villa of San Luis, residence of the Marqués del Duero. Next to San Pedro, near the mouth of the river Guadalmina, are some of the most important archaeological sites in Marbella: the early Christian Basílica de Vega del Mar, the vaulted Roman baths of Las Bóvedas (the Domes) and the eponymous watch tower of Torre de Las Bóvedas. The important archaeological site of Cerro Colorado is located near Benahavis; it features a chronologically complex stratigraphy that begins in the 4th century BC within a Mastieno (ancient Iberian ethnicity of the Tartessian confederation) area, then a town identified as Punic, and finally a Roman settlement. A series of domestic structures built behind the city walls, and corresponding to these different stages of occupation recorded in the archaeological sequence of the site, characterise the settlement as being fortified. A hoard of three pots filled with silver coins of mostly Hispano-Carthaginian origin, and numerous pieces of precious metalwork, along with clippings and silver ingots, all dating from the 3rd century BC, were found here.

=== District of Las Chapas ===
In the eastern part of the municipality in the district of Las Chapas is the site of Rio Real, situated on a promontory near the mouth of the river of the same name. Here traces of Phoenician habitation dating to the early 7th century BC were discovered in excavations made during an archaeological expedition led by Pedro Sánchez in 1998. Bronze Age utensils including plates, carinated bowls, lamps and other ceramics of Phoenician and indigenous Iberian types have been found, as well as a few Greek examples. There are two ancient watchtowers, the Torre Río Real (Royal River Tower) and the Torre Ladrones (Tower of Thieves). Among the notable tourist attractions is the residential complex Ciudad Residencial Tiempo Libre (Residential Leisure City), an architectural ensemble of the Modernist movement, which has been a registered property of Bien de Interés Cultural (Heritage of Cultural Interest) since 2006.

=== Beaches ===
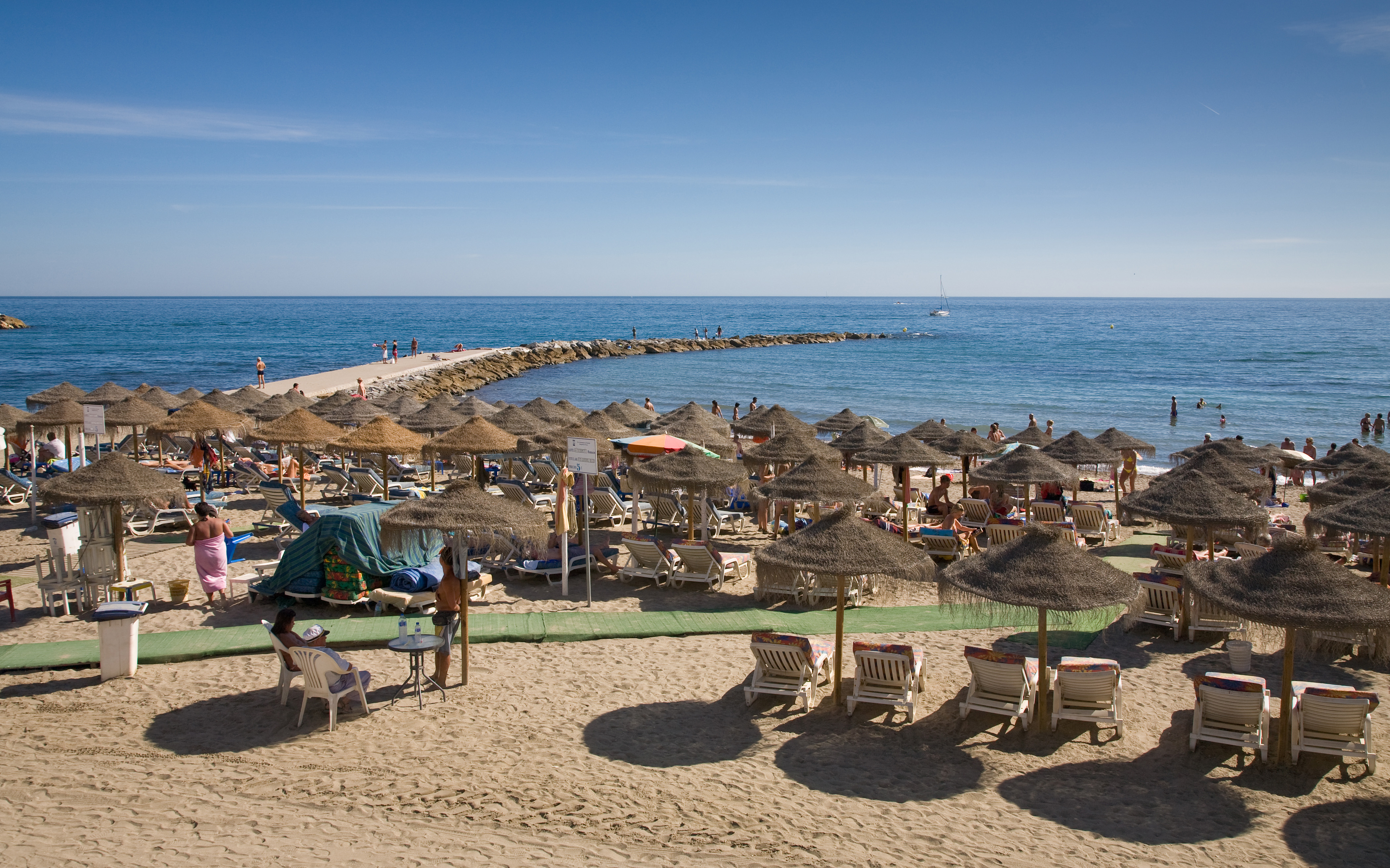
The beach-front in Marbella

The 27 kilometres (17 miles) of coastline within the limits of Marbella is divided into twenty-four beaches with different features; however, due to expansion of the municipality, they are all now semi-urban. They generally have moderate surf, golden or dark sand ranging through fine, medium or coarse in texture, and some gravel. The occupancy rate is usually high to midrange, especially during the summer months, when tourist arrivals are highest. Amongst the various notable beaches are Artola beach, situated in the protected area of the Dunas de Artola, and Cabopino, one of the few nudist beaches in Marbella, near the port of Cabopino. The beaches of Venus and La Fontanilla are centrally located and very popular, and those of Puerto Banús and San Pedro Alcántara have been awarded the blue flag of the Foundation for Environmental Education for compliance with its standards of water quality, safety, general services and environmental management.

== Politics and administration ==
Political administration of the municipal government is run by the Ayuntamiento (City Hall), whose members are elected every four years. Ángeles Muñoz, leader of the People's Party (PP) in Marbella, became mayor in 2007, and her party has governed the town ever since, apart from 2015 to 2017. The electoral roll is composed of all residents registered in Marbella who are over age 18 and a citizen of Spain or one of the other member states of the European Union. The Spanish Law on the General Election sets the number of councilors elected according to the municipality's population; the Municipal Corporation of Marbella consists of 27 councilors.

=== Gil Cases ===
Corruption accusations and mayor Gil's further conviction in 2002 for diverting public funds to Atlético led to reappraisal of the city's finances. When Jesús Gil y Gil finally resigned that year, he was succeeded by Julián Muñoz, his right-hand man, a former waiter famous for his romantic involvement with singer Isabel Pantoja, a matador's widow. After a power struggle in which Muñoz fired Juan Antonio Roca Nicolas, a planning consultant, for involvement in the Gil-era scandal and in the later scandal discussed below, the city council censured the new mayor and expelled him from office. More than 79 companies and 85 individuals were implicated in the initial corruption scandal (for which Roca had been released from prison upon paying a 450,000 euro fine), and an additional fifty persons and more companies were convicted in June 2013. In a televised debate, Muñoz and Gil each accused the other of having robbed public funds.

After his own party repudiated Muñoz, Marisol Yagüe, a former secretary, became Marbella's new mayor, but was herself arrested and jailed in March 2006. Deputy Mayor Isabel Garcia Marcos was arrested at Malaga's airport en route to a honeymoon in Russia at this time, and police found over €360,000 in cash in a safe in her home. Garcia, a Socialist until her expulsion from that party in 2003, had been known for criticizing Marbella's endemic corruption. Gil died in 2004, a year after Spain's Supreme Court barred him from holding further public office for 28 years for breach of trust and influence-peddling in the earlier cases, as well as shortly after a lower court ordered him to surrender his Atlético shares and fined him $16 million in connection with the 2002 conviction (but allowed him to remain free on bail during his appeal).

=== Operation Malaya ===
In March 2006, Marbella seemed nearly bankrupt. City councilor Tomás Reñones, a former Atlético Madrid football player, ran Marbella after Mayor Yague and Deputy Mayor Garcia were jailed, but soon ended up in jail as well. On 8 April 2006, the Spanish Senate unanimously approved the report of the General Commission of Autonomous Communities and suspended the city council, the first time such a course of action had occurred in Spain since democracy's restoration. Spain's Prime Minister, José Luis Rodríguez Zapatero, head of the national PSOE, appointed a committee of auditors to run Marbella temporarily, as well as unravel the financial machinations.

After a short period of interim government, municipal elections were held in May 2007. For the first time, the People's Party (PP) gained a majority, with 16 out of the 27 council seats. The PSOE won 10 council seats, United Left (IU) had 1. In the municipal elections of May 2011, the PP won 15 seats, the PSOE 7, the IU 2, and independents 3.

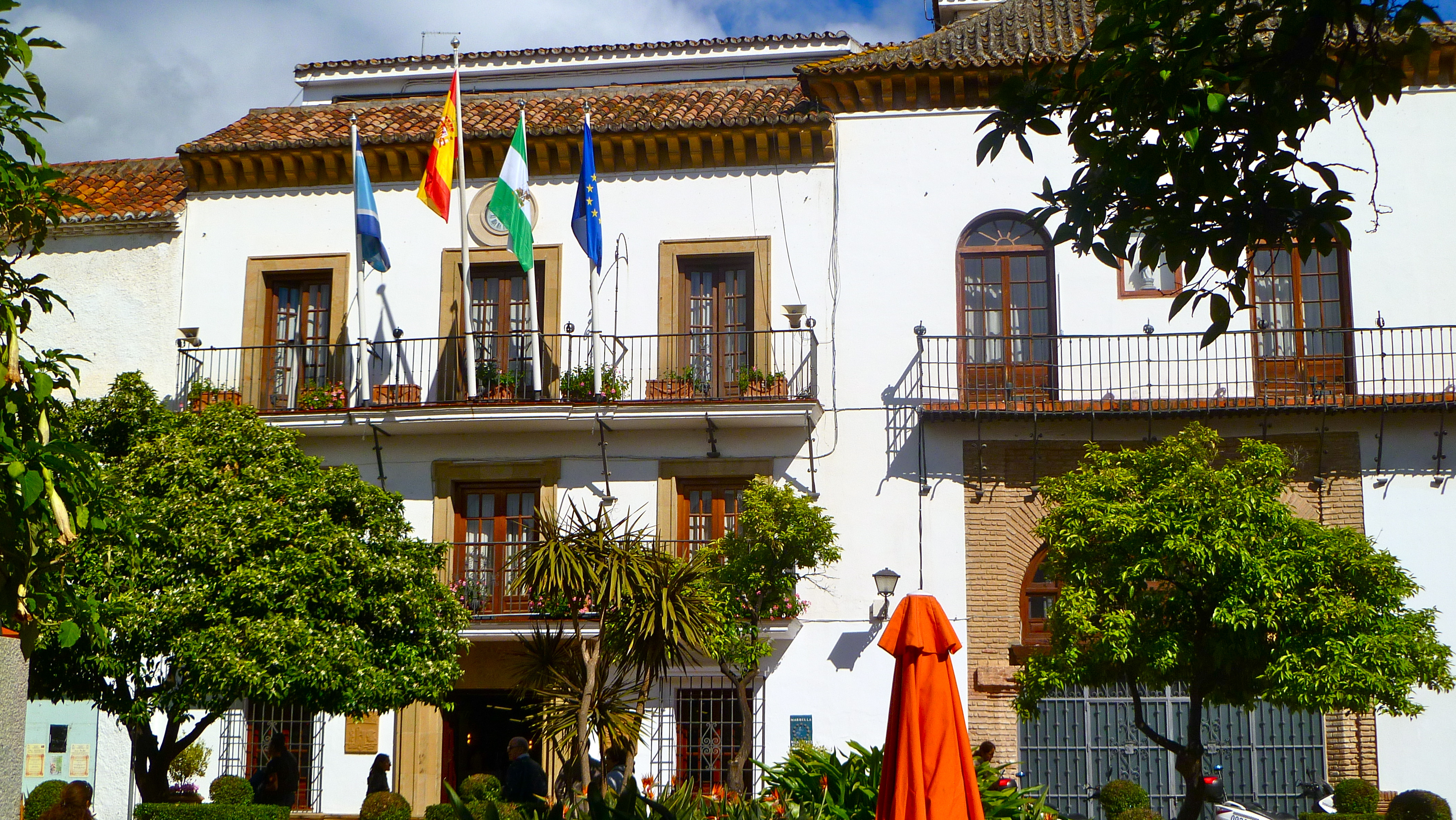
City Hall in Plaza de los Naranjos

The investigation, known as the Operation Malaya case, has resulted in numerous convictions and the seizure of goods worth €2.4 million. Today "Marbellan urbanism" is synonymous in Spain with governmental corruption, with as many as 30,000 illegal homes built in the town, without significant educational and health infrastructure.

During the complex, three-year trial (which included over 300 hours of hearings and 400 witnesses), evidence showed that under a scheme masterminded by Roca (a formerly unemployed builder who ran the city's planning department in the 1990s), building permits were issued in exchange for envelopes of cash, and the money then illegally laundered. Although prosecutors had sought even stiffer terms after convicting 50 municipal officials and business executives, in October 2013, Roca was sentenced to 11 years in jail and fined €240m, former mayor Muñoz sentenced to six years, and former mayor Yagüe sentenced to serve two years in prison. Forty of the 95 accused were found not guilty by the Malaga court.

The corruption investigation that led to this round of convictions began in 2005, as an investigation into drug moneylaundering. Roca reportedly claimed to control the town after Gil's death. At the height of his wealth he was one of the richest men in Andalucia, having accumulated several hotels, ranches with more than 103 thoroughbred horses and fighting bulls, a private jet, a helicopter, 14 vintage cars, 5 kilos of jewellery and a 275 piece art collection including Miro paintings. However, although Marbella's population had boomed to approximately 160,000 residents during the previous fifteen years, neither additional schools nor health centres were built; the city's infrastructure remained virtually unchanged since 1991. Although the city expanded its workforce from 400 employees in 1991 to 3,200 in 2006, under the GIL administrations Marbella paid neither social security contributions nor taxes for its employees. The town's debt now exceeds over €200 million and precludes necessary infrastructure improvements. Hundreds of the poorly built apartments and homes, many sold to expatriate British and Irish retirees, face demolition as hazardous. Investigating magistrate Miguel Angel Torres Segura, who led the investigations through 2007, was promoted to the criminal court in Granada.

=== Symbols ===
The design of the coat of arms and the flag used by Marbella City Hall has been the subject of controversy.

== Economy ==
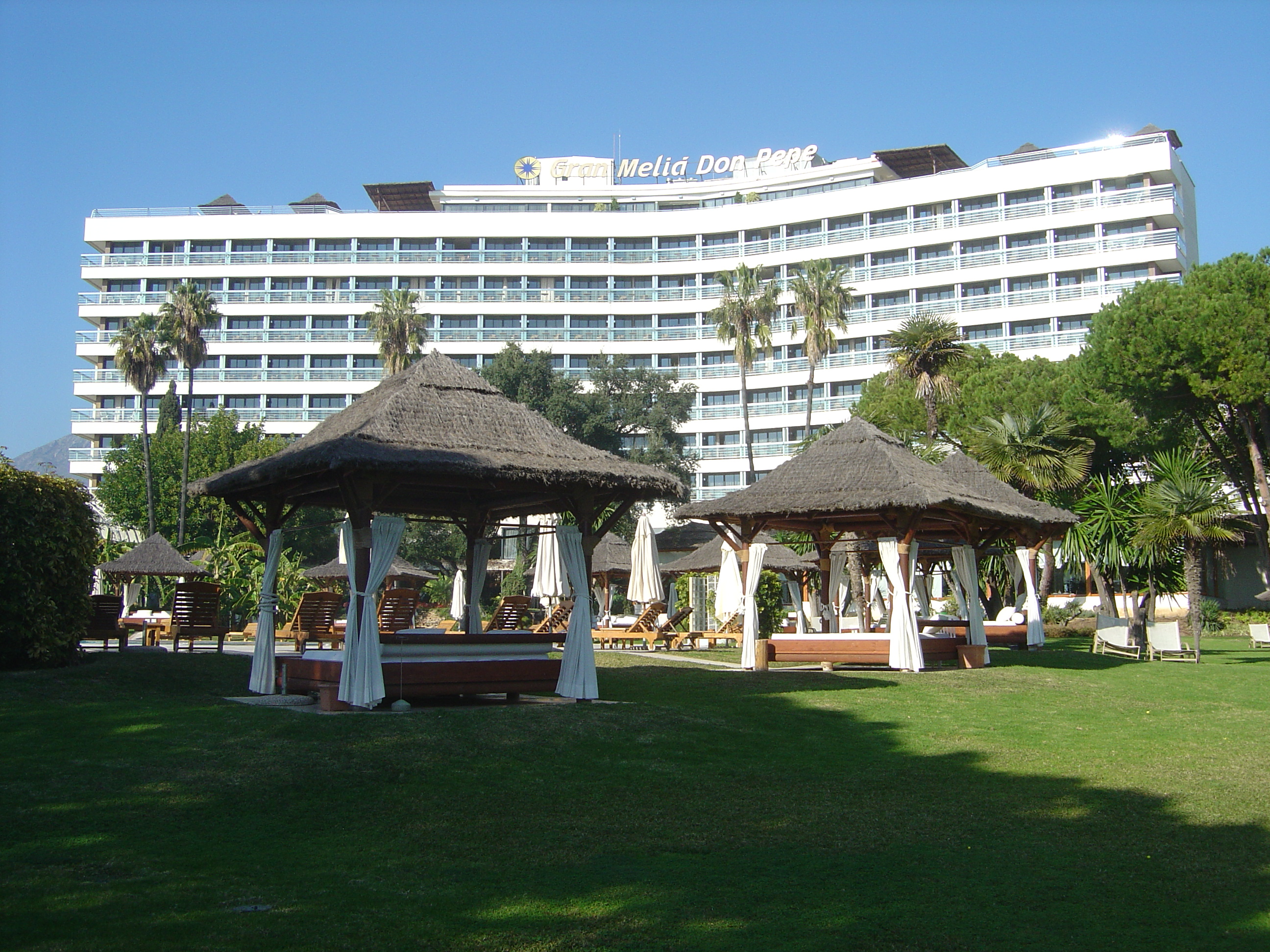
Hotel Don Pepe, designed by Eleuterio Población, opened in 1963

According to 2003 data, Marbella is amongst the municipalities ranking highest in household disposable income per capita in Andalusia, second to Mojácar and matched by four other municipalities, including its neighbour, Benahavís.

Its business sector consisted of 17,647 establishments in 2005, representing a total of 14.7% of the businesses in Malaga province, and showed greater dynamism than the provincial capital itself for growth over the period 1998–2004, when it grew 9% compared to the 2.4% growth rate of Málaga. Compared to the rest of Andalusia, the volume of production in Marbella is higher than that of most other municipalities with similar population, ranking even above the capitals of Almería, Huelva and Jaén.

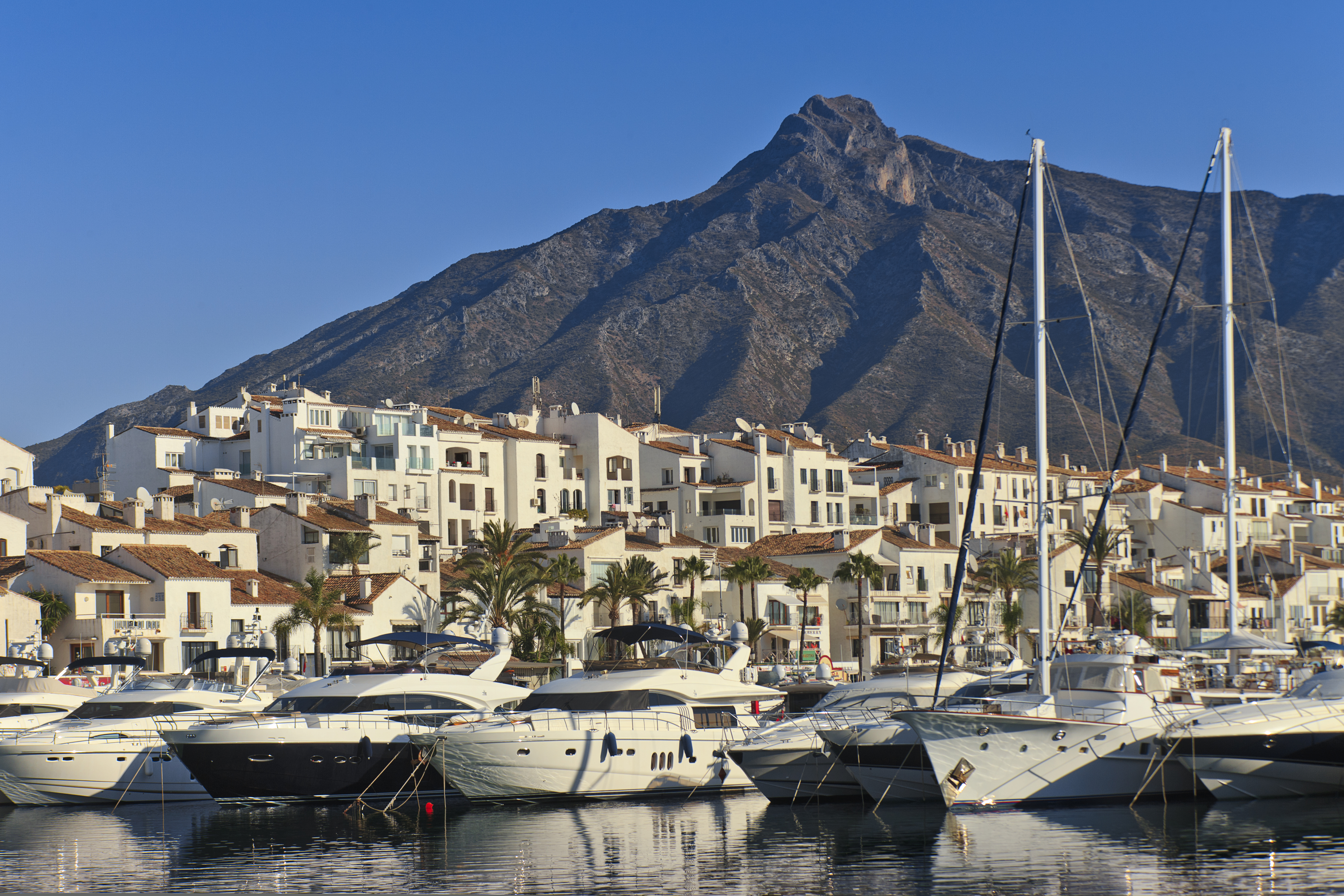
Puerto Banús

As in most cities of the Andalusian coast, Marbella's economy revolves around tertiary activities. The service sector accounts for 60% of employment, while trade accounts for almost 20%. The main branches of the service sector are hospitality, real estate, and business services, which underscores the importance of tourism in Marbella's economy. Employment in construction, industry, and agriculture is 14.2%, 3.8%, and 2.4% respectively.

The number of business establishments in the service sector accounts for 87.5% of the total. Businesses in construction account for 9.6% and, in industry, 2.9%. Of these companies, 89.5% have fewer than 5 employees and only 2.3% have a staff of at least 20 employees.

In 2008, a study by the Institute of Statistics of Andalusia (IEA) based on 14 variables (income, equipment, training, etc.), found Marbella was the Andalusian city with the most developed general welfare and the highest quality of life. According to the study's results, Marbella ranks highest in the number of private clinics, sports facilities, and private schools.

In December 2016, an investment fund based in Hong Kong announced that it had acquired 170,000 square metres (1,800,000 square feet) of land near Elviria and planned to invest €300 million to develop a five-star luxury hotel and 120 villas. According to its developer, the future resort "is to be the most luxurious in the country" and will be run by an international hotel chain.

== Transport ==
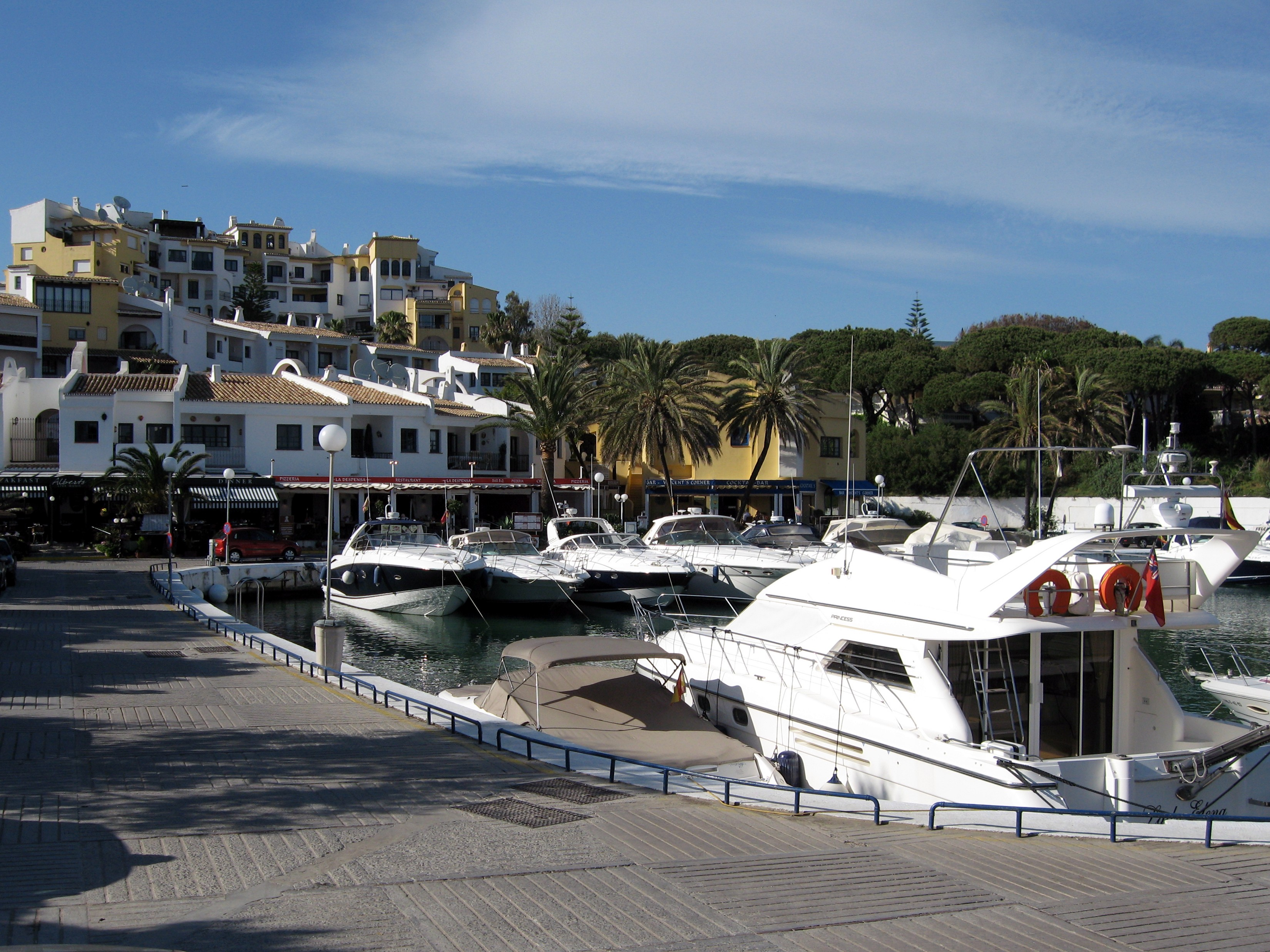
Port of Cabopino

Cities on the coast are accessible by bus from Marbella, including Málaga, Estepona, Torremolinos, Fuengirola and Gibraltar. The area is also served by the A7 motorway; the closest airport is Málaga-Costa Del Sol.

=== Shipping ===
The four ports of Marbella are primarily recreational; although both Puerto Banús and the Puerto de la Bajadilla are permitted to dock cruise ships, neither operates regular service to other ports. The port of Bajadilla is home to the Marbella fishermen's guild and is used to transport goods.

=== Rail ===
Marbella is the most populous municipality in the Iberian Peninsula without a railway station in its territory, and is the only Spanish city of over 100,000 inhabitants not served by rail.

A project is underway to construct a railway (Costa del Sol railway) to connect Nerja, Málaga, and Algeciras. It may be a high speed railway with several stops in Marbella. Until then, the nearest station is near Fuengirola, 27 km (17 miles) distant. Further away is Málaga Maria Zambrano, in Málaga city, 57 km (35 miles) away, and Ronda railway station, also 57 km (35 miles).

=== Urban bus ===
Marbella offers residents of the municipality free mobility on its urban bus lines (Urbanos de Marbella) operated by Avanza, thanks to the Tarjeta Municipal de Movilidad. There are currently 14 urban bus lines, spanning from San Pedro de Alcántara to Cabopino, including the seasonal Starlite line available during summers and the L11 available only on 31 October and 1 November. The lines are as follows:

- L1: C.C. La Cañada – Marbella Centro – Puerto Banús.
- L2: C.C. La Cañada – Miraflores – El Mirador.
- L3. C.C. La Cañada – Nagüeles – Puerto Banús – El Ángel.
- L4: Puerto Banús – (El Ángel) – Nueva Andalucía – San Pedro.
- L5: Puerto Banús – El Ángel – Nueva Andalucía – San Pedro – El Salto.
- L6: Cabopino – Las Chapas – Marbella Centro – Estación de Autobuses – C.C. La Cañada.
- L6B: Bello Horizonte – Miraflores – C.C. La Cañada.
- L7 (circular): San Pedro – Centro de Salud.
- L8 (night bus): C.C. La Cañada – Marbella Centro – Puerto Banús – San Pedro.
- L9 (night bus): Cabopino – Las Chapas – Marbella Centro.
- L10 (seasonal, only during summers): Marbella Centro – Starlite.
- L11 (seasonal, only on 31 October and 1 November): Marbella Centro – Divina Pastora – Cementerio Nuevo.
- L12: Hospital Costa del Sol – Marbella Centro – Nueva Andalucía.
- L13: Hospital Costa del Sol – Marbella Centro – San Pedro.

=== Intercity bus ===
Most intercity bus services are operated by CTSA-Portillo. They connect Marbella to other urban centres, such as Málaga and its airport, nearby towns in the interior (Benahavis, Ojen, Ronda), the Campo, including Gibraltar (La Linea and Algeciras), some major cities in Andalusia (Almería, Cádiz, Córdoba, Jerez, Granada, Jaen, Seville, and Úbeda), and Mérida in Extremadura. The central bus station has connections to other domestic destinations, such as Madrid and Barcelona.

=== Taxis ===
There are taxis to Marbella from the airports at Malaga and Gibraltar and from the taxi ranks along the Costa del Sol. Marbella is not formally integrated into the Metropolitan Transportation Consortium Málaga area.

== Media ==
Due to the city's ethnic diversity, Marbella's newspapers and magazines are published in several European languages, among which are La Tribuna de Marbella (in Spanish) and Costa del Sol Nachrichten (in German). In addition, Diario Sur (Spanish) or Southern Journal (English) and La Opinión de Málaga (Spanish) have editorial offices in the city. Among the English language magazines with the largest circulation are those dedicated to fashion and lifestyle, such as Essential Magazine and Society Marbella Magazine.

=== News websites ===
1. The Olive Press – A Spanish newspaper that features a dedicated section for Marbella news. It covers a wide range of topics, including local events, health issues, crime, and environmental concerns. The Olive Press has reported on various significant issues affecting the Marbella community, such as the long waiting times for surgery at Costa del Sol Hospital and the economic impact of Puerto Banus marina.
2. Marbella Daily – Marbella Daily offers daily news updates and insights into community, environment, healthcare, and more. It has reported on diverse topics, from Marbella's emergence as a new foodie paradise to the challenges faced by British expats in the area. Marbella Daily aims to keep the community connected and informed about the latest developments.
3. Sur in English – This is another key source for news in Marbella and San Pedro de Alcantara. Sur in English provides information in English, catering to the expat community and tourists. It covers a broad spectrum of news, including local events and issues.
4. MarbsLifestyle.com – Although primarily a blog, MarbsLifestyle.com offers daily inspiration and information about Marbella's hotspots, including restaurants and beach clubs. It provides insights into the lifestyle and attractions of Marbella.
5. Euro Weekly News – The Euro Weekly News covers news from across Marbella, including Puerto Banus. It is a popular English language newspaper in Spain, offering updates on local events, crime, and community news.

Marbella has several local television stations, such as M95 Television, Summer TV, and South Coast Television. It also has several digital news dailies, including the Voice of Marbella and Journal of Marbella.

== Culture ==
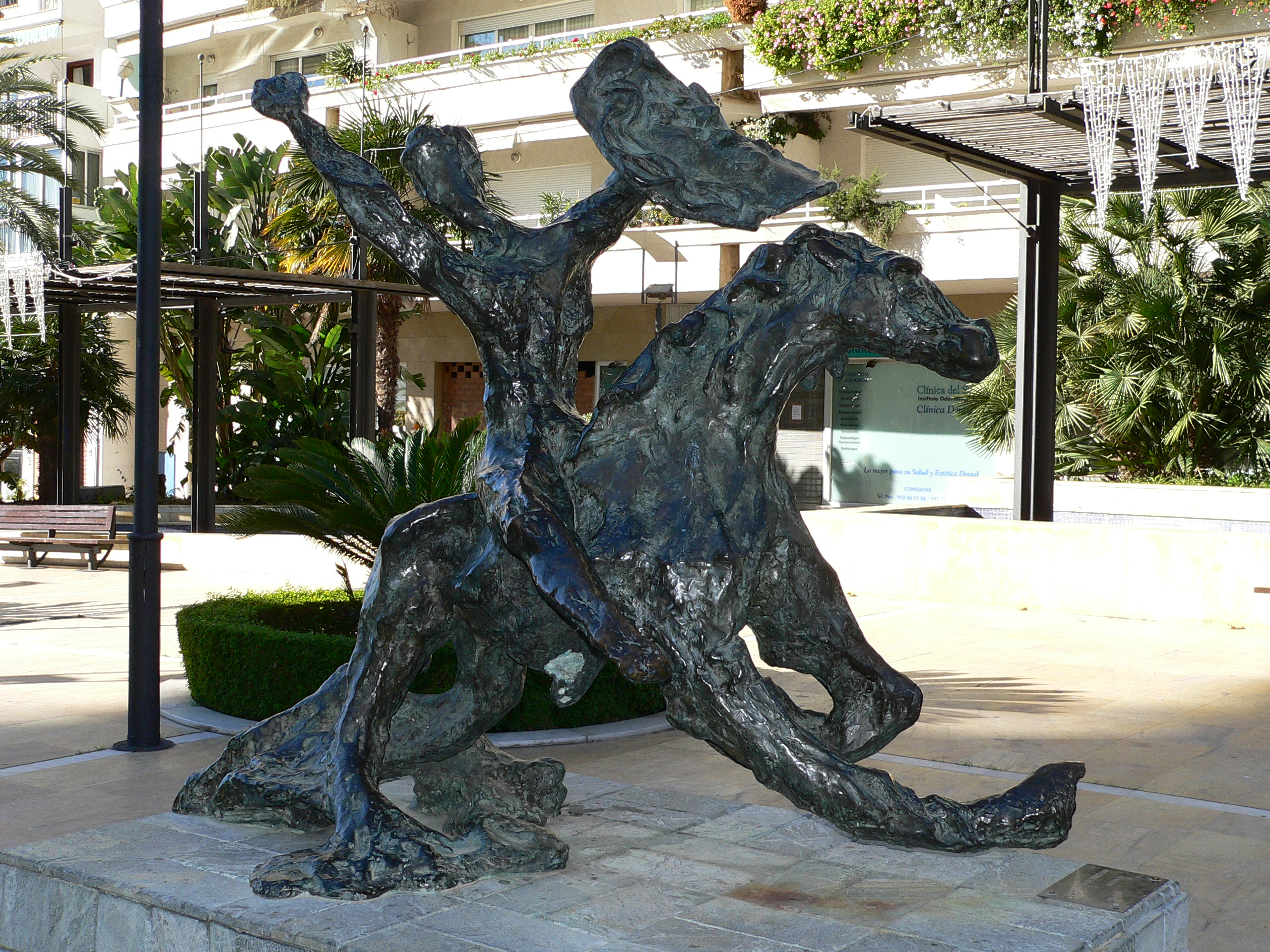
Bronze sculpture by Salvador Dalí on Avenida del Mar

Besides the typical Andalusian cultural events, a variety of annual festivals are held in Marbella, mainly between June and October; other events are held sporadically. Festivals dedicated to music include the Marbella International Opera Festival held in August since 2001, the Marbella Reggae Festival in July, and the Marbella International Film Festival in June at different locations around the city—amongst them the beach, aboard a boat or in Old Town. It also hosts the Marbella International Film Festival, the Spanish Film Festival and the Festival of Independent Theatre.

To provide venues for these and other events, the city has cultural facilities both publicly and privately managed, such as the Auditorium of Constitution Park, the Ingenio Cultural Centre, the Teatro Ciudad de Marbella or Black Box Theatre, among others. In addition, there is a music conservatory, a cinema club and several cinemas showing foreign films dubbed into Castilian.

The International Contemporary Art Fair I, also known as MARB ART, was held in Marbella in 2005, exhibiting works of photography, painting, sculpture and graphic design by over 500 artists; it has been held annually since at the Palace of Congresses. The following year the 2006 extension of the Ateneo de Málaga Marbella (Atheneum of Málaga Marbella) opened, dedicated to the development of artistic and cultural activities.

Amongst local cultural associations is the Cilniana Association, an organisation dedicated to protecting and promoting the heritage of Marbella and neighbouring towns, which publishes its own magazine. Since 2009 the city has been home to Marbella University, the first private university in the province of Málaga. In 2013, the city welcomed the opening of Marbella International University Centre (MIUC), an international higher-education institution focused on Business, Politics and Media, and the only university in Andalusia where courses are taught in both English and Spanish.

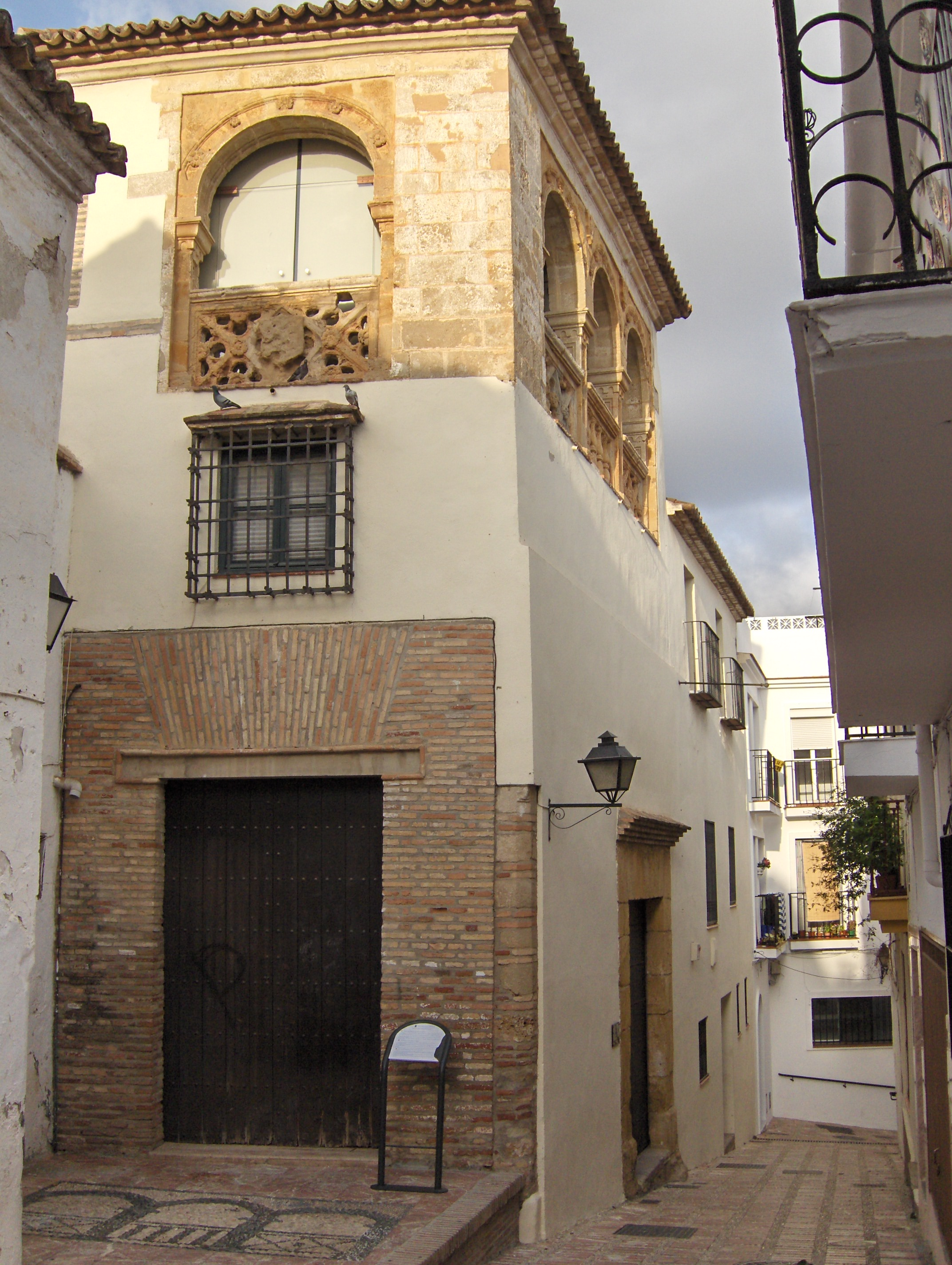
Hospital Bazán, the Museum of Engraving

=== Museums ===
- Contemporary Spanish Engraving Museum: created in 1992, contains a collection of prints by 20th-century artists such as Picasso, Miró, Dalí, Tàpies, Chillida and the El Paso Group (Rafael Canogar, Manolo Millares, Antonio Saura, Pablo Serrano, et al.) amongst others, as well as an exhibition hall dedicated to teaching engraving techniques.
- Museum Cortijo de Miraflores: in addition to the museum, the farm houses an exhibition hall and other cultural classrooms, amongst them the olive oil mill.
- Bonsai Museum: opened in 1992, it has a collection of specimens on permanent display and others for sale, with an emphasis on its extensive collection of olive trees and examples of species such as Ginkgo, Oxicedro, Pentafila Pino, and zelcoba, also pines, oaks, and other species.
- Ralli Museum, dedicated primarily to art in Latin America, it has sculptures by Dalí and Aristide Maillol and paintings by Dalí, Miró, Chagall, Henry Moore, amongst others.
- Municipal Archaeological Collection: its collection consists of archaeological artefacts found in the municipality.
- Mechanical Art Museum: a cultural centre located in the 19th-century Barriada del Ingenio, it contains sculptures made from second-hand car parts by Antonio Alonso.

=== Cuisine ===
The traditional cuisine of Marbella is that of the Malagueño coast and is based on seafood. The most typical dish is fried fish, using anchovies, mackerel, mullet or squid, amongst others. Gazpacho and garlic soup are very typical. Bakeries sell oil cakes, wine donuts, borrachuelos (aniseed rolls fried with a little wine and dipped into syrup), torrijas (similar to French toast) and churros (fritters). In addition to the traditional native cuisine, there are many restaurants in Marbella that serve food of the international, nouvelle, or fusion cuisines.

=== Festivals ===
In June, the Fair and Fiesta of San Bernabe honour the patron saint of Marbella. They last a week, with activities and performances divided in two parts: Fair Day, which began in Old Town and is now held in the Avenida del Doctor Maíz Viñals, and Fair Night, in Arroyo Primero.

October sees the fair and festivals honouring the patron saint of San Pedro Alcantara. These too last a week. The smaller Fair and Festivals of Nueva Andalucía, celebrated in early October in Las Chapas and El Ángel, are also popular.

Throughout the summer season (July to October) most barrios of Marbella have events organised by neighbourhood associations to encourage cultural activities including: bullfights, musical performances, photo competitions, and sporting events. Among the best known associations are those of Santa Marta, Salto del Agua, Leganitos, Divina Pastora, Trapiche, Plaza de Toros and Miraflores.

Other festivals and local celebrations include the Pilgrimages of Cruz de Juanar (May), La Virgen del Carmen (July) and La Virgen Madre (August), as well as the Día del Tostón (November), a traditional celebration which consists of going to the fields to roast chestnuts.

== Education ==
- Les Roches Marbella (international school of hospitality management)
- British International School of Marbella
- Deutsche Schule Málaga (German school)
- Aloha College (international school)
- Swans International School

== Tourism ==
The city is especially popular with tourists from Northern Europe (including the United Kingdom, Ireland, Sweden and Germany) and also Saudi Arabia, and the United Arab Emirates. Marbella is particularly noted for the presence of aristocrats, celebrities and wealthy people; it is a popular destination for luxury yachts, and increasingly so for cruise ships, which dock in its harbour.

The area is popular with golfers and boaters, and there are many private estates and luxury hotels in the vicinity, including the Marbella Club Hotel. Marbella hosts a WTA tennis tournament on red clay, the Andalucia Tennis Experience.

Sights in or near Marbella include:

- Arabian wall
- Bonsai museum
- Museo del Grabado Español Contemporáneo
- Old city centre
- Playa de la Bajadilla (beach)
- Playa de Fontanilla (beach)
- Puerto Banús, a marina built by José Banús
- The Golden Mile featuring the Marbella Club Hotel and its beach club, as well as the late King Fahd's palace.
- Encarnation's Church (Iglesia de la Encarnación). Oldest church in the city situated in the old-town.
- Basilica Vega del Mar
- Las Bóvedas

== Notable residents ==
- Fulgencio Batista, Cuban military dictator, died in Marbella
- Arthur Rubinstein, concert pianist, purchased a house in Marbella in the 1950s. In the 1957 academy award-winning documentary film, "Arthur Rubinstein, The Love of Life," the footage of Rubinstein at home was filmed at his Marbella, Spain house,
- Sean Connery had a residence in Marbella from 1970 to 1998, where he was regularly seen playing golf when not filming.
- Jean Negulesco, Romanian-American film director and screenwriter, lived in Marbella from the late 1960s until his death on 18 July 1993 at age 93.
- Novak Djokovic
- Jon Olsson
- Rick Parfitt OBE, British rock musician from Status Quo, lived in the mountains just outside Marbella.
- Antonio Banderas, born in the nearby city of Málaga, has been a regular visitor to Marbella where he has a house in Los Monteros. Stella, his daughter with wife actress Melanie Griffith, was born in Marbella in 1999.
- Arms dealer Monzer al-Kassar was a longtime resident until his imprisonment, and has been nicknamed "The Prince of Marbella".
- Mike Reid, English actor and comedian, was living in Marbella at the time of his death on 29 July 2007. He was born in Hackney, London, and retired to Marbella a few years before he died.
- Millie Bobby Brown, English actress and Eleven in Stranger Things was born in Marbella on 19 February 2004.
- Ráhel Orbán, eldest daughter of Hungarian prime minister Viktor Orbán, moved with her family to Marbella in September 2021.
- Erling Braut Haaland has a villa in Marbella (bought in April 2022), close to the Golden Mile
- David Campaña, footballer
- Eva Longoria, actress, moved with her family to Marbella in 2024

== Twin towns – sister cities ==
Marbella is twinned with:

- Baler, Aurora, Philippines
- (Georgia (country)) Batumi, Autonomous Republic of Adjara, Georgia
- Doha, Qatar
- Itanhaém, São Paulo, Brazil
- Jeddah, Hejaz, Saudi Arabia
- Kure, Hiroshima, Japan
- Miami Beach, Florida, United States
- Nabeul, Cape Bon, Tunisia
- Punta del Este, Maldonado Department, Uruguay
- Solidaridad, Quintana Roo, Mexico

== See also ==
- Puerto Banús
- Marbella blast furnaces
- Marbella International Film Festival
- Marbella Suns
- List of municipalities in Málaga
