= San Juan de Dios, Marbella =

Church in Marbella, southern Spain

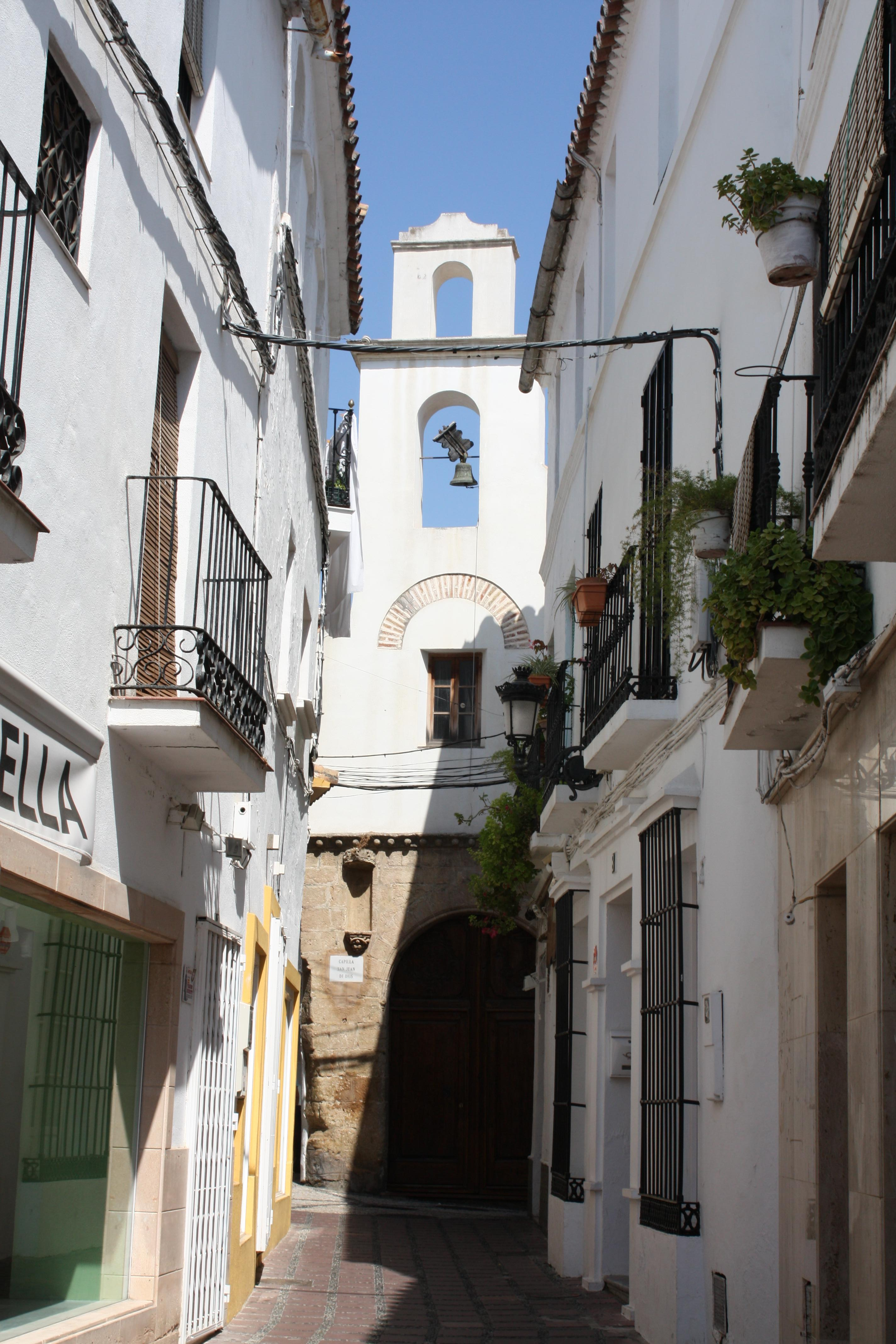
Chapel of San Juan de Dios.

The Capilla de San Juan de Dios is a church in Marbella, southern Spain. It was built in the 16th century.
