= Casa del Corregidor (Marbella) =

Building in Marbella, Andalusia, Spain

Coordinates: 36.510156°N 4.885220°W

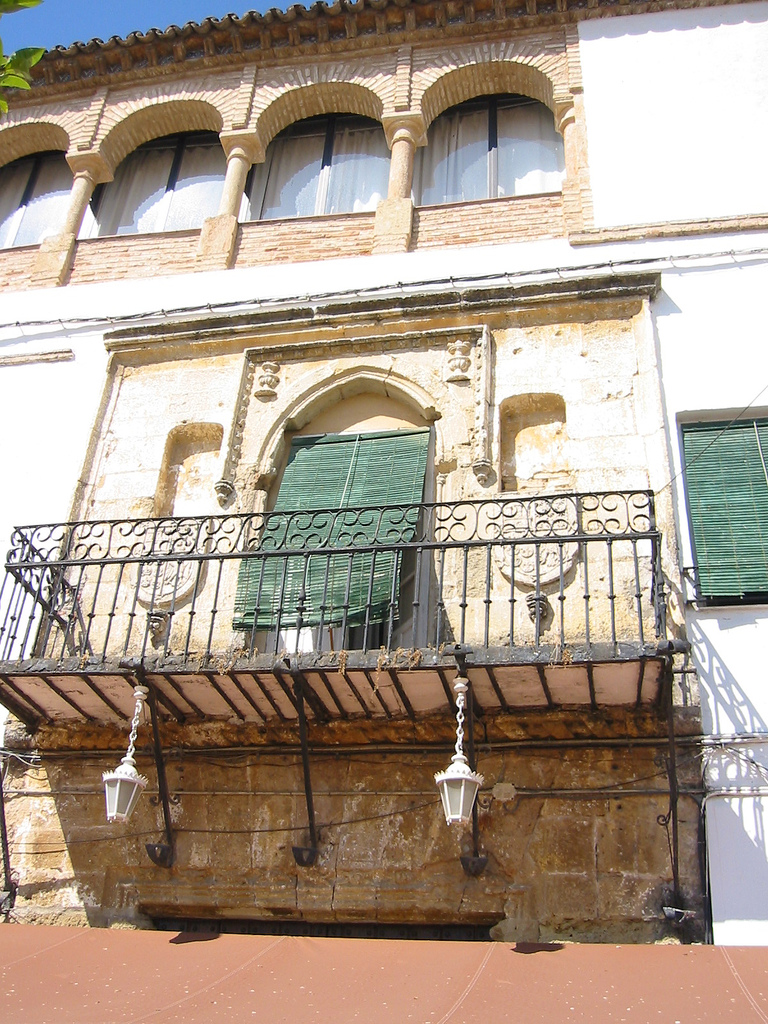

The Casa del Corregidor is a building located in the town of Marbella, southern Spain.

It was built in 1552, with a stone facade emblazoned with a balcony backed by three arches, combining Gothic and Renaissance elements. The Moorish-style ceiling contains fresco murals.
