= Ermita del Santo Cristo de la Vera Cruz (Marbella) =

Church in Marbella, Spain

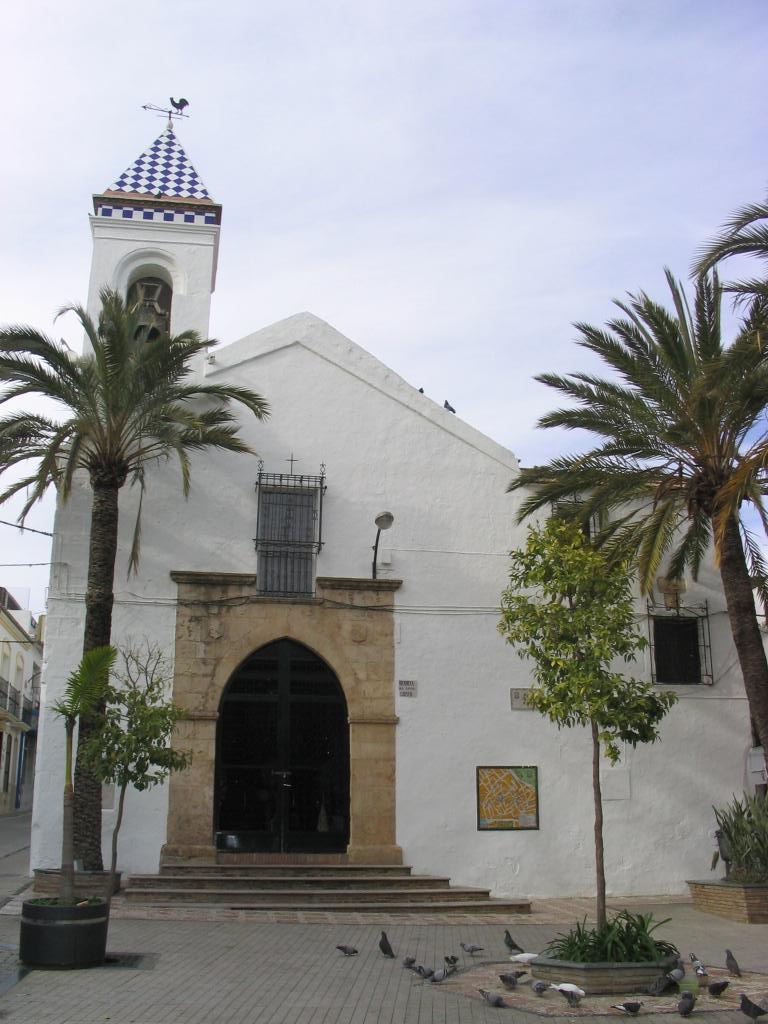
Ermita del Santo Cristo de la Vera Cruz.

The Ermita del Santo Cristo de la Vera Cruz (Spanish: "Hermitage of the Holy Christ of the True Cross") is a church in Marbella, southern Spain. It is situated in the Barrio Alto, historic suburb of the ancient city, considered part of the old town.

The chapel was built in the 15th century and later expanded in the 18th century. The main façade has a cover of stone and the rest is finished in lime stucco, as is traditional in many hermitages of Andalusia. The bell tower is square and is covered by a roof of glazed ceramic.
