= Ermita de Santiago =

Church in Marbella, Spain

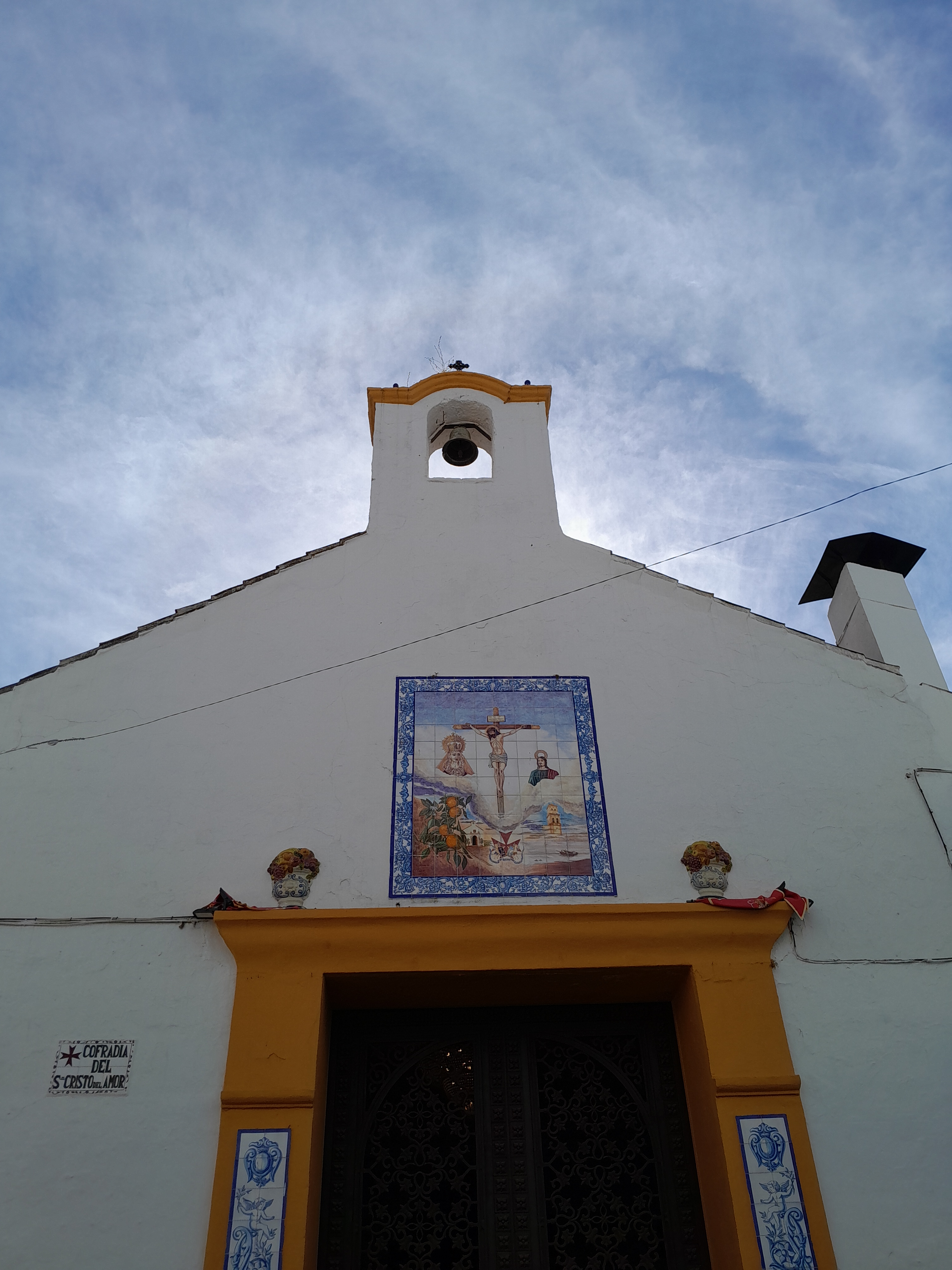
Exterior

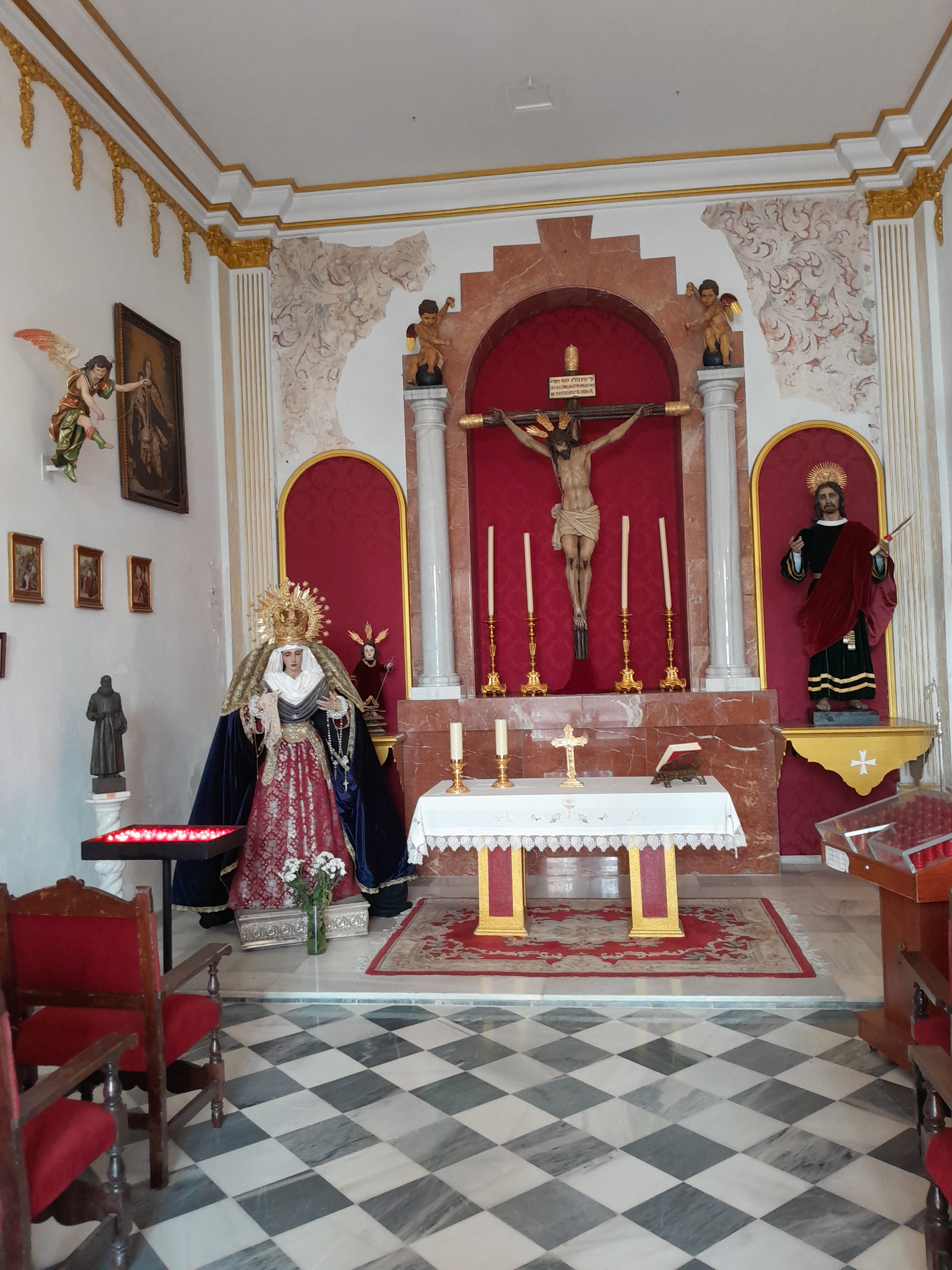
Interior

Ermita de Santiago is a church in Marbella, Spain. Built in the 15th century after the capture of Marbella by the Crown of Castile, it is the oldest religious building in the city. It is located in the Plaza de los Naranjos in the heart of Old Town. The chapel has a single rectangular nave covered with Islamic tiles.
