= Plaza de los Naranjos =

Plaza in Marbella, Spain

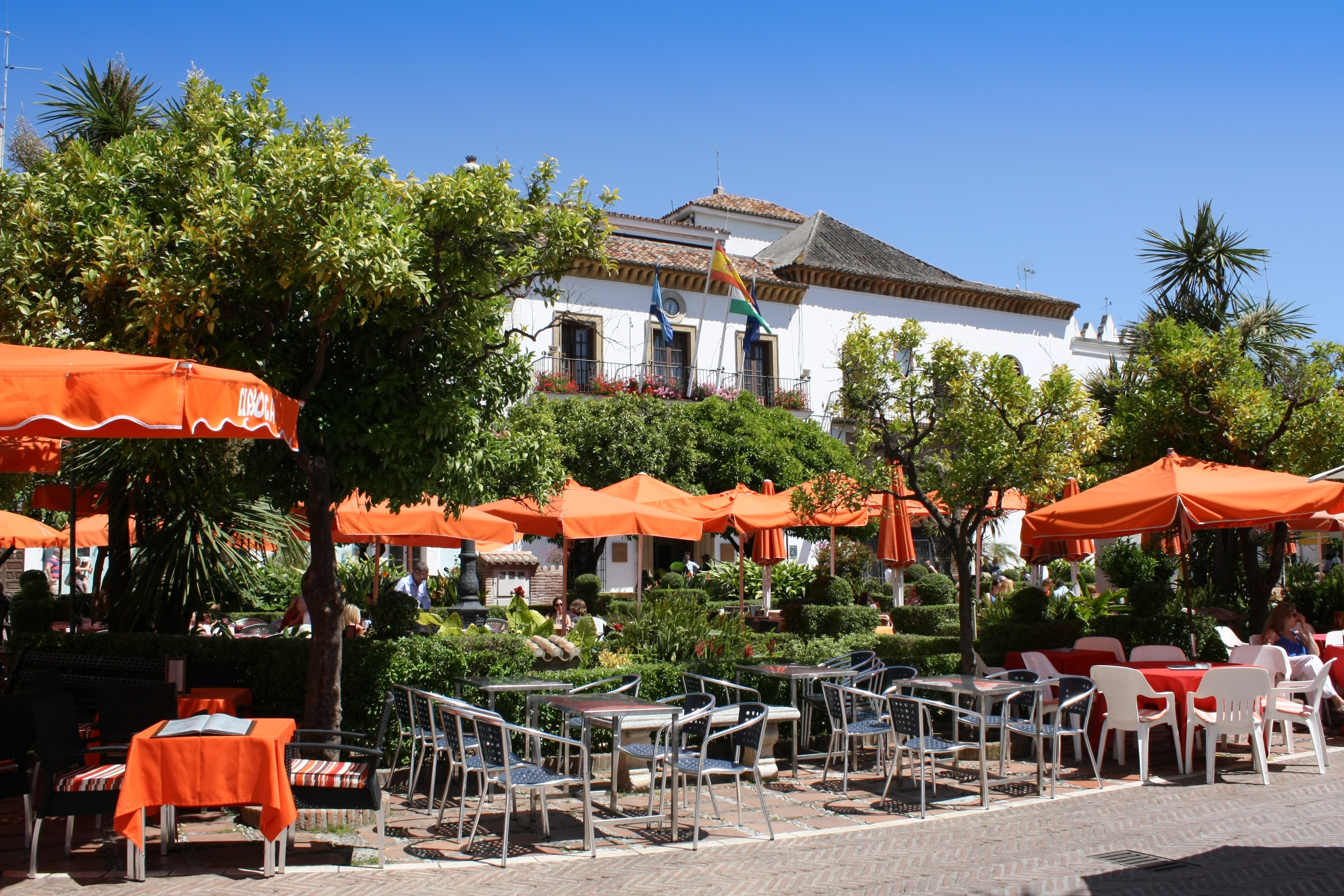
Marbella Town Hall from across Plaza de los Naranjos

The Plaza de los Naranjos is a plaza in the old town of Marbella, Spain. The plaza dates from 1485, after the Christian conquest of the city from The Moors; the area was created to be the urban hub of the city. The plaza is framed by typical white Andalusian houses and three historic buildings: the Casa Consistorial, the Casa del Corregidor and the Ermita de Santiago. In the center of the plaza, there is a Renaissance fountain surrounded by orange trees, planted in 1941, from which the square now takes its name.
