= Casa consistorial de Marbella =

Building in Spain

Coordinates: 36.5104°N 4.8850°W

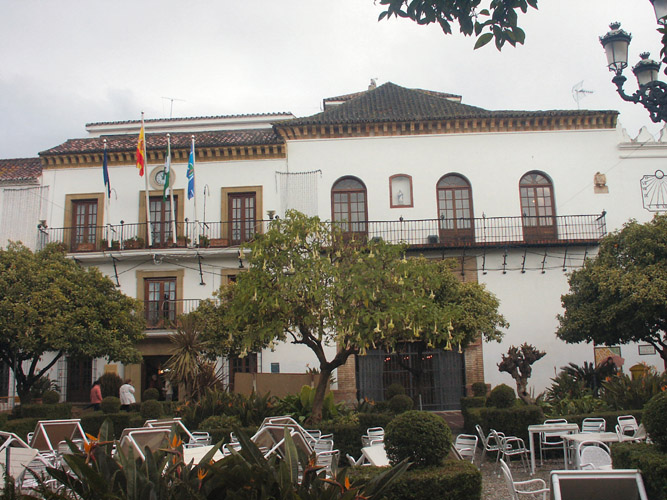
Casa consistorial of Marbella.

The Casa Consistorial De Marbella is a historic building in the city of Marbella, southern Spain, currently housing the city's town hall. Constructed in 1568 in the Renaissance style, it lies in the Plaza de los Naranjos in the city's historic district. The building's exterior includes a sundial and coat of arms, as well as memorial plaques written in Old Spanish to commemorate the conquest of the city in 1485 by Ferdinand and Isabella, the establishment of the city's water supply in 1632, and additions to the building in 1779.
