= Agrón =

- Municipality
- Flag Coat of arms

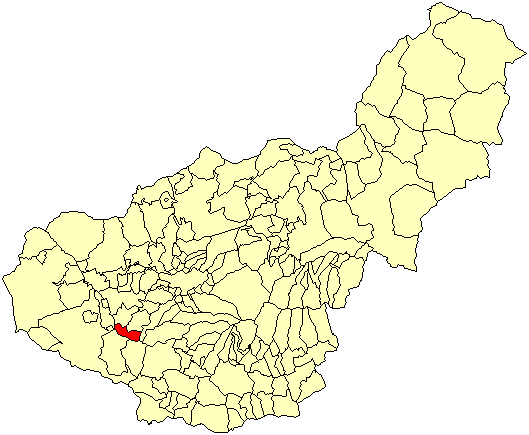
- Location in Granada

- Location in Spain
- Coordinates: 37°01′48″N 3°49′45″W
- Country: Spain
- Autonomous community: Andalusia
- Province: Granada
- Comarca: Comarca de Alhama

Government
  - Mayor: María del Pilar López Romero (PSOE)

Area
  - Total: 27.00 km^{2} (10.42 sq mi)
- Elevation: 1,060 m (3,480 ft)

Population (2025-01-01)
  - Total: 247
  - Density: 9.15/km^{2} (23.7/sq mi)
- Time zone: UTC+1 (CET)
  - Summer (DST): UTC+2 (CEST)
- Postal code: 18132
- Website: www.agron.es

Agrón is a Spanish town and municipality located in the eastern part of the region of Alhama, in the province of Granada, autonomous community of Andalusia. It is surrounded by the municipalities of Ventas de Huelma, Escúzar, Alhendín, Jayena, Arenas del Rey and Cacín. Other nearby towns are Pantano de los Bermejales and Ácula. Agrón is one of the fifty-two entities that make up the Metropolitan Area of Granada.

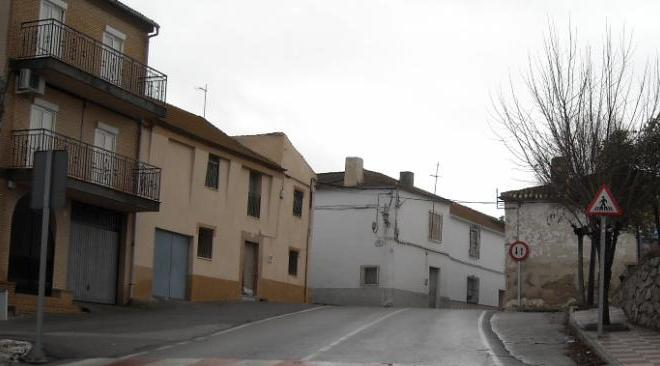

== History ==
Its toponym, of Latin reminiscences - "Agrum", which means "Field" - refers to an agricultural activity that has been the livelihood of its inhabitants throughout history. The municipality, in terms of the development of historical events, has been closely linked, like all the others in this area of El Temple, to Alhama de Granada and, like it, has seen the times of theRoman Empire, the long Muslim domination, the subsequent Christianization after the Granada war and, already in the 19th century, the presence in its lands ofNapoleonic troops during the War of Independence.

Today, the Dukes of Wellington own a large estate called Fatimbullar in Agrón.

== Demography ==
After the mechanization of the agricultural world, Agrón fell into a deep crisis, with its population decreasing continuously since 1960 due to massive emigration to other parts of the country, mainly Catalonia and Germany.

According to the National Statistics Institute of Spain, in 2017 Agrón had 290 registered inhabitants.

== Politics ==
The electoral results in the last municipal elections are reflected in the following table:

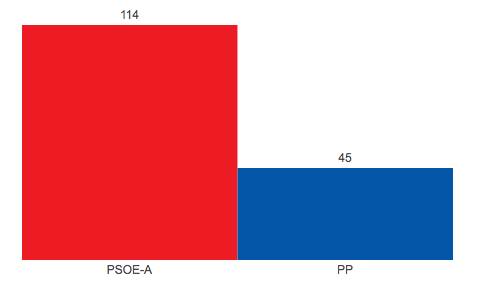
Electoral results in the last municipalities elections

The Socialist Party won with 114 votes, and the current mayor is María del Pilar López Romero.

== Communications ==
The only means of communication that runs through the municipality is the road A-338, named "Carretera de Alhama"

North-west: Cacín and Ventas de Huelma.	North: Ventas de Huelma and Escúzar	North-east: Escúzar
West: Cacín and Arenas del Rey		East: Alhendín
South-west: Arenas del Rey	South: Arenas del Rey and Jayena	South-east: Jayena

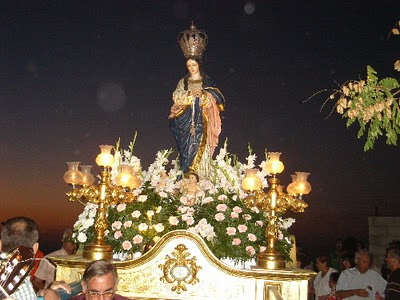
Inmaculada Conception

== Culture ==
Patronal feasts: Its popular festivities are celebrated every year on the weekend before the 15th of August

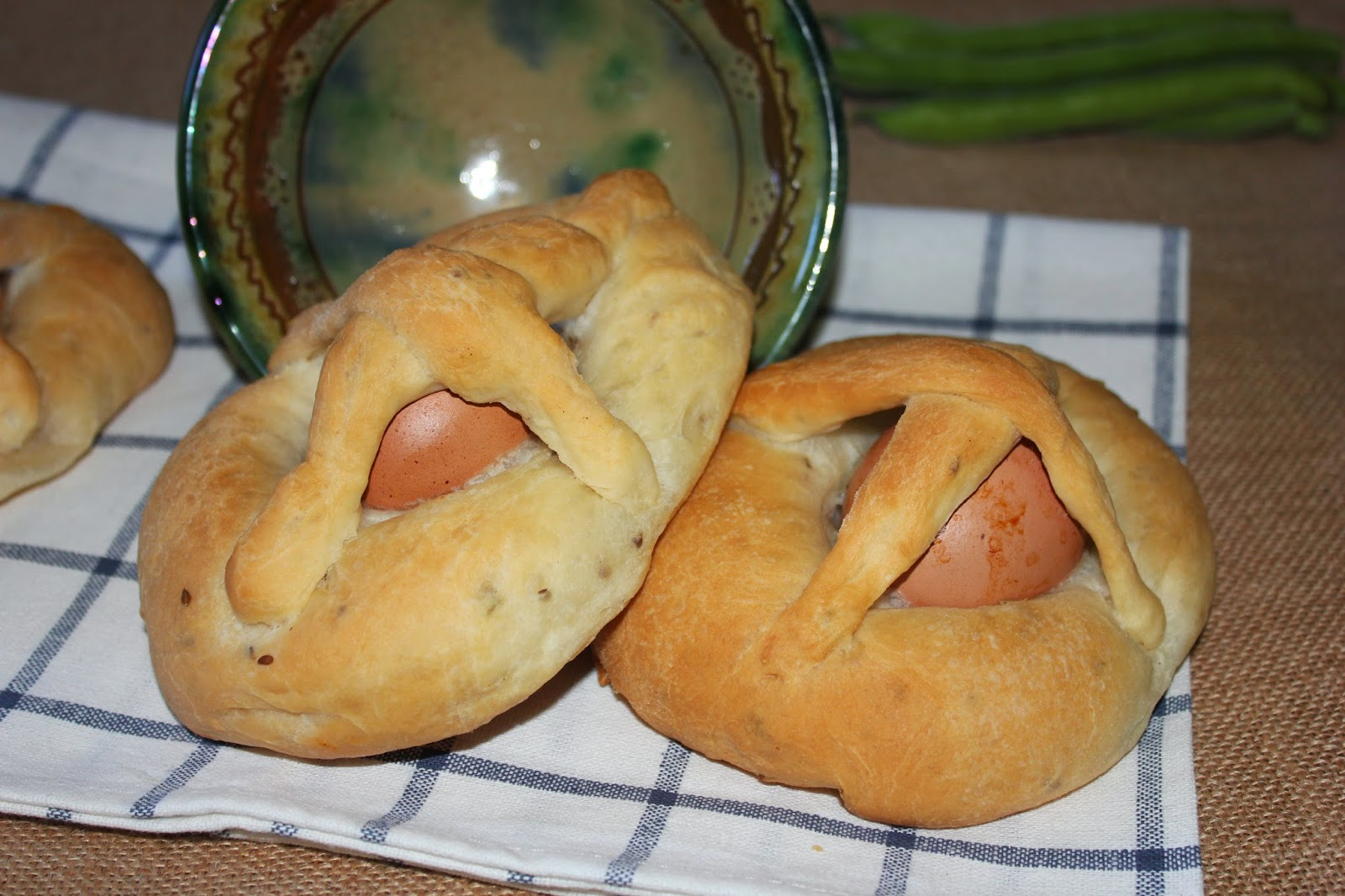
Hornazo

in honour of the town's patron saint, the Immaculate Conception.

It is also typical of Agrón, as in a good part of the province of Granada, to celebrate the 25th of April the day of San Marcos, where people gather in the afternoon to taste the popular hornazos -buns of oil in which a boiled egg is placed- accompanied by green beans.

== See also ==
- List of municipalities in Granada
