= Comarca de Alhama =

- Comarca
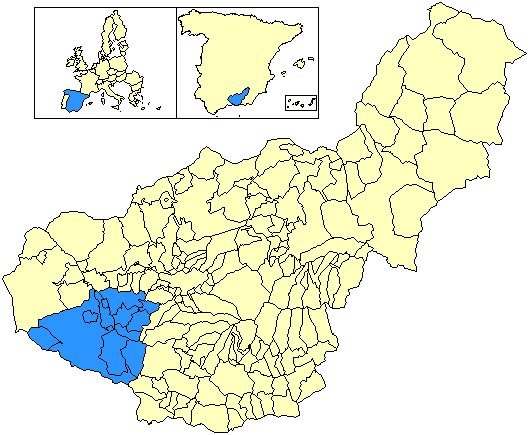
- Location of Comarca de Alhama in the province of Granada, Andalusia, Spain
- Coordinates: 37°2′31″N 3°51′18″W
- Country: Spain
- Autonomous community: Andalusia
- Province: Granada

Area
  - Total: 974.71 km^{2} (376.34 sq mi)

Population (2023) (Note: Estimate at 1 January 2023: National Statistics Institute (Spain).)
  - Total: 16,418
  - Density: 16.844/km^{2} (43.626/sq mi)

Comarca de Alhama is a comarca in the province of Granada, Spain. The southern portion of the comarca contains the Sierras of Tejeda, Almijara and Alhama Natural Park. This comarca was established in 2003 by the Government of Andalusia.

== Municipalities ==
It contains the following municipalities:

Arms	Municipality	Area (km^{2})	Population (2023) (Note: Estimate at 1 January 2023: National Statistics Institute (Spain).)	Density (/km^{2})
	Agrón	27	239	8.85
	Alhama de Granada	433.23	5,655	13.05
	Arenas del Rey	90.91	617	6.79
	Cacín	39.60	527	13.31
	Chimeneas	90.27	1,238	13.71
	Escúzar	46.39	841	18.13
	Fornes	15.14	543	35.87
	Játar	9.57	582	60.82
	Jayena	80	993	12.41
	La Malahá	25.42	1,845	72.58
	Santa Cruz del Comercio	16.88	530	31.40
	Ventas de Huelma	42.44	651	15.34
	Zafarraya	57.86	2,157	37.28
	Total	974,71	16,418	16.84
