= Zafarraya =

- Municipality
- Flag Coat of arms

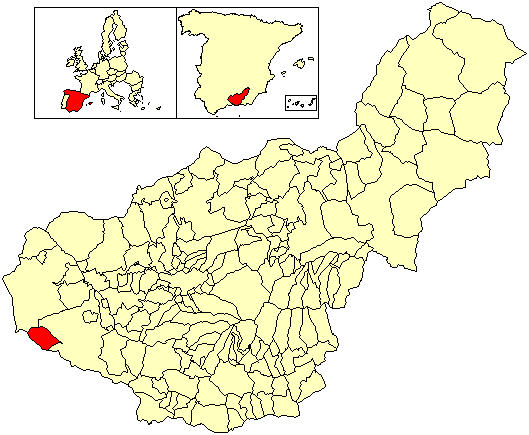
- Location of Zafarraya
- Interactive map of Zafarraya
- Location in Spain
- Coordinates: 36°58′N 4°8′W
- Country: Spain
- Autonomous community: Andalusia
- Province: Granada
- Comarca: Alhama
- Judicial district: Loja

Government
  - Alcalde: José Miguel Muñoz Ortigosa (2007) (PSOE)

Area
  - Total: 57.86 km^{2} (22.34 sq mi)
- Elevation: 893 m (2,930 ft)

Population (2025-01-01)
  - Total: 2,244
  - Density: 38.78/km^{2} (100.4/sq mi)
- Demonym(s): Zafarrayero, -a Choceño, -a
- Time zone: UTC+1 (CET)
  - Summer (DST): UTC+2 (CEST)
- Postal code: 18128
- Official language(s): Spanish
- Website: Official website

Zafarraya is a municipality in the province of Granada, Spain, with a population of 2,200 (2003).

Zafarraya is known for a Neanderthal mandible found in a cave (Cueva del Boquete) in 1983 by Cecilio Barroso and Paqui Medina. The mandible has been dated to 30,000 years Before Present (BP), and at the time represented the youngest-known Neanderthal remains. Near the mandible, Mousterian tools dated to 27,000 years BP were found. The find was one of the first pieces of definite evidence showing that the presence of Neanderthals and modern humans overlapped in Europe for a significant period.

During the Andalusian earthquake of 25 December 1884, more than 30% of the houses in Zafarraya collapsed and 53% were badly damaged, some of which fell during aftershocks. The new church, which was under construction, was destroyed. 25 to 27 people died, 24 sustained serious injuries and 56 had minor injuries. However, in March 1885 it is reported that there were still 203 patients with traumatic conditions. The survivors took refuge in the town of Almendrón. The damage was less than in Ventas de Zafarraya due to differences in the land: Jurassic limestones in Zafarraya and Quaternary sediments in Ventas de Zafarraya.

== See also ==
- List of municipalities in Granada
