= Torquato =

Torquato may refer to:

- Torquato Cardilli (born 1942), Italian Muslim ambassador
- Torquato Neto (1944–1972), Brazilian journalist and poet
- Torquato Taramelli (1845–1922), Italian geologist
- Torquato Tasso (1544–1595), Italian poet
