= Belmas =

Belmas or Belmás is a surname. Notable people with the surname include:

- Juliet Caroline Belmas, Canadian anarchist activist and filmmaker
- Lambert Belmas (born 1997), French rugby league player
- Louis Belmas (1757–1841), French bishop
- Mariano Belmás Estrada (1850–1916), Spanish architect
- Xenia Belmas (c. 1890– 1981), Russian soprano
