= List of earthquakes in 1954 =

Earthquakes in 1954
Approximate epicenters of notable earthquakes in 1954
- 4.0–5.9 magnitude
- 6.0–6.9 magnitude
- 7.0–7.9 magnitude
- 8.0+ magnitude
- Strongest: Spain, Andalusia (Magnitude 7.8) March 29
- Deadliest: France, Chlef Province, Algeria (Magnitude 6.7) September 9 1,243 deaths
- Total fatalities: 1,295

Number by magnitude
- 9.0+: 0

This is a list of earthquakes in 1954. Only magnitude 6.0 or greater earthquakes appear on the list. Lower magnitude events are included if they have caused death, injury or damage. Events which occurred in remote areas will be excluded from the list as they wouldn't have generated significant media interest. All dates are listed according to UTC time. The year was characterized by a lack of large events. The largest event of magnitude 7.8 occurred in Spain, albeit a rare event for the area, there were no deaths due to its depth. A significant quake struck Nevada in December. With a magnitude of 7.3, this was one of the largest in the state's history. Total lives lost in the year amounted to 1,295. The vast majority of these came from Algeria, which suffered one of its worst disasters in September.

== Overall ==
=== By death toll ===
Rank	Death toll	Magnitude	Location	MMI	Depth (km)	Date
1	1,243	6.7	France, Chlef Province, Algeria	XI (Extreme)	15.0	September 9
2	31	6.7	Greece, Thessaly	X (Extreme)	10.0	April 30
3	13	6.6	Philippines, southeast Luzon	IX (Violent)	15.0	July 2

- Note: At least 10 casualties

=== By magnitude ===
Rank	Magnitude	Death toll	Location	MMI	Depth (km)	Date
1	7.8	0	Spain, Andalusia	IV (Light)	626.2	March 29
2	7.4	0	Burma, Sagaing Region	( )	183.9	March 21
3	7.3	0	United States, central Nevada	X (Extreme)	15.0	December 16
= 4	7.2	0	Japan, Volcano Islands	( )	15.0	February 1
= 4	7.2	0	Mexico, Gulf of California	VII (Very strong)	10.0	April 29
5	7.1	0	Owen fracture zone	( )	15.0	March 31
= 6	7.0	0	China, Gansu Province	X (Extreme)	25.0	February 11
= 6	7.0	0	Indonesia, Banda Sea	( )	540.5	February 20
= 6	7.0	0	United Kingdom, South Sandwich Islands	( )	120.0	February 22
= 6	7.0	0	Fiji	( )	256.6	September 17

- Note: At least 7.0 magnitude

== Notable events ==
=== January ===
January
- Strongest: 6.8 M_{w} New Zealand
- Total fatalities: 0

Number by magnitude
- 8.0–8.9: 0
- 7.0–7.9: 0
- 6.0–6.9: 5

Date	Country and location	M_{w}	Depth (km)	MMI	Notes	Casualties	
Date	Country and location	M_{w}	Depth (km)	MMI	Notes	Dead	Injured
1	Indonesia, Flores	6.2	60.0	V			
12	New Zealand, south of South Island	6.5	35.0		Beginning of a series of events.		
12	New Zealand, south of South Island	6.8	35.0				
13	New Zealand, south of South Island	6.7	15.0				
28	Mexico, off the coast of Guerrero	6.0	0.0		Unknown depth.		

=== February ===
February
- Strongest: 7.2 M_{w} Japan
- Deadliest: 6.2 M_{w} Mexico; 6 deaths
- Total fatalities: 6

Number by magnitude
- 8.0–8.9: 0
- 7.0–7.9: 4
- 6.0–6.9: 8
- 5.0–5.9: 1

Date	Country and location	M_{w}	Depth (km)	MMI	Notes	Casualties	
Date	Country and location	M_{w}	Depth (km)	MMI	Notes	Dead	Injured
1	Japan, Volcano Islands	7.2	15.0				
5	Australia, New Ireland (island), Papua and New Guinea	6.7	35.0	VI			
5	Mexico, Chiapas	6.2	117.5		6 people were killed. Damage costs were around $17 million (1954 rate).	6	
11	China, Gansu Province	7.0	25.0	X	Many homes were destroyed.		
19	Nicaragua, off the west coast	6.8	35.0	rowspan="2"| Doublet earthquake.			
19	Nicaragua, off the west coast	6.8	35.0	VI			
19	New Zealand, Kermadec Islands	6.6	25.0				
19	Mexico, Michoacan	6.0	85.0				
20	Indonesia, Banda Sea	7.0	540.5				
22	United Kingdom, South Sandwich Islands	7.0	120.0				
23	India, Bhutan, Arunachal Pradesh	6.2	15.0	VI	Border region between the two countries.		
28	Japan, Ryukyu Islands	6.5	20.0				
28	Australia, east of Adelaide	5.4	4.0	VIII	Some damage was caused in the 1954 Adelaide earthquake. This was one of the strongest events in the area.		

=== March ===
March
- Strongest: 7.8 M_{w} Spain
- Total fatalities: 0

Number by magnitude
- 8.0–8.9: 0
- 7.0–7.9: 3
- 6.0–6.9: 9

Date	Country and location	M_{w}	Depth (km)	MMI	Notes	Casualties	
Date	Country and location	M_{w}	Depth (km)	MMI	Notes	Dead	Injured
3	Australia, Hela Province, Papua and New Guinea	6.8	15.0	VII			
3	United States, southern Alaska	6.3	56.0	V			
6	Fiji, south of	6.5	530.6				
9	Russian Soviet Federative Socialist Republic, Kuril Islands	6.3	27.5				
17	Mexico, off the coast of Guerrero	6.0	0.0		Unknown depth		
19	United States, southern California	6.4	6.0	VIII			
21	Burma, Sagaing Region	7.4	183.9		Some damage was caused.		
29	Philippines, Babuyan Islands	6.1	25.0				
29	Spain, Andalusia	7.8	626.2	IV	Main article: 1954 Spain earthquake		
30	United States, Hawaii (island), Hawaii	6.0	9.0	VI	Foreshock.		
30	United States, Hawaii (island), Hawaii	6.5	9.0	VIII			
31	Owen fracture zone	7.1	15.0				

=== April ===
April
- Strongest: 7.2 M_{w} Mexico
- Deadliest: 6.7 M_{w} Greece; 31 deaths
- Total fatalities: 31

Number by magnitude
- 8.0–8.9: 0
- 7.0–7.9: 1
- 6.0–6.9: 7

Date	Country and location	M_{w}	Depth (km)	MMI	Notes	Casualties	
Date	Country and location	M_{w}	Depth (km)	MMI	Notes	Dead	Injured
1	Mexico, Chiapas	6.0	100.0				
4	Japan, south of Hokkaido	6.0	56.0	IV			
11	United Kingdom, Solomon Islands	6.2	35.0	V			
17	United States, Andreanof Islands, Alaska	6.6	25.0				
26	Russian Soviet Federative Socialist Republic, eastern Kamchatka	6.3	65.0				
29	Mexico, Gulf of California	6.6	10.0	VI	Foreshock.		
29	Mexico, Gulf of California	7.2	10.0	VII			
30	Greece, Thessaly	6.7	10.0	X	The 1954 Sofades earthquake 31 people were killed and 717 were injured. 13,356 homes were damaged or destroyed. Costs were $3.15 million (1954 rate).	31	717

=== May ===
May
- Strongest: 6.6 M_{w} Japan
- Total fatalities: 0

Number by magnitude
- 8.0–8.9: 0
- 7.0–7.9: 0
- 6.0–6.9: 8

Date	Country and location	M_{w}	Depth (km)	MMI	Notes	Casualties	
Date	Country and location	M_{w}	Depth (km)	MMI	Notes	Dead	Injured
3	Nicaragua, Masaya Department	6.0	141.3	IV			
5	Mexico, Gulf of California	6.4	10.0	VI			
5	Russian Soviet Federative Socialist Republic, Kuril Islands	6.0	46.4				
13	Mexico, Oaxaca	6.3	62.4	VI			
13	Mexico, Oaxaca	6.0	80.0		Aftershock.		
14	Japan, Gifu Prefecture, Honshu	6.6	245.1				
19	Australia, southeast of New Britain, Papua and New Guinea	6.2	35.0	V			
31	Indonesia, Sumbawa	6.5	150.0				

=== June ===
June
- Strongest: 6.9 M_{w} Indonesia
- Total fatalities: 0

Number by magnitude
- 8.0–8.9: 0
- 7.0–7.9: 0
- 6.0–6.9: 7
- 5.0–5.9: 1

Date	Country and location	M_{w}	Depth (km)	MMI	Notes	Casualties	
Date	Country and location	M_{w}	Depth (km)	MMI	Notes	Dead	Injured
4	Ecuador, Galapagos Islands	6.3	15.0				
6	Indonesia, Papua (province)	6.9	10.0	VII			
7	Australia, New Ireland (island), Papua and New Guinea	6.6	448.5				
12	Fiji	6.5	569.0				
15	Peru, Loreto Region	6.5	119.9				
17	China, Anhui Province	5.3	0.0	VI	A few homes were destroyed. Unknown depth.		
21	Chile, Antofagasta Region	6.6	113.0				
30	Ethiopia, SNNPR	6.0	15.0	VIII			

=== July ===
July
- Strongest: 6.9 M_{w} China
- Deadliest: 6.6 M_{w} Philippines; 13 deaths
- Total fatalities: 13

Number by magnitude
- 8.0–8.9: 0
- 7.0–7.9: 0
- 6.0–6.9: 12

Date	Country and location	M_{w}	Depth (km)	MMI	Notes	Casualties	
Date	Country and location	M_{w}	Depth (km)	MMI	Notes	Dead	Injured
2	Philippines, southeast Luzon	6.6	15.0	IX	13 people were killed and 101 were injured. Some damage was caused.	13	101
3	Belgium, South Kivu, Belgian Congo	6.0	15.0	VII			
3	Indonesia, off the west coast of Java	6.8	60.0	VII			
6	Russian Soviet Federative Socialist Republic, Kuril Islands	6.5	19.1				
6	United States, Nevada	6.8	0.0	VIII	A few people were injured. Some damage was reported. This was the start of several large earthquakes in Nevada over the remainder of the year. Depth unknown.		10+
6	United States, Nevada	6.2	0.0	VII	Aftershock. Depth unknown.		
13	Australia, Bismarck Sea, Papua and New Guinea	6.2	15.0				
18	Russian Soviet Federative Socialist Republic, off the east coast of Kamchatka	6.0	35.0				
18	Japan, off the east coast of Honshu	6.3	55.0	V			
23	Chile, Coquimbo Region	6.1	38.3	VI			
26	Chile, Los Lagos Region	6.3	55.0	VI			
31	China, Inner Mongolia	6.9	25.0	VII	542 homes were destroyed.		

=== August ===
August
- Strongest: 6.7 M_{w} Tonga
- Deadliest: 5.0 M_{w} Iran; 1 death
- Total fatalities: 1

Number by magnitude
- 8.0–8.9: 0
- 7.0–7.9: 0
- 6.0–6.9: 5
- 5.0–5.9: 1

Date	Country and location	M_{w}	Depth (km)	MMI	Notes	Casualties	
Date	Country and location	M_{w}	Depth (km)	MMI	Notes	Dead	Injured
3	Greece, Aegean Sea	6.0	15.0	V			
5	Australia, Morobe Province, Papua and New Guinea	6.2	25.0	VI			
18	Tonga	6.7	156.8				
20	Iran, Persian Gulf	5.0	0.0		1 person was killed and some damage was reported. Unknown depth.	1	
24	United States, Nevada	6.6	0.0	IX	Further damage in the area affected by another large event in early July. Depth unknown.		
30	Russian Soviet Federative Socialist Republic, Kuril Islands	6.0	57.0				

=== September ===
September
- Strongest: 7.0 M_{w} Fiji
- Deadliest: 6.7 M_{w} France; 1,243 deaths
- Total fatalities: 1,243

Number by magnitude
- 8.0–8.9: 0
- 7.0–7.9: 1
- 6.0–6.9: 12

Date	Country and location	M_{w}	Depth (km)	MMI	Notes	Casualties	
Date	Country and location	M_{w}	Depth (km)	MMI	Notes	Dead	Injured
2	United Kingdom, Solomon Islands	6.6	135.0				
4	Indonesia, Papua (province)	6.4	47.9	VI			
4	Taiwan, southeast of	6.0	35.0				
6	Russian Soviet Federative Socialist Republic, off the east coast of Kamchatka	6.3	60.0	VI			
9	France, Chlef Province, Algeria	6.7	15.0	XI	The 1954 Chlef earthquake caused one of the worst disasters to affect the country. 1,243 people were killed and another 5,000 injured. 20,000 homes were destroyed with damage costs reaching $6 million (1954 rate).	1,243	5,000
10	France, Chlef Province, Algeria	6.2	15.0	VII	Aftershock.		
13	Fiji	6.5	178.0				
14	Japan, Ryukyu Islands	6.0	35.0				
15	Fiji	6.7	564.6				
17	Fiji	7.0	256.6				
20	Indonesia, Sulawesi	6.0	50.0	V			
23	Russian Soviet Federative Socialist Republic, east of the Kuril Islands	6.5	20.0				
27	Japan, southern Hokkaido	6.0	60.1	V			

=== October ===
October
- Strongest: 6.8 M_{w} United Kingdom
- Total fatalities: 0

Number by magnitude
- 8.0–8.9: 0
- 7.0–7.9: 0
- 6.0–6.9: 7
- 5.0–5.9: 1

Date	Country and location	M_{w}	Depth (km)	MMI	Notes	Casualties	
Date	Country and location	M_{w}	Depth (km)	MMI	Notes	Dead	Injured
1	United Kingdom, Santa Cruz Islands, Solomon Islands	6.5	35.0		Foreshock.		
3	United Kingdom, Santa Cruz Islands, Solomon Islands	6.8	35.0				
3	United States, Kenai Peninsula, Alaska	6.4	61.5	VIII			
4	United Kingdom, Santa Cruz Islands, Solomon Islands	6.0	20.0		Aftershock.		
14	Indonesia, Barat Daya Islands	6.3	35.0	VI			
17	Mexico, off the west coast of Baja California	6.4	15.0	VI			
21	Guatemala, Santa Rosa Department, Guatemala	6.1	66.0	V			
24	China, Sichuan Province	5.0	0.0	VII	Some homes were damaged and others were destroyed. Unknown depth.		

=== November ===
November
- Strongest: 6.8 M_{w} United States
- Total fatalities: 0

Number by magnitude
- 8.0–8.9: 0
- 7.0–7.9: 0
- 6.0–6.9: 7

Date	Country and location	M_{w}	Depth (km)	MMI	Notes	Casualties	
Date	Country and location	M_{w}	Depth (km)	MMI	Notes	Dead	Injured
2	Indonesia, northeast of Sumbawa	6.7	20.0	VIII	Some homes were damaged.		
12	Mexico, Baja California	6.1	6.0	VIII			
15	United States, Northern Mariana Islands	6.7	189.0				
18	Japan, off the east coast of Honshu	6.0	35.0	V			
23	Russian Soviet Federative Socialist Republic, off the east coast of Kamchatka	6.0	35.0				
25	United States, off the coast of northern California	6.8	10.0	V			
25	Fiji, south of	6.5	643.5				

=== December ===
December
- Strongest: 7.3 M_{w} United States
- Deadliest: 6.5 M_{w} United States; 1 death
- Total fatalities: 1

Number by magnitude
- 8.0–8.9: 0
- 7.0–7.9: 1
- 6.0–6.9: 7

Date	Country and location	M_{w}	Depth (km)	MMI	Notes	Casualties	
Date	Country and location	M_{w}	Depth (km)	MMI	Notes	Dead	Injured
3	Kirghiz Soviet Socialist Republic, Naryn Region	6.0	15.0	VII			
4	Australia, south of New Ireland (island), Papua and New Guinea	6.3	35.0	V			
4	United Kingdom, north of Trinidad	6.1	49.0	VI			
16	United States, central Nevada	7.3	15.0	XII	1954 Nevada earthquake. This was one of the largest events in the state. Some damage was reported. Many aftershocks followed.		
16	United States, central Nevada	6.9	15.0	X	Large aftershock.		
19	Argentina, Jujuy Province	6.6	247.3				
21	United States, northern California	6.5	0.0	VII	1 person was killed and several were injured. Damage was caused with costs being around $2.1 million (1954 rate). Depth unknown.	1	10+
28	Australia, southeast of New Ireland (island), Papua and New Guinea	6.3	35.0	VI			
