= Carboneras Fault =

Strike-slip fault in Spain

The Carboneras Fault or Carboneras Fault Zone is major sinistral (left-lateral) strike-slip fault in the Province of Almería, southern Spain. It has a NE–SW trend and forms part of the Eastern Betic Shear Zone. It extends for about 50 km onshore, but is interpreted to continue offshore into the Alboran Sea for at least a further 90 km. It is thought to be seismically active and movement on the offshore part of this fault may have been responsible for the 1522 Almería earthquake.
