= Santa Cruz del Comercio =

Coordinates: 37°03′42″N 3°58′32″W

- city
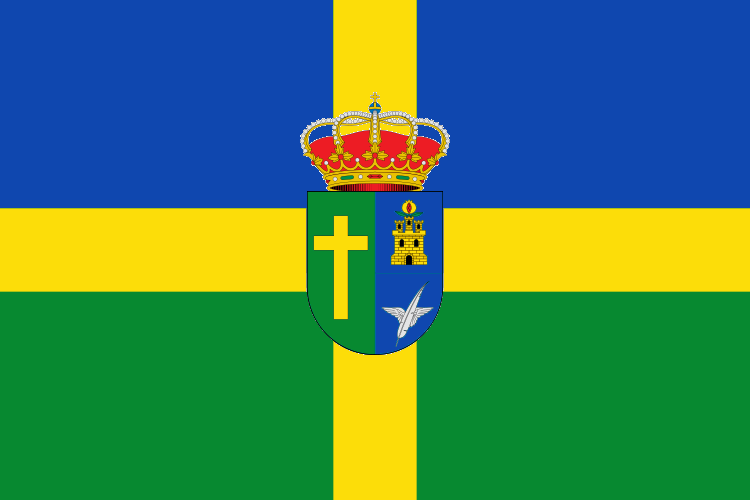
- Flag Coat of arms

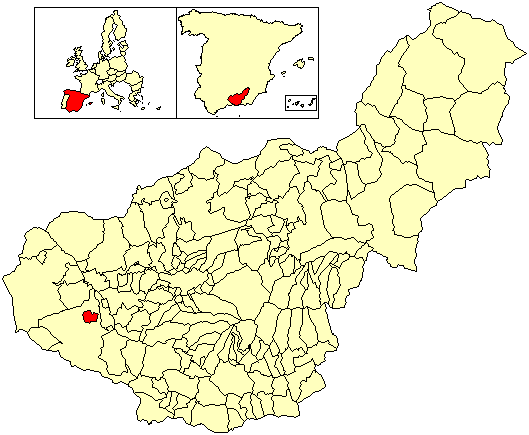
- Location of Santa Cruz del Comercio
- Country: Spain
- Province: Granada
- Municipality: Santa Cruz del Comercio

Area
  - Total: 17 km^{2} (6.6 sq mi)
- Elevation: 739 m (2,425 ft)

Population (2025-01-01)
  - Total: 523
  - Density: 31/km^{2} (80/sq mi)
- Time zone: UTC+1 (CET)
  - Summer (DST): UTC+2 (CEST)

Santa Cruz del Comercio is a municipality located in the province of Granada, Spain. According to the 2005 census (INE), the city has a population of 544 inhabitants.

During the Granadin earthquake of 25 December 1884, more than 70% of the houses collapsed and 20% were severely damaged. There were 13 dead and 19 injured.

== See also ==
- List of municipalities in Granada
