= 1954 Spain earthquake =

Earthquake in Spain

- Location within Spain
- UTC time: 1954-03-29 06:17:07
- ISC event: 890481
- USGS-ANSS: ComCat
- Local date: 29 March 1954
- Local time: 07:17:07 CET
- Magnitude: 7.8 M_{w}
- Depth: 626.2 km (389 mi)
- Epicenter: 36.98°N 3.612°W
- Type: Normal, deep-focus
- Total damage: None
- Max. intensity: EMS-98 V (Strong), MMI V (Moderate)
- Casualties: None

An earthquake struck Granada in southern Spain with a moment magnitude of 7.8 at 07:17:07 local time (06:17:07 UTC) on 29 March 1954. The earthquake had an epicenter in the town of Dúrcal, causing shaking to be felt across Madrid, Tangier, and seismographs detecting the waves in places like Toledo and Stuttgart, West Germany. This remains the largest earthquake with epicenter in mainland Spain by magnitude.

== Geological background ==
Dúrcal sits on the Eurasian plate within the Sierra Nevada range on the Betic Cordillera System formed by the stacking of the Eurasian and Iberian plates, The Cordillera foresees about 1.3 ± 0.3 mm (0.051 ± 0.012 in) per year of fault slip. Dúrcal is located geographically on the Granada Basin and Lecrín Valley. Most fault lines within the Granada Basin are normal faulting, such as Padul - Nigüeras fault line, Zafarraya fault line and Sierra Tejeda fault lines.

Dúrcal also sits within Travertine soil, a soft limestone containing freshwater, mainly coming from the Dúrcal river and enriching the soil with freshwater. As a result, amplification can cause weak but long-period ground motion during large earthquakes.

Notable earthquakes struck the Granada Basin such as 1884, 1956, 2010, 2021 and 2026.

== Mainshock ==
The earthquake struck southern Spain with a moment magnitude of 7.8 and depth of 626.2 km (389.1 mi) at 07:17 CET on 29 March 1954. Shaking was reported across Andalucía (EMS-98 III), Tangier (EMS-98 IV), Taza (IV-V) and other places such as Madrid, Casablanca and Toledo. The earthquake was also registered by the Geophysical Observation of Toledo and in Stuttgart, West Germany. According to various news reports, no damage was observed in any town. The National Geographic Institute released a bulletin report in 1957 stating the earthquake struck the Motril fault, a dip-slip normal fault located within the town of Motril. However, a 1976 research journal paper by Wai-Ying Chu and Hiroo Kanamori postulated that the earthquake was a type of slab-tear event involving detachment or breaking of the Alboran lithosphere in the mantle.

The earthquake was noted for its rarity for being deeper than 500 km (310 mi). In 1949, Beno Gutenberg and Charles Richter initially proposed that deep-focus earthquakes mostly occurred in areas such as the Pacific Rim, and the probability one in the Mediterranean is very low. The earthquake's faulting mechanism was determined to be a normal dip-slip due to the vertical compositioning and the horizontal movement due east. During the 2010 Nigüelas earthquake, another deep-focus event, scientists at University of California found it had a nearly identical focal mechanism with the 1954 event.

== See also ==
- List of earthquakes in Spain
- Deep-focus earthquake
- 1956 Atarfe–Albolote earthquake
