= Ventas de Zafarraya =

- Village
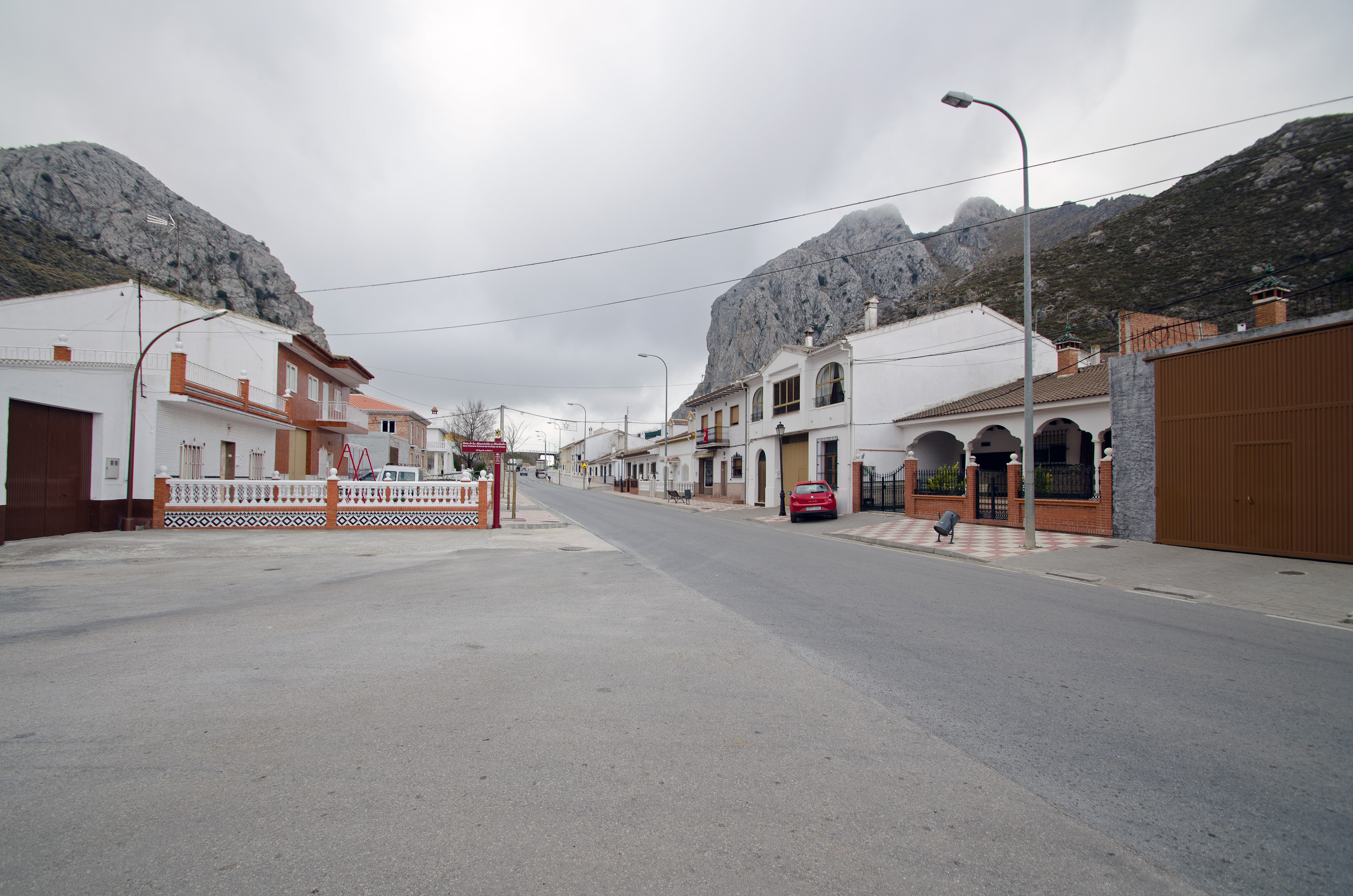

- Flag Coat of arms
- Nickname: Venteños
- Location within Spain
- Coordinates: 36.957434°N 4.120605°W
- Country: Spain
- Autonomous community: Andalusia
- Province: Granada
- Municipality: Alhama de Granada

Area
  - Total: 19.23 km^{2} (7.42 sq mi)
- Elevation: 920 m (3,020 ft)

Population (2019)
  - Total: 1,181
  - Density: 61.41/km^{2} (159.1/sq mi)
- Postal code: 18125
- Website: www.ventasdezafarraya.es

Ventas de Zafarraya is a village in the municipality of Alhama de Granada, Granada, Spain. It is just north of a mountain pass between spurs of the Sierra de Alhama to the west and the Sierra de Tejeda to the east, on the main road from Vélez-Málaga to Alhama de Granada. The village was destroyed by an earthquake in 1884, but was rebuilt.

== Location ==
Ventas de Zafarraya is in the municipality of Alhama de Granada, Granada, Spain. It has an area of 19.23 square kilometres (7.42 sq mi) and is at an elevation of 920 metres (3,020 ft). As of 2019 the population was 1,181. The postal code is 18125. The village is on the road from Alhama de Granada in the west of Granada to Vélez-Málaga in the Axarquía of Malaga. Due to its location on this important route the population grew quickly in the second half of the 20th century.

== History ==
The 40,000 year old bones of a Neanderthal man have been found in the Boquete de Zafarraya cave in Alcaucín, in a spur of the Sierra de Alhama just west of the Sierra de Tejeda. The first historical settlement dates to the Visigothic period of the 6th century A.D., and is known from sites discovered in the center of the village. The name "Zafarraya" is from the Arabic Manzil Fahs Rayya. During the Moorish period the plain was administered from the town of Zalia, since destroyed.

After Zalia was taken by the Christians, for centuries the grazing lands of the plain of Zafarraya were the subject of dispute between the municipalities of Alhama de Granada and Vélez-Málaga. Ventas del Llano de Zafarraya began as a market in the Boquete beside the royal highway from Granada to Málaga. In 1833 it was transferred from the province of Málaga to Granada. In 1842 Ventas de Zafarraya became a municipality.

The Andalusian earthquake of 25 December 1884 had an estimated magnitude of 6.5. There were 745 deaths, and the villages of Arenas del Rey, Ventas de Zafarraya and Alhama de Granada were almost completely destroyed. The epicenter was on the northern side of the Sierra de Tejeda near Ventas de Zefarraya, with a focus 12,300 metres (40,400 ft) deep. The pioneering geologist José Macpherson y Hemas (1839–1902) explained the earthquake as having been caused by movement along the faults that bound the Tejeda / Almijara massif to the north and south. Others thought the cause might have been the collapse of underground cavities. 74 people died in Ventas de Zafarraya. The village was rebuilt almost entirely with money from Cuba, at that time a colony of Spain, and the village became known as "New Havana".

The railway reached the village in August 1922 from Vélez-Málaga. It was meant to continue to Alhama de Granada, but got no further than Ventas de Zafarraya. It was a rack railway so it could climb the slopes to the Boquete at 1,000 metres (3,300 ft) above sea level. A tourist hotel was built below the station, which gave a great boost to the local economy. However, as road transport became more efficient the line became unprofitable and was closed on 12 May 1960. In 1975 the municipality of Ventas de Zafarraya was absorbed by the municipality of Alhama de Granada.

== Sources ==
- "Etapa 8, Canillas de Aceituno - Periana", Caminando por la Historia de la provincia • Gran Senda de Málaga (in Spanish), Diputación de Málaga
- Udías, Agustín (2013), "Development Of Seismology In Spain In The Context Of The Three Large Earthquakes Of 1755, 1884 And 1954", Earth Sciences History, 32 (2), History of Earth Sciences Society: 186–203, doi:10.17704/eshi.32.2.f1168212m214l532, JSTOR 24140011
- "Ventas de Zafarraya Descripción", Andalucia.org (in Spanish), Consejería de Turismo y Deporte de la Junta de Andalucia
- "Ventas de Zafarraya Historia", Andalucia.org (in Spanish), Consejería de Turismo y Deporte de la Junta de Andalucia, archived from the original on 2019-08-19
