= Mariano Belmás Estrada =

Spanish architect

- Born: 17 January 1850; Madrid, Spain
- Died: 16 August 1916 (aged 66)
- Occupation: Architect

Mariano Belmás Estrada (17 January 1850 – 16 August 1916) was a Spanish architect. He was a prominent theoretician of urban planning in Madrid in the late 19th century, particularly in addressing the problem of housing workers as the city modernized and its population grew. He viewed architecture in terms of technical solutions to social problems rather than aesthetics. He was the lead architect in the first year of reconstruction after the 1884 Andalusian earthquake. He was a founder and one of the first architects of the Ciudad Lineal of Madrid, a planned neighborhood. Later he abandoned his youthful idealism and became a successful and respected architect who created eclectic designs of major new buildings and renovations for public and private clients.

== Early years (1850–1875) ==
Mariano Belmás Estrada was born in Madrid on 17 January 1850. His father, Juan Belmás Vidal, was an engineer from Galicia. Mariano studied science and architecture at the Madrid school, and graduated on 16 October 1873. His training during the period of the "Sexenio Democrático" (1868–1874) was influenced by ambitious urban development projects for Madrid proposed by individuals such as Ángel Fernández de los Ríos (1821–1880). His first years after graduating were spent on professional development and theoretical study rather than practice as an architect.

== Theoretician (1875–1885) ==
Belmás became active in the Sociedad Central de Arquitectos (Central Society of Architects), and from 1875 to 1882 was general secretary of the society. In 1876 he became editor of the society's official organ, the Revista de la Arquitectura Nacional y Extranjera (Review of National and Foreign Architecture). The administration's 1878 bill on construction of working-class neighborhoods had raised interest in the subject of urban planning and economical construction. Belmás began to explore the ideas of architectural hygiene and public housing. In 1880 he presented models of compact houses with molded concrete walls, attached to form small blocks, as advocated by urban planners who thought the city plans should be based on small groups of modest houses.

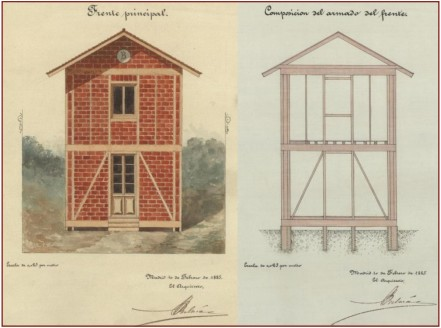
House for the poor in Málaga and Granada, 1885

In 1880 Belmás was given a grant by the state to visit England and Belgium to study worker's housing and low-cost buildings. When he returned he was instrumental in the foundation in 1881 of the Sociedad Española de Higiene (Spanish Hygiene Society), and was secretary of this society for several years. He represented the society at the International Hygiene Congress in Paris in 1885, and in London in 1891. He was named a corresponding member of the French Société Centrale des Architectes and the Royal Institute of British Architects.

Belmás presented his ideas about hygiene, urban planning and economical housing at the first National Congress of Architects in 1881, including the concept of working-class neighborhoods with single-family homes connected to the city using new forms of transport. Also in 1881 he began to advocate economic housing built using the "Belmás system" of modern construction. His radical ideas were opposed at the 1881 congress by conservatives such as Lorenzo Álvarez Capra, and he left the Central Society in 1882. He also left the Revista de la Arquitectura Nacional y Extranjera. (Note: In 1888 the Revista de la Arquitectura Nacional y Extranjera was renamed the Gaceta de Obras Públicas, a private publication, and continued to be published until 1926.) However, he continued to contribute articles to this and other magazines where urban planning, urban hygiene and economic housing were discussed. Belmás was recognized as one of the most advanced theoreticians of architecture and urbanization.

A few experimental economical workers' houses were built in Madrid in the next few years. In 1881–1885 Belmás undertook redesign of the Ministry of Development for the School of Arts and Crafts on the Paseo de la Infanta Isabel, Madrid. In 1882 he founded the Constructora Mutua (Mutual Construction Company), a cooperative for building cheap housing, but lack of money meant that only a few houses were built on what is now the Calle de Bravo Murillo.

== Andalusian earthquake reconstruction (1885–1886) ==
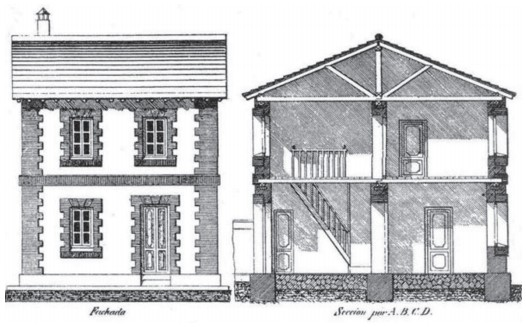
Type 1 house for reconstruction after the 1884 Andalusian earthquake

After the Andalusian earthquake of 25 December 1884, Belmás became an official collaborator with the administration on post-earthquake reconstruction on 26 January. For the rest of the year he worked in Madrid and in the field as the main technical authority for the royal commission. Belmás defined the criteria for the official reconstruction. He was behind a competition announced at the start of February for "housing plans for the communities that must be rebuilt in the provinces of Málaga and Granada." The terms of the competition required the plans to conform to his views on standardized urban architecture. In February 1885 the Ministry of the Interior called for designs by Spanish architects for new houses for the poor, which had to cost no more than 1,500 pesetas and be as strong as possible against future earthquakes.

Belmás submitted his own proposal, following structural principles that had already been partially implemented by José Grases Riera. He called his system an "articulated skeleton". It had a flexible wooden framework filled with economically available materials such as manufactured brick, masonry or adobe to make a "a solid, undeformable, rigid and flexible unit". No foundation was required. Belmás described his design as having perfect connections between all its elements, so even if the floor moved the house could sway but not break. He wrote that "even if the house fell and rolled, its frame would remain locked like a boat that suffered the hard attacks of the raging waves of the sea". The people for whom the houses were intended had doubts about whether the innovative design was strong or functional. Well-known architects such as Francisco Jareño y Alarcón and Juan Monserrat Vergés cast doubts on whether the houses would be adequate for the harsh climate of the region. (Note: Montserrat's the Instituto del Fomento del Trabajo Nacional (Institute for the Promotion of National Labor) later worked closely with the Royal Commission in Granada, where it built low and robust houses with load-bearing walls.)

There is no official record that Belmás won the contest, and some sources say a different proposal was approved, but preparations were made to start building based on his model based on a prototype built in Madrid and the components of some houses were sent to be assembled on site. The five designs by Belmás Estrada followed similar construction techniques and were between 40 and 150 square metres (430 and 1,610 sq ft) in area. The houses had solid foundations, strong frameworks, reinforced corners and other features designed to reduce risk of collapse. Belmás participated in the reconstruction in Alhama de Granada, but was only able to build a small neighborhood. Towards the end of 1885 José Marín-Baldo y Cachia (1826–1891) joined the commission. his experience in rebuilding villages destroyed in the great flood of the Huerta de Murcia in 1880 gave him great authority. Belmás seems to have left the commission in January 1886.

== Housing projects in Madrid (1887–1897) ==
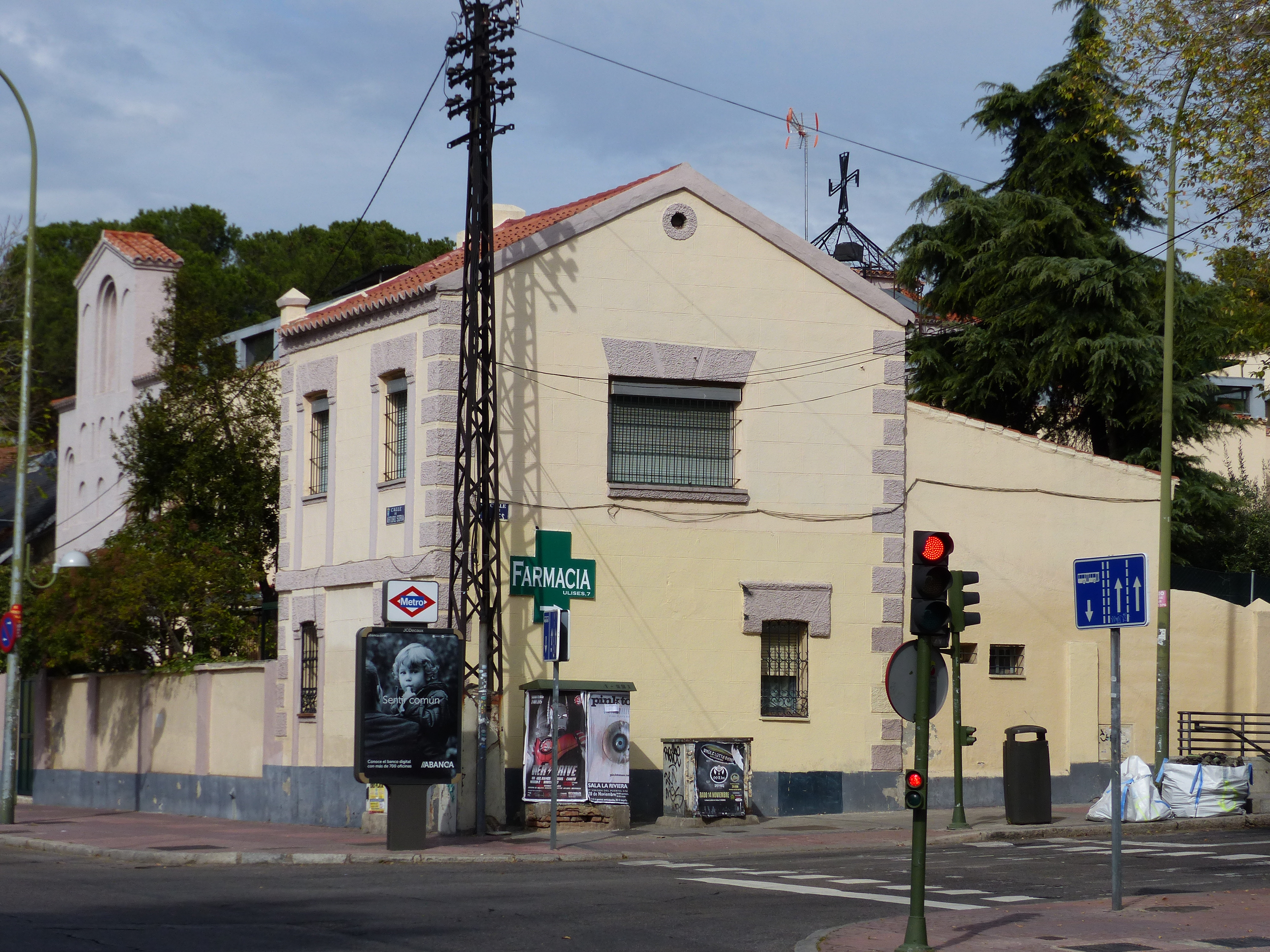
Original house in the Ciudad Lineal. Note the similarity to the 1884 Type 1 House.

In 1887 Belmás tried to manage development of an extension of the Pacífico neighborhood on Madrid, where he built a house for himself, but the project ran into financial problems. Also in 1887 he undertook an extensions of the Palacio de Altamira on the calle de la Flor. His design completed an unfinished part of the facade. (Note: The Altamira Palace is one of the few that managed to survive the remodeling of the street. It was later used as offices and allowed to deteriorate, then remodeled to serve as one of the seats of the School of Design.)

Between 1890 and 1896 Belmás was involved in a speculative development of a neighborhood of townhouses called "Madrid Moderno", which ran into many bureaucratic obstacles. Madrid Moderno was promoted and built between 1890 and 1897 on undeveloped land beyond the eastern boundary of the city. Constructed in phases and designed for middle class families, it had about 100 two-story houses with a small garden in front. The building facades combined brick, wood, metal and ceramics to given an attractive and eclectic appearance. Most of them have since been torn down to make room for more modern buildings.

The La Compañía Madrileña de Urbanización (Madrid Urbanization Company) was established on 3 March 1894 with a capital of 2,500,000 pesetas and 67 kilometres (42 mi) of urban and suburban 1.45 metres (4 ft 9 in) tram lines. It was promoted by Arturo Soria y Mata (1844-1920). Mariano Belmás Estrada was a member of the first board of directors. In 1894 he played a key role in the foundation and initial development of the Ciudad Lineal (Linear City) urban proposal, promoted by this company.

The Ciudad Lineal had the goal of providing a house for every family, with an orchard and a garden, but its architecture ended up classifying families. Belmás designed and built some of the project's main buildings, including the company's offices and different models of houses, including luxury houses. He was a shareholder and member of the board of the company until 1898, when he left after a disagreement with Soria. In 1896 Belmás promoted the first "Festival of Trees" in Madrid.

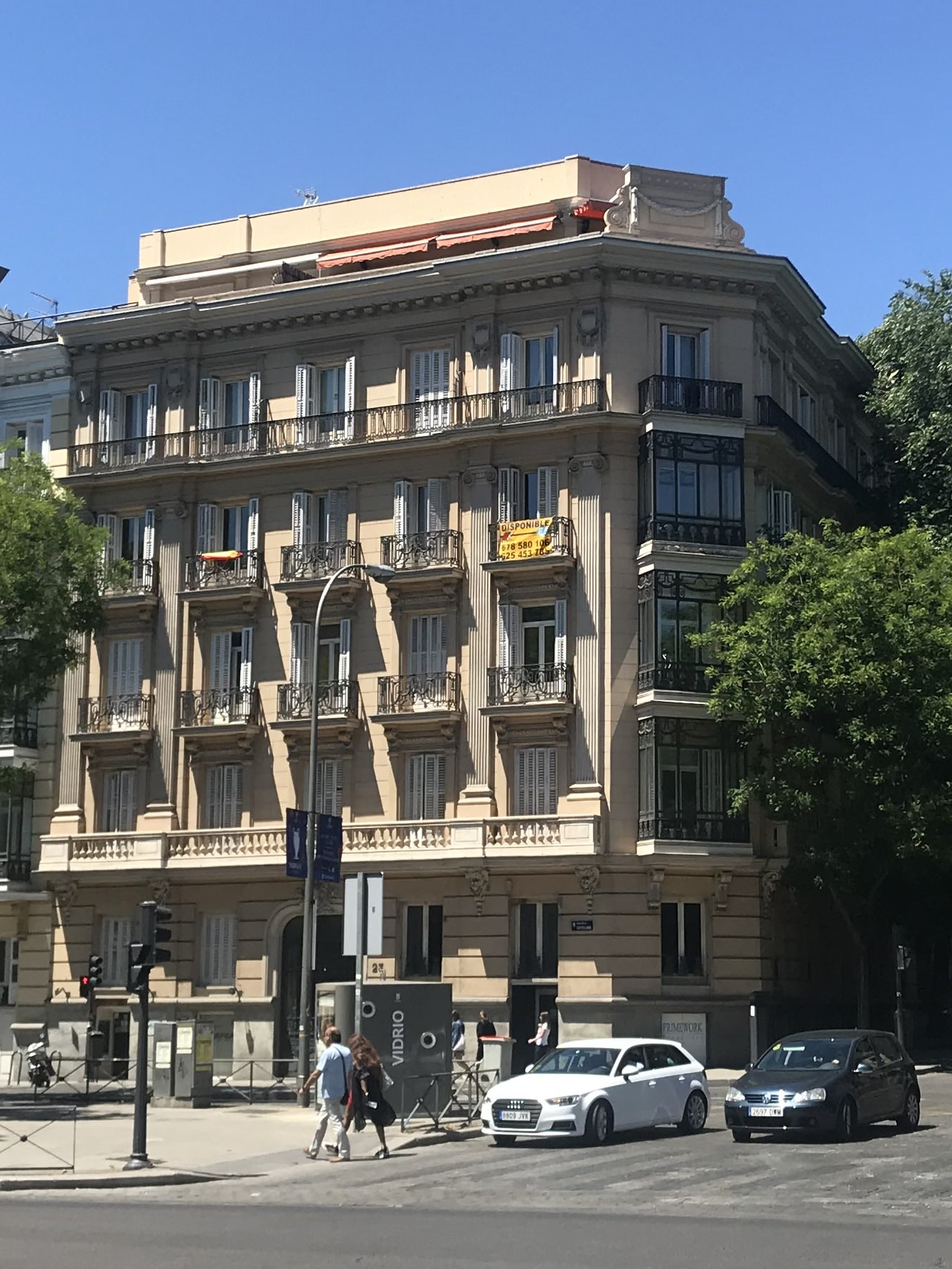
Housing for D. Luis Mitjans

== Last years (1897–1916) ==
Belmás became a member of the Liberal party, and from 1897 to 1906 was a deputy for Madrid. Later he was a senator for the Province of Lugo.

Belmás advised Fernando Navarro in his construction of the Palacete Rodriguez Quegles in Las Palmas, Gran Canaria, a small Art Nouveau place. Navarro completed the proposed design by Belmás in 1900. In the 20th century, turning away from his more idealistic concepts, he executed most of his well-known buildings in variants of the eclectic style. He designed residences for the Marquis de Valdeterrazo in calle Hortaleza (1902–1904), for the Mitjans family on calle Velázquez (1904–1905) and on the Paseo de la Castellana (1907), for Luis de la Mata on Felipe II avenue (1905–1909) and for José Rivas on Calle Lagasca (1911–1914). The last was completed by the architect Francisco Reynals.

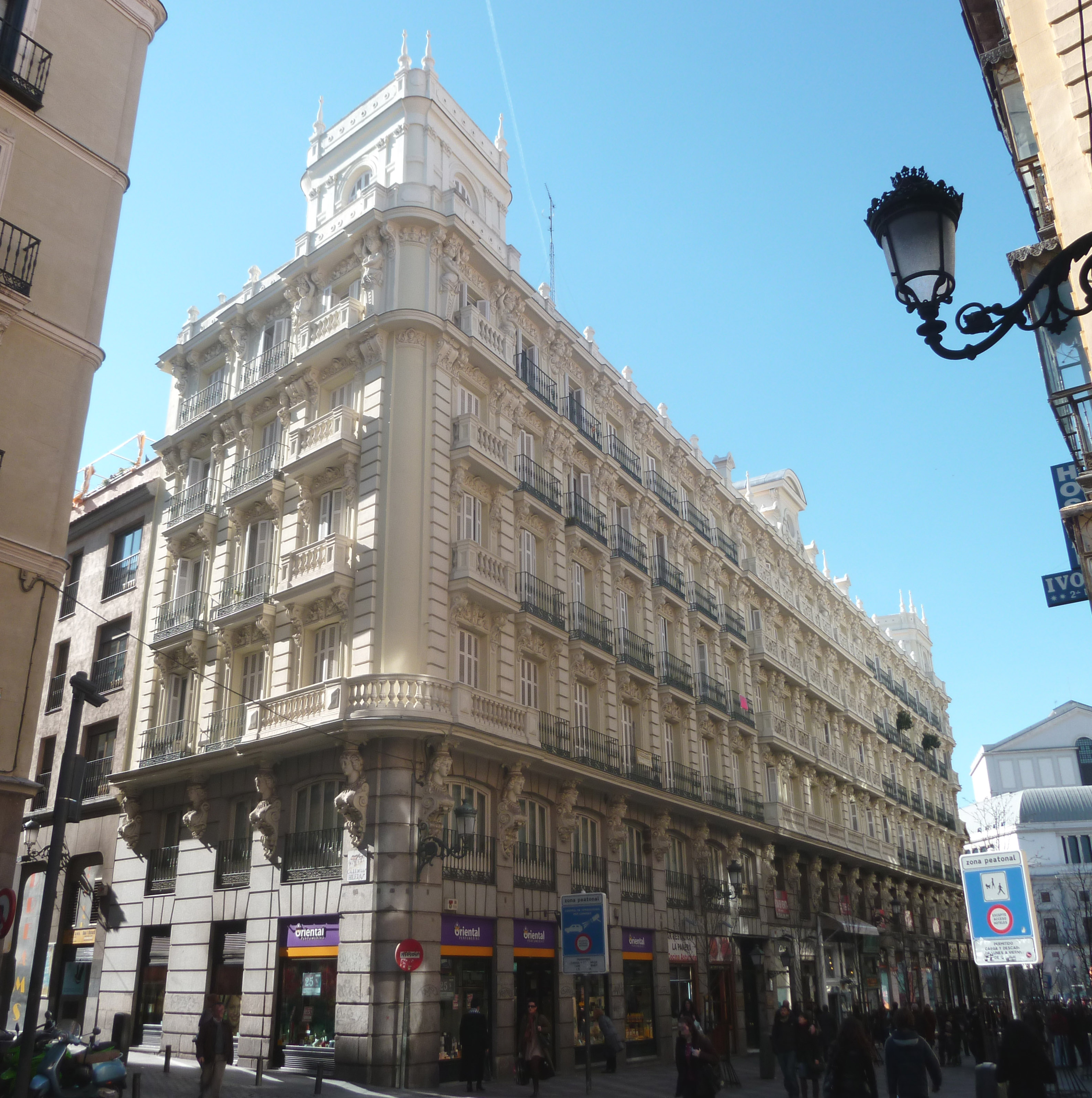
Hotel Internacional, Arenal 19, Madrid

Belmás redesigned Madrid's cosmopolitan Gran Hotel de Arenal. The residential building at Arenal 19 had been designed in 1862 by José Maria Mellado and Máximo de Robles. Belmás Estrada renovated it between 1907 and 1908 to convert it into the International Hotel. He gave the facade everything that was considered to represent French glamour at the time, although the mass of details would be considered of doubtful taste today. In 1909 Belmás restructured the Ave Maria Chapel, the last surviving building of the Trinity Convent in Madrid. He created a new level above the former single floor, and modified the facade to match.

In his last years Belmás had considerable prestige. He was decorated with the Grand Cross of the Order of Isabella the Catholic, and contributed to the 1911 regulations for construction of single-family public houses in Madrid in the early 20th century. Mariano Belmás Estrada died on 16 August 1916. In the 1920s and 1930s architects in Madrid continued to struggle with the problem of viable working class neighborhoods with little more success than Ramón de Mesonero Romanos (1803–1882), Fernández de los Ríos and Mariano Belmás had achieved in the previous century.

== Publications ==
Publications by Mariano Belmás include:

- Mariano Belmás (1881), Las construcciones economicas del sistema Belmás bajo los puntos de vista social, constructivo y económico (Conferencia dada en el Fomento de las Artes el dia 16 de Abril de 1881)
- Mariano Belmás (1882), Discusion acerca de la mortalidad de Madrid
- Mariano Belmas (1887), La Casa: condiciones que debe reunir la vivienda para ser salubre, Consejos populares de higiene, vol. 1, Diario Médico-Farmacéutico, p. 123
- Mariano Belmás (1892), Comentarios á las ordenanzas municipales de Madrid
- Mariano Belmás (1893), La crisis del trabajo y los obreros de Madrid (Conferencia dada en el Centro Instructivo del Obrero)
- Mariano Belmás (1899), Canarias, el peligro y sus remedios : conferencia dada en el Ateneo de Madrid
- Mariano Belmás (1900), Los canales y pantanos y el decreto del ministro de agricultura de 12 de mayo de 1900 (Conferencia dada en el Ateneo de Madrid el día 18 de mayo de 1900)
- Mariano Belmás (1901), El Lazareto de Gando y las Canarias
- Mariano Belmás; Vicente Llorente (1902), Discursos leidos en la sesión inaugural del año académico de 1902-1903 en la Sociedad española de Higiene

== Sources ==
- "Belmás, Mariano", Worldcat
- Burgos Núñez, Antonio; Olmo García, Juan Carlos; Sáenz Pérez, María Paz (25 October 2018), "Las Viviendas Del Terremoto De Andalucía De 1884" (PDF), Biblio3W, XXIII (1.252), Universitat de Barcelona, ISSN 1138-9796
- Capilla y comedor del Ave María, Madrid Destino Cultura Turismo y Negocio
- Casa y Jardín Rodríguez Quegles (in Spanish), Cabildo de Gran Canaria. Sede de Patrimonio Histórico
- Diaz de Liaño Argüelles, Jose Luis; Díez Ortells, Juan Enrique (26 November 2016), Madrid, la capital se hace ciudad: Economía, sociedad y arte en Madrid en los siglos XIX y XX (in Spanish), ECOBOOK, ISBN 978-84-945410-6-3
- "Expediente promovido por Don Mariano Belmás, arquitecto en solicitud de licencia para reconstruir parte de la casa nº 10 de la calle de la Flor Alta (Palacio de Altamira)", memoriademadrid.es (in Spanish), Ayuntamiento de Madrid, 1887
- García-Gutiérrez Mosteiro, Javier (2003), "Lutos en el Madrid Moderno" (PDF), Arquitectura (in Spanish) (334), ISSN 0004-2706
- "History of Palacete rodriguez quegles at Las palmas de gran canaria", Monument Tracker, archived from the original on August 24, 2019
- Navascues Palacio, Pedro; Alonso Pereira, José Ramón (18 October 2002), La Gran Vía de Madrid: Noventa años de la historia de Madrid, Encuentro, ISBN 978-84-7490-667-7
- Óscar da Roc ha Aranda (2018), Mariano Belmás Estrada (in Spanish), Real Academia de la Historia, archived from the original on 2019-08-22
- Peris Torner, Juan (15 March 2012), "Compañía Madrileña de Urbanización – CMU", Ferrocarriles de Espana (in Spanish)
- "Situación en la arquitectura española: Desarrollo", arteHistoria (in Spanish), 2017
- Vidal Sánchez, Francisco (2011), "Terremoto de Alhama de Granada de 1884 y su impacto", Anuari Verdaguer (in Spanish) (19)
