= List of earthquakes in Spain =

This is a list of notable earthquakes that had epicentres in Spain, or significantly affected the country.

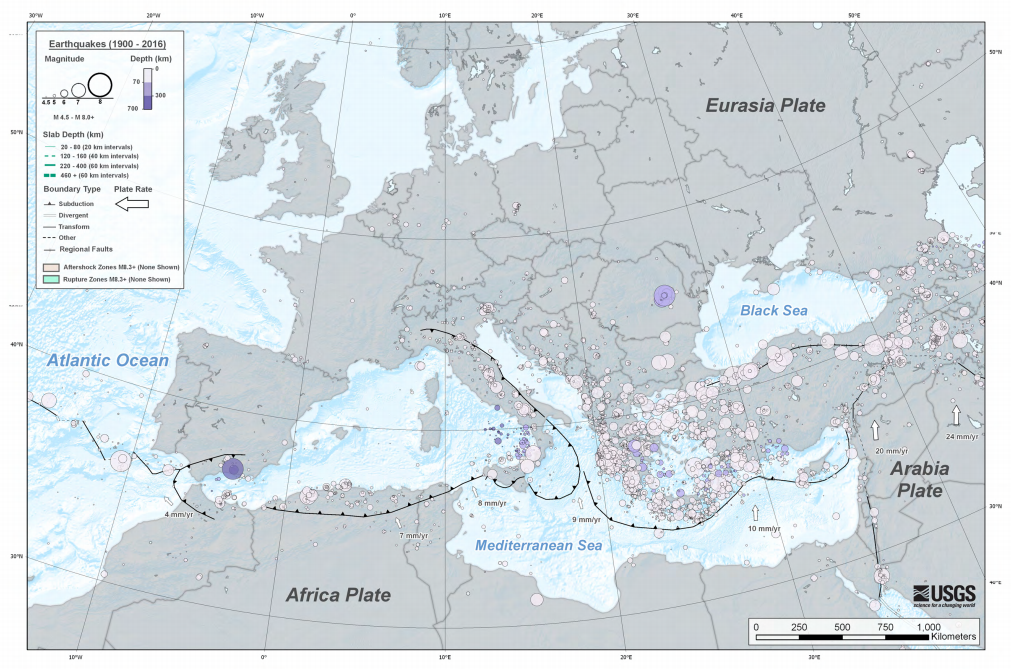
Earthquakes M5.5+ (1900–2016) Mediterranean

== Geology ==
Spain lies on the Eurasian plate just to the north of its boundary with the African plate. The southernmost part of Spain is the zone with the highest seismicity in the country. The African plate is obliquely converging with the Eurasian plate at about 5 mm/year.

== Earthquakes ==
Date	Region	Mag.	MMI	Deaths	Injuries	Notes
2026-08-14	Granada, Andalusia	5.2 M_{w}	VII			Some roofs, façades collapsed, and five churches damaged
2025-07-14	Almería, Andalusia	5.2 M_{w}	V			Clearly felt in large areas of southeastern Spain and northern Africa. The consequences were limited to minor damage and no casualties.
2021-08-12	Granada, Andalusia	4.6 M_{w}	VII			Minor damage
2021-01-28	Granada, Andalusia	4.2 M_{w}	IV			Minor damage
2021-01-26	Granada, Andalusia	4.5, 4.2, 4.4 M_{w}	IV-V			Three earthquakes in a 30-minute period. Minor damages in households. Many people spent the night out in the street.
2021-01-23	Granada, Andalusia	4.2 M_{w}	IV		1	Minor damage/Part of an earthquake swarm
2016-01-25	Alboran Sea	6.3 M_{w}	VI	1	30+	Moderate damage
2011-05-11	Lorca, Murcia	5.1 M_{w}	VIII	9	403	Damage to a clocktower and old buildings
2010-11-04	Granada, Andalusia	6.3 M_{w}	III			609 km depth
2005-01-29	Murcia	4.4 M_{w}	VI			565 houses damaged
1999-02-02	Murcia	4.8 M_{w}	VII		20	Minor damage
1997-05-22	Galicia	5.4 M_{w}	VII	1		Minor damage
1993-12-23	Andalusia	5.3 M_{w}	VII			Minor damage
1956-04-19	Albolote, Granada	5.0 M_{w}	VIII	11		
1954-03-29	Granada, Andalusia	7.8 M_{w}	V			Property damage at Granada, 640 km depth
1884-12-25	Granada, Málaga, Almería	6.7 M_{w}	IX	1,200	3,000+	Heavy damage
1829-03-21	Torrevieja, Alicante	6.6 M_{w}	IX	389	377	More than 2,000 buildings were destroyed
1817-03-18	La Rioja		XI			Heavy damage, felt in Madrid
1806-10-27	Pinos Puente, Granada	5.3 M_{s}	VIII	13		
1804-08-25	Almería	6.4 M_{w}	VIII–IX	1,000	100+	Severe damage
1804-01-13	Motril, Granada	6.7	VII–VIII	2		
1790-10-10	Algeria	6.0–6.5	VIII–IX	3,000		Tsunami reported. Damaging in Spain. All fatalities reported in Algeria.
1755-11-01	Atlantic Ocean	8.5–9.0 M_{w}	XI	10,000–100,000		Major tsunami, widespread damage in southwestern Spain
1748-03-23	Estubeny, Valencia	6.2	IX	38		
1680-10-09	Granada, Andalusia	6.8	VII–IX			
1658-12-31	Almería		VIII–IX			
1644-06-19	Muro de Alcoy, Alicante		VIII	38		
1550-04-19	Almería		VI–X			
1531-09-30	Baza, Granada, Andalusia		VIII–IX			
1522-09-22	Almería	6.8–7.0 M_{w}	X–XI	2,500		
1518-11-09	Vera, Almería		IX	165		
1504-04-05	Carmona, Sevilla	6.8	VIII–IX	32		
1494-01-26	Málaga		VIII			
1431-04-24	Granada, Andalusia	6.8	VIII–IX	1,000		
1428-02-02	Girona, Catalonia	6.7	IX	800		
1373-03-02	Aragon		VIII–IX			
1356-08-24	Cape St Vincent, Portugal		VIII			Damage in Seville
1169	Jaén Andalusia		VIII–IX			
1170	Andújar, Jaén	6.0	VIII–IX			
1048	Alicante, Valencia		VIII			
1024-03-15	South of Spain		VIII–X			
974	Córdoba, Andalusia					
957	Córdoba, Andalusia					
944	Córdoba, Andalusia					
881-06-10	Gulf of Cádiz, Andalusia	7.2				
880	Córdoba, Andalusia	5.7	VIII			
Note: The inclusion criteria for adding events are based on WikiProject Earthquakes' notability guideline that was developed for stand alone articles. The principles described also apply to lists. In summary, only damaging, injurious, or deadly events should be recorded.

== See also ==
- Geology of Spain
- Azores–Gibraltar transform fault
