= 1829 Torrevieja earthquake =

Earthquake in Spain

1829 Alicante earthquake
- Location within Spain
- Local date: 21 March 1829
- Local time: 18:10
- Magnitude: 6.6 M_{w}
- Epicenter: 38.05°N 0.410°W
- Areas affected: Province of Alicante, Spain
- Max. intensity: MMI IX (Violent)
- Casualties: 389 dead 377 injured

The 1829 Torrevieja earthquake occurred near the city of Torrevieja, Province of Alicante of southern Spain on 21 March 1829, and was the most destructive seismic event to affect the Iberian Peninsula in the last 500 years. The main shock occurred at approximately 18:30 local time, causing widespread destruction in the Vega Baja del Segura region of Alicante province and parts of neighbouring Murcia. It had an estimated magnitude of 6.6 M_{w} and a Mercalli intensity of IX (Violent). It severely damaged many cities. The event was named after the city of Torrevieja because it was the largest locality to be affected.

== Seismic sequence ==
Rather than a single event, the disaster represented a complex seismic sequence spanning roughly one year. The sequence began with major earthquakes in September 1828 and continued with aftershocks until September 1829. Four major events stand out within this sequence. On 15 September 1828, a moderate earthquake (intensity VII–VIII) damaged many buildings and was followed by about 300 aftershocks in the first 24 hours. The main shock occurred on 21 March 1829, with epicentral intensity of X, which devastated Torrevieja and numerous towns in the Vega Baja region. Two days later, on 23 March 1829, a strong aftershock further damaged structures and destroyed the towns of Guardamar and San Fulgencio, which had been less affected by the main shock. Finally, on 18 April 1829 (Holy Saturday), a powerful aftershock occurred that was nearly as strong as the main event, further damaging already weakened structures and extending damage to areas such as Cartagena.

== Damage and casualties ==
The earthquake caused significant loss of life and extensive physical damage across the region. According to contemporary reports compiled by José Agustín de Larramendi, who was commissioned by King Ferdinand VII to assess the disaster, the earthquake resulted in at least 389 confirmed deaths and 375 injured. It completely destroyed Torrevieja, Almoradí, Benejúzar, Guardamar and other towns, severely damaged over 5,000 buildings across the region, and destroyed critical infrastructure including four bridges over the Segura River.

The town of Almoradí suffered the highest number of casualties despite not being the epicentre. This was attributed to its narrow streets and multi-storey buildings, which collapsed onto residents attempting to flee. Torrevieja, being a newer settlement with wider streets and predominantly single-storey buildings, experienced fewer casualties despite suffering comparable physical damage.

== Geological effects ==
The earthquake triggered numerous geological phenomena that contributed to the overall destruction. One of the most significant effects was widespread soil liquefaction, particularly along the Segura River. This phenomenon occurs when water-saturated sandy soil temporarily behaves like a liquid during seismic shaking. "Sand volcanoes" or "sand boils" formed as liquefied sand erupted through cracks in the ground, ejecting water, sand, and mud. These eruptions damaged agricultural land as the ejected material was often toxic to vegetation. Numerous ground fissures appeared, particularly along riverbanks and irrigation canals. Changes in water sources were also reported, with variations in the flow of springs and wells in Fortuna, Mula, Jumilla (Murcia) and Tibi, and a new spring appearing in San Fulgencio. Minor rock falls occurred in the hills near Orihuela and Los Garres (Murcia).

The concentration of damage along the Segura River valley was attributed to "site effects", where softer river sediments amplified the seismic waves compared to the surrounding rocky terrain.

== Seismological parameters ==
Modern seismological studies have attempted to reconstruct the parameters of this historical earthquake. While the exact epicentre remains debated, most studies place it either near Torrevieja or along a fault line between Torrevieja and the Segura River valley. The earthquake is believed to have been relatively shallow, with estimates for the hypocentre ranging from 3 to 7 kilometres in depth. Some researchers propose that the earthquake occurred along the San Miguel de Salinas fault system. Although impossible to measure directly, the estimated magnitude ranges from 6.0 to 6.9, with most estimates falling between 6.0 and 6.5 based on historical accounts of damage and geological effects.

== Historical context and significance ==
The 1829 earthquake occurred during a period of already existing seismic activity in the region. Earlier significant earthquakes had struck in 1802, 1822, and 1823, potentially weakening structures before the 1829 sequence. Contemporary documents indicate that some towns, such as Guardamar, had not yet fully repaired damage from the 1823 earthquake when the 1829 disaster struck. The earthquake occurred during the reign of Ferdinand VII and led to significant reconstruction efforts directed by the engineer José Agustín de Larramendi.

The earthquake remains significant as a reference for understanding seismic risk in southeastern Spain and has been extensively studied due to the relatively abundant historical documentation available. The detailed accounts of damage and geological effects have allowed researchers to create isoseismal maps (contours of equal shaking intensity) and estimate focal parameters of the event.

== Legacy ==
The earthquake led to one of Spain's first planned reconstruction programmes, with new settlements designed to withstand future earthquakes. Towns such as Torrevieja, Almoradí, Guardamar, and Benejúzar were rebuilt with wider streets and buildings of limited height, incorporating early seismic-resistant design principles. This urban planning transformation represents one of the earliest examples of earthquake-resistant urban design in Europe. The reconstruction plan developed by Larramendi became a model for subsequent disaster recovery efforts in Spain and influenced the development of modern urban planning in the region.

== See also ==
- List of earthquakes in Spain
- 1884 Andalusian earthquake
