= 1522 Almería earthquake =

Earthquake in Almeria, Spain

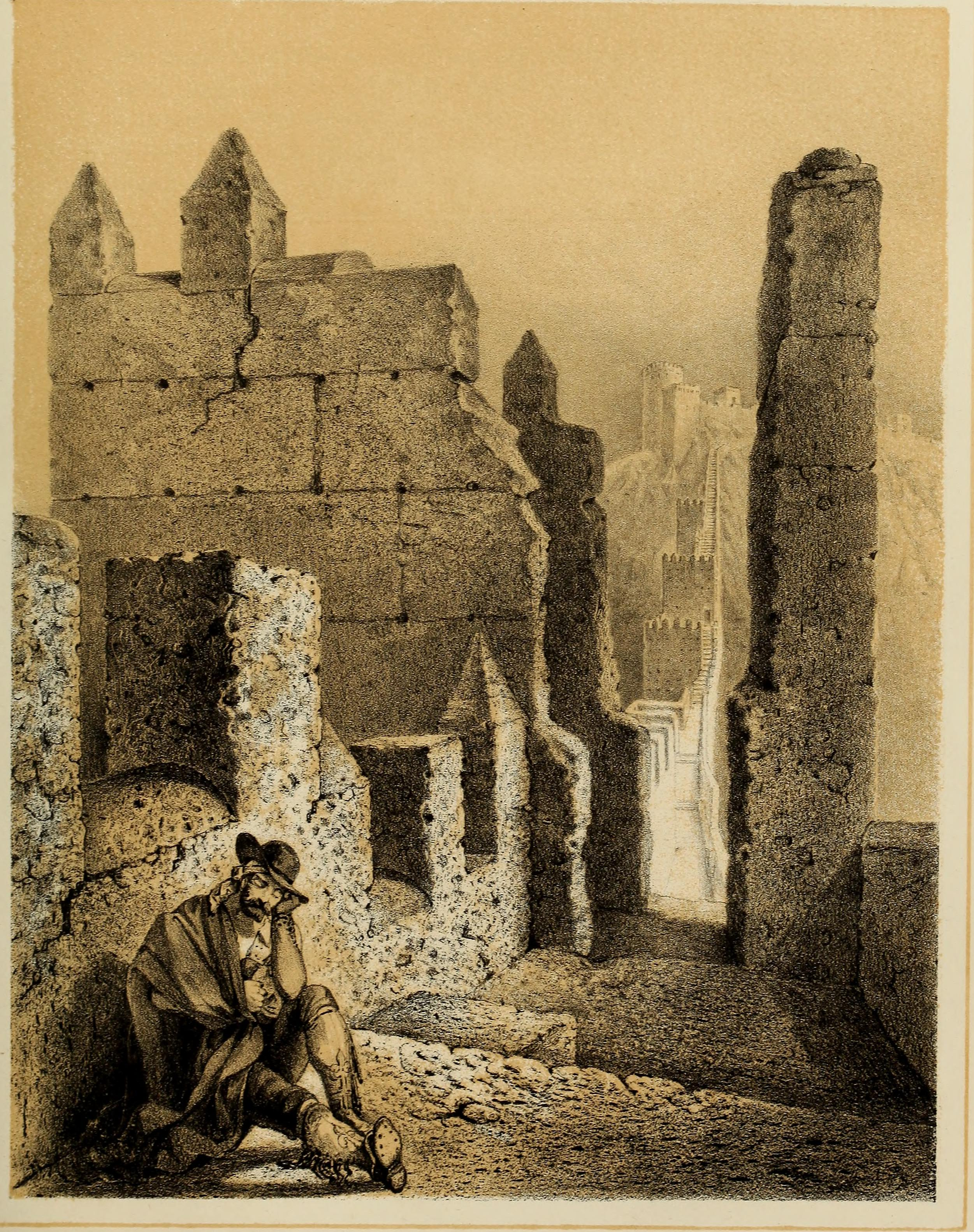
- 1850 illustration of the 1522 earthquake

- Location within Spain
- Local date: 22 September 1522
- Local time: 13:40
- Magnitude: 6.8–7.0 M_{w}
- Depth: 1.0 km (0.62 mi)
- Epicenter: 36.59°N 2.39°W
- Areas affected: Almería, Spain
- Max. intensity: MMI X (Extreme) – MMI XI (Extreme)
- Casualties: 2,500 dead

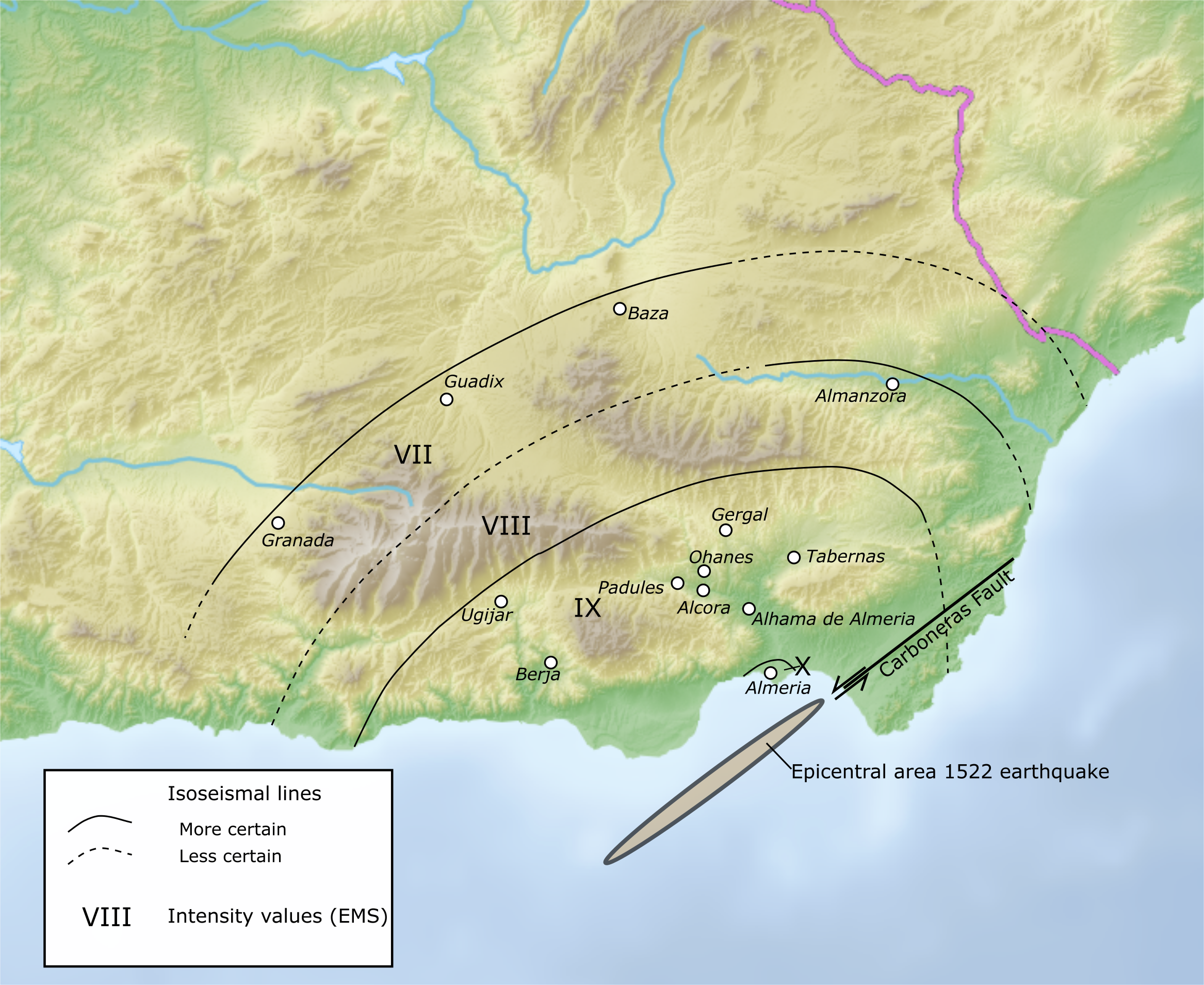
Isoseismal map for the 1522 Almeria earthquake, intensity on the European macroseismic scale

The 1522 Almería earthquake (Spanish: Terremoto de Almería de 1522) was a major seismic event estimated to be 6.8–7.0 M_{w} that occurred on 22 September. The epicenter was in the capital of Almeria in the Andarax Valley, near Alhama de Almería. It had a maximum felt intensity of X–XI (Extreme) on the European Macroseismic Scale (EMS), and killed about 2,500 people, making it among the most destructive seismic events in Spanish history.

The city of Almería was destroyed, and there was serious destruction in 80 other towns. In Granada large cracks were observed in various walls and towers. Some damage also occurred at the Alhambra, more than 100 kilometers away from the epicenter.

== Impact and casualties ==
The earthquake devastated Almería city and numerous surrounding villages, causing approximately 1,000 fatalities according to official records, though some historical accounts suggest the death toll may have reached 2,500. The catastrophic damage included the destruction of Almería's castle, cathedral, convent, medina (old town), and harbour. Major structural damage was also reported in Granada, where the Alhambra palace was affected, as well as in the towns of Guadix, Baza, Ugíjar, and Almanzora.

== Secondary effects ==
The earthquake triggered numerous landslides that blocked roads between Granada and Almería. Several springs experienced changes in their discharge rates, and the Río Andarax temporarily dried up. Historical evidence, including a contemporaneous German woodcut from 1523, suggests the earthquake may have caused flooding and tsunami-like waves that affected coastal areas, possibly contributing to the destruction of Almería's harbour.

== Geological context ==
The earthquake probably occurred along the offshore section of the Carboneras Fault Zone (CFZ) in the Gulf of Almería. The CFZ is a major left-lateral strike-slip fault that extends at least 100 kilometres offshore and forms part of the Trans-Alborán Shear Zone in the western Mediterranean. This region marks the convergent boundary between the African and Eurasian tectonic plates.

High-resolution seafloor imaging has revealed evidence of relatively fresh fault escarpments, fissures, and seafloor ruptures along a segment of the CFZ in the Gulf of Almería. These features, along with signs of submarine landslides and mass wasting deposits, suggest a major offshore earthquake occurred in the area's recent geological history.

== Historical confusion ==
Some historical accounts have confused this event with another earthquake that occurred on 22 October 1522 in Vila Franca do Campo on São Miguel Island in the Azores, leading to uncertainty about the exact epicentral area of the Almería earthquake.

== Significance for seismic hazard assessment ==
The identification of this offshore fault rupture has important implications for seismic hazard assessment in the western Mediterranean region. Prior to recent marine surveys, no onshore surface ruptures associated with the 1522 earthquake had been found. The evidence of significant offshore faulting suggests that active submarine fault zones in the Alborán Sea may pose specific seismic and tsunami hazards for coastal communities throughout the region.

== See also ==
- 1804 Almería earthquake
- Carboneras Fault
- List of earthquakes in Spain
