= Palacete Rodriguez Quegles =

Palacete Rodríguez Quegles
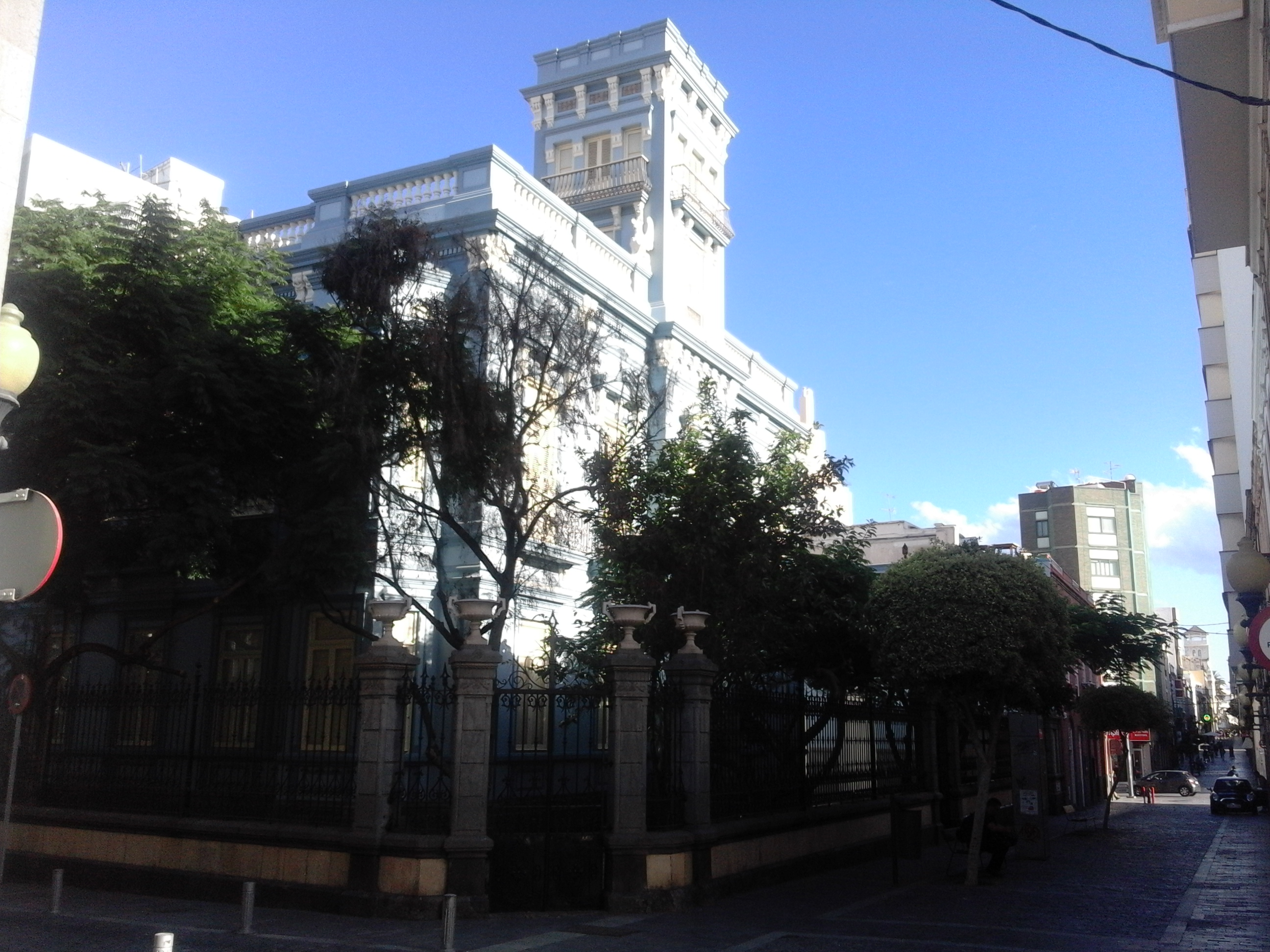
- Palacete Rodríguez Quegles, 4 November 2016

- Location within Province of Las Palmas Location within Canary Islands Location within Spain, Canary Islands

General information
- Type: Mansion / Small palace
- Location: Las Palmas, Gran Canaria, Spain
- Coordinates: 28.105657°N 15.418439°W
- Completed: 1900

Design and construction
- Architects: Mariano Belmás Estrada, Fernando Navarro y Navarro
- Designations: Monument ARI-51-0007111-00000

The Palacete Rodríguez Quegles is a mansion, or small palace, in Las Palmas, capital of Gran Canaria island, in the Canary Islands of Spain. It was built around 1901 as an elaborate residence for a wealthy businessman, then in 1972 sold to the city of Las Palmas for use as a music conservatory. The restored building is now a cultural center.

== Construction ==
The Palacete Rodríguez Quegles is at the corner of Pérez Galdós and Perdomo streets on a lot that held the orchard of the old Monastery of the Concepción Bernarda. Juan Rodríguez Quegles was a well-known lawyer, merchant, landowner and president of the Mercantile Society. He had been born in Fuerteventura but then moved to Gran Canaria, from where he ran large businesses. He loved European culture. He conceived the sumptuous palace as a gift of love to his wife, María Teresa González Díaz. He had promised her the most beautiful house in the city.

The palace was built in the modernist style. The work was assigned to the Madrid architect Mariano Belmás Estrada. Belmás advised Fernando Navarro y Navarro. Navarro finally took over and executed the project. Construction started in 1900. There is no record of the year of completion. The resulting mansion was completely eclectic in style, with foreign architectural and decorative styles typical of the tastes of the bourgeois of that period. It is one of the most interesting buildings of the Triana neighborhood.

== Usage ==
The social and economic changes in the years that followed made it difficult for the heirs of Rodríguez Quegles to maintain the building, and it seemed inevitable that it would deteriorate and be ruined. The City Council of Las Palmas de Gran Canaria bought the building in 1972 to house the Higher Conservatory of Music^{[sp]}, and adapted it to this new use. After 16 years it could no longer accommodate the school's growing number of students, and the building was closed again.

In 1990 the City Council transferred it to the Canary Islands Ministry of Culture. Restoration revealed Venetian stucco, frescoes, tapestries and marbles, which had been hidden but were restored to their original state. The technicians restoring the exterior had to rely on the memories of the older neighbors to determine that it had been green. On 12 September 1991 the General Directorate of Culture designated the palace as a historical-artistic monument, or Property of Cultural Interest.

The palace was occupied in turn by the Ministry of Education and Culture, the General Directorate of Universities and Research and the Canary Islands Academy of Language. The palace today is used as an exhibition space and as a center for coordinating cultural activities in the city by the CreActiva project of the City Council. As of 2020 it was the headquarters of the Las Palmas de Gran Canaria International Film Festival and the Philharmonic Society.

== Sources ==
- "BOC Nº 137. Viernes 18 de Octubre de 1991 - 1491", Boletin Oficial de Canarias (in Spanish), 12 September 1991
- Casa y Jardín Rodríguez Quegles (in Spanish), Cabildo de Gran Canaria. Sede de Patrimonio Histórico
- "El palacete Rodríguez Quegles, nuevo "foco de iniciativas culturales"", La Provincia (in Spanish), Editorial Prensa Canaria, 6 March 2015
- "History of Palacete rodriguez quegles at Las palmas de gran canaria", Monument Tracker, archived from the original on August 24, 2019
- "Palace Rodríguez Quegles", Sitio Turístico Oficial de Las Palmas de Gran Canaria (in Spanish)
- Palacete Rodríguez Quegles (in Spanish), LPA Cultura
- Villegas, Vicente, El Palacete Rodríguez Quegles (in Spanish), ULPGC. Biblioteca Universitaria
