= 1954 Adelaide earthquake =

Earthquake affecting Adelaide, South Australia

- Location within Australia
- UTC time: 1954-02-28 18:10
- ISC event: n/a
- USGS-ANSS: n/a
- Local date: 1 March 1954
- Local time: 03:40 am
- Magnitude: 5.6 M_{w}
- Depth: 4 km (2.5 mi)
- Epicenter: 35.030°S 138.557°E
- Fault: Eden-Burnside Fault
- Areas affected: Australia
- Max. intensity: MMI VIII (Severe)
- Tsunami: No
- Casualties: 16 injured

The 1954 Adelaide earthquake had its epicentre at Darlington, a suburb of the city of Adelaide in South Australia, some 12 km (7.5 mi) to the south of the Adelaide city centre. The quake took place at 3:40 am in the early morning of 1 March 1954 and had a reported magnitude of 5.6. An area of more than 700 km^{2} sustained an intensity greater than V on the Mercalli intensity scale.

== Geology ==
As Australia lies in the middle of a tectonic plate, South Australia is relatively stable geologically. However, South Australia is the second most earthquake-prone of the Australian states with around 3–4 tremors each day. Most tremors are of a magnitude below 2.5, and so noteworthy only to seismologists. Since they are dispersed fairly evenly across the state, most occur well away from centres of human population. The 1954 Adelaide earthquake differed because of its magnitude, which made it the fourth most intense earthquake reported in the state since settlement in 1836, and because it occurred in an area of dense human settlement.

The quake is thought to have started along the Eden-Burnside fault line, which is essentially the Hills face zone, at a depth of 4 km. However, due to a lack of instruments at the time, this is uncertain. Due to the Adelaide plains being primarily heavy clay, amplification of the tremor was reduced, resulting in less damage than a quake of this size would be expected to cause in a metropolitan area. There were no reported fatalities, and 16 reported injuries.

== Damage ==
The total cost of the damage was estimated at £17 million (2022: $1332 million), but only £3 million (2022: $235 million) was paid out in insurance for 30,303 claims, covering around 22% of the damaged buildings. Adelaide in 1954 was still subject to wartime rationing, and most damaged property was uninsured. The earthquake was the most destructive earthquake in recorded Australian history until 1989, when it was eclipsed by the 5.6 Richter magnitude Newcastle earthquake, which caused $4 billion damage, killed 13 people, and injured 160.

One of the settlement's earliest buildings, the Victoria Hotel in Hindley Street, suffered partial collapse. Other major buildings severely damaged included the local Catholic cathedral, St Francis Xavier Cathedral, the General Post Office clock tower, and a newly completed hospital in Blackwood which sustained major damage in all its wards and offices (though an operating theatre survived). The Wakefield Street Private Hospital was damaged to the tune of £600, which was not covered by insurance.

The Britannia statue in Pirie Street was badly damaged, and since it had also been similarly damaged in the 1897 Beachport and 1902 Warooka earthquakes, the clock in the statue was permanently removed.

Outside of Adelaide there was little damage. The Troubridge Island Lighthouse off the south east corner of Yorke Peninsula, 83 km west of Adelaide across the Gulf St Vincent, shut down after the quake damaged its generator, while the Cape St Albans Lighthouse on Kangaroo Island began flashing irregularly.

== See also ==
- List of earthquakes in 1954
- List of earthquakes in Australia
