= 1804 Almería earthquake =

Natural disaster affecting southern Spain

- Location within Spain
- Local date: 25 August 1804
- Local time: 8:25 pm (CET)
- Magnitude: 6.2–6.4 M_{w}
- Epicenter: 36.9°N 2.4°W
- Areas affected: Spain
- Max. intensity: EMS-98 IX (Destructive)
- Casualties: 400 dead

The 1804 Almería earthquake was a highly destructive seismic event in the Province of Almería, southern Spain. It occurred on 25 August at 8:25 pm local time. The mainshock had a maximum intensity assigned VIII–IX on the European macroseismic scale (EMS), and an estimated moment magnitude of 6.2–6.4 M_{w}. At least 400 people were reported killed.

== Tectonic setting ==
Southern Spain is located within a zone of compression caused by the complex convergence between the Nubian and Iberian plates. The plate boundary location remains poorly defined. Seismicity is high in a 400 km (250 mi) zone known as the Eastern Betics Shear Zone. Moderately large earthquakes greater than magnitude 4.5 are infrequent, but have been destructive. Almería experienced heavy damage during the earthquakes of 1487, 1522, 1658, 1804 and 1910. The earthquakes associated with these faults display reverse and left-lateral slip.

== Earthquake ==
Earthquakes in the Almería region are associated with shallow faulting on northwest–southeast and north–south trending faults. Prior to the mainshock in August, a strong earthquake was also reported in the region on 13 January 1804. It had an approximate epicenter 30–40 km (19–25 mi) south–southwest of Motril. The town sustained damage that corresponded to VII–VIII on the EMS scale. It had a moment magnitude estimated to be 6.3. Based on the macroseismic data available, the approximate epicenter would likely be in the Alboran Sea or near the heavily damaged town of Dalías. The offshore epicenter location was given as 36.6°N, 2.8°W, while the onshore location was 36.80°N, 2.85°W, with moment magnitudes of 6.2 and 6.4, respectively.

== Damage ==
The town of Dalías experienced the greatest damage and loss. All the buildings in the town were destroyed, and 267 people were killed. Damage corresponded to VIII–IX on the EMS scale. Within 45 minutes of the mainshock, three strong aftershocks and many weaker ones were felt. Five shocks were felt at Albuñol. Homes were damaged in Rochetta. A total of 2,500 homes were heavily damaged or destroyed and over 4,000 were slightly damaged.

In Berja, homes collapsed, while the walls and towers of churches toppled. An estimated 36–45 people died in the town. Many were killed while fleeing from buildings. In the flat plains, heavy damage was reported, many buildings were left in a state of ramshackle. The Temple of the Annunciation, a parish in the city, as well as several buildings were in shambles.

The city of Almería was subjected to VII intensity shaking, causing buildings to crack. Many residents became fearful, and the local government had to impose new regulations to maintain orderly conduct. Saint Stephen's Day festivities were prohibited due to debris on the streets.

Four deaths and many injuries were recorded in Canjáyar. A total of 60 homes were destroyed. In the aftermath, 120 additional homes and a church were to be demolished. Collapses also occurred in Roquetas de Mar, where the seismic intensity was evaluated to be VIII. The town hall and church sustained cracks on its floors. The church of Adra was damaged but remained open. The two upper sections of the church were demolished and reconstructed.

Significant damage was observed in the Alpujarras. At Turón, homes had to be demolished. Many structures in Albuñol were affected, including the towers of a church. Fissures and landslides occurred on the nearby mountainsides. However, there were only two injuries. One home was destroyed in Ohanes. Landslides caused additional damage to buildings.

According to government information, the official death toll was 173, but a work published by Instituto Geográfico Nacional suggested the actual death toll exceeded 200. A total death toll of 400 was totaled in the towns of Berja, Canjáyar, Roquetas de Mar and Dalías. The Gaceta de Madrid cited a death toll of 407. The heavy losses resulted in the government granting tax exemptions to the populations of Almería, Berja, Dalias, Vícar, Roquetas, Canjáyar, Adra, Ugíjar, Motril and Turón.

== See also ==
- List of earthquakes in Spain
