= Canjáyar =

Canjáyar, Spain
- Flag Coat of arms
- Interactive map of Canjáyar, Spain
- Coordinates: 37°00′N 2°44′W
- Country: Spain
- Community: Andalusia
- Municipality: Almería

Government
  - Mayor: Francisco Alonso Martínez

Area
  - Total: 67 km^{2} (26 sq mi)
- Elevation: 618 m (2,028 ft)

Population (2025-01-01)
  - Total: 1,139
  - Density: 17/km^{2} (44/sq mi)
- Time zone: UTC+1 (CET)
  - Summer (DST): UTC+2 (CEST)

Canjáyar is an agricultural town in Almería province, in the autonomous community of Andalusia, Spain. It is situated along the river Andarax in the Alpujarra region of Almería 47 kilometers from the provincial capital, Almería. The mild climate in Canjáyar makes it a year-round tourist destination. Canjáyar is found at the foot of Sierra Nevada, looking over into the Sierra de Gádor. Surrounded by orchards, which are themselves served by a system of hundred year old aqueducts.

The town has held a yearly Holy Cross festival on April 19 since 1601.

== Symbols ==
Both the town flag and the coat of arms depict a golden sheaf of wheat on an azure background.

== Climate ==
Canjáyar has a Mediterranean climate with a continental influence. Annual rainfall rarely exceeds 300 mm. Summers are hot and dry, with highs that can reach 40 °C, and even 45 °C on rare occasions. Winters are cool, with temperatures typically range between 0 °C and 15 °C. Frosts are rare in the town, but are more common in the surrounding mountains.

== History ==
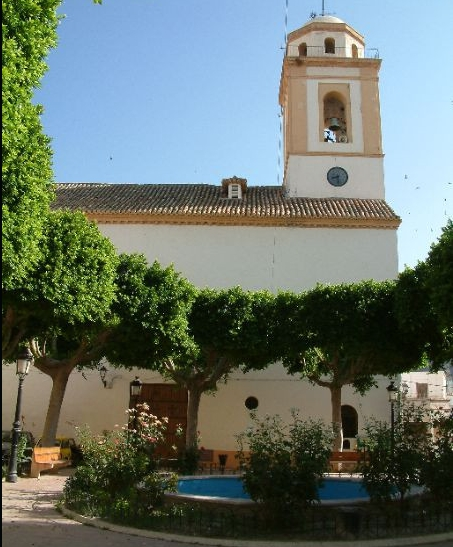
Church of Santa Cruz.

=== Prehistory and Ancient ===
Bronze Age remains have been found in nearby Nieles Cave. There is also evidence of Roman era agriculture.

=== Medieval and Modern ===
The first mention of this town was from the Arab geographer, Al-Idrisi. The 10th century Qansayar mentioned that it had a defensive fortification. Later, in the 14th and 15th centuries, Canjáyar enjoyed a prosperous economy benefiting from its access to water. Agriculture and herding remained the foundation of the town's economy until the advent of lead mining in the late 18th century. The town went through an economic boom in 1835 with the introduction of the table grape and the development of irrigation projects that increased the amount of arable land. At the turn of the 20th century the population had grown to about 3000, around twice the present number. Contemporary agricultural crops are more diverse, and include grains, olives, and fruit.

== See also ==
- List of municipalities in Almería
