= Jayena =

- city
- Flag Coat of arms

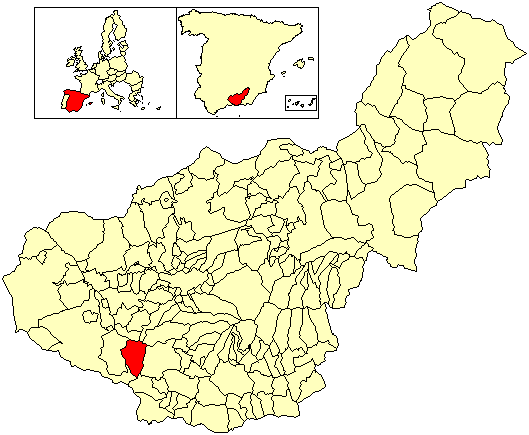
- Location of Jayena
- Coordinates: 36°57′N 3°49′W
- Country: Spain
- Province: Granada
- Municipality: Jayena

Area
  - Total: 80 km^{2} (31 sq mi)
- Elevation: 912 m (2,992 ft)

Population (2025-01-01)
  - Total: 979
  - Density: 12/km^{2} (32/sq mi)
- Time zone: UTC+1 (CET)
  - Summer (DST): UTC+2 (CEST)

Jayena is a municipality located in the province of Granada, Spain. According to the 2005 census (INE), the city has a population of 1237 inhabitants.

The village is just north of the Sierras of Tejeda, Almijara and Alhama Natural Park.

During the Andalusian earthquake of 25 December 1884 more than 58% of the houses were destroyed, and the rest were badly damaged. 10 to 11 deaths were reported, a number that later rose to 17, and 18 were seriously injured. 87 aftershocks were felt from December 25, 1884 to January 16, 1885.

== See also ==
- List of municipalities in Granada
