= Escúzar =

Escúzar, Spain
- city
- Flag Coat of arms

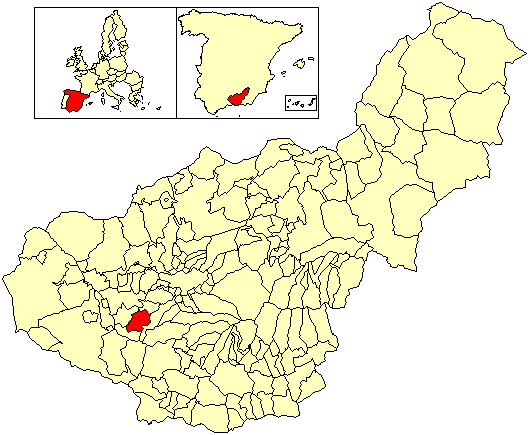
- Location of Escúzar
- Coordinates: 37°03′N 3°45′W
- Country: Spain
- Province: Granada
- Municipality: Escúzar

Area
  - Total: 46 km^{2} (18 sq mi)
- Elevation: 866 m (2,841 ft)

Population (2025-01-01)
  - Total: 826
  - Density: 18/km^{2} (47/sq mi)
- Time zone: UTC+1 (CET)
  - Summer (DST): UTC+2 (CEST)

Escúzar is a municipality located in the province of Granada, Spain. According to the 2005 census (INE), the city has a population of 785 inhabitants.

== See also ==
- List of municipalities in Granada
