= Arenas del Rey =

- Municipality
- Flag Coat of arms

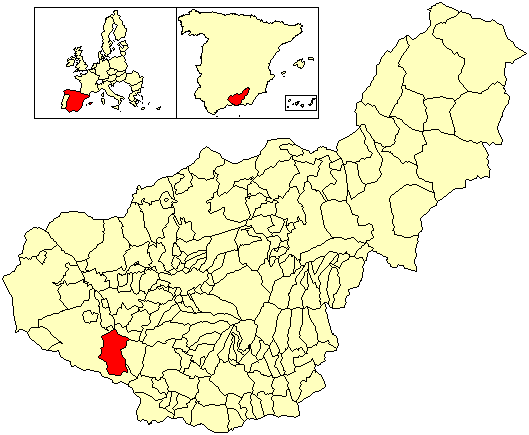
- Location of Arenas del Rey
- Coordinates: 36°57′28″N 3°53′59″W
- Country: Spain
- Autonomous community: Andalusia
- Province: Granada
- Comarca: Comarca de Alhama

Area
  - Total: 116 km^{2} (45 sq mi)
- Elevation: 874 m (2,867 ft)

Population (2025-01-01)
  - Total: 608
  - Density: 5.24/km^{2} (13.6/sq mi)
- Time zone: UTC+1 (CET)
  - Summer (DST): UTC+2 (CEST)

Arenas del Rey is a village located in the province of Granada, Spain. According to the 2006 census (INE), the city had a population of 1,231 inhabitants.

The village is just north of the Sierras of Tejeda, Almijara and Alhama Natural Park.

Arenas del Rey was the worst affected village in the Andalusian earthquake of 25 December 1884. Almost 90% of the houses collapsed, and the rest were badly damaged. The whole village was a pile of rubble. The church and all other public buildings were destroyed. There were 135 deaths and 253 people were injured. The snowfall that followed caused up to three more deaths per day for over a week.

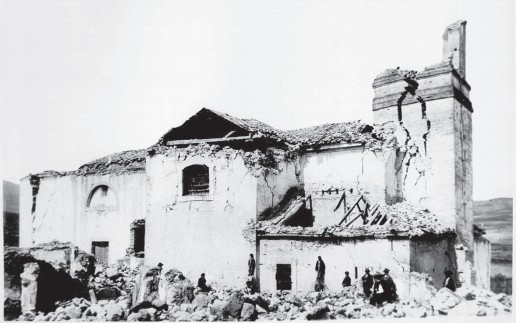
The church in Arenas del Rey after the earthquake

== See also ==
- List of municipalities in Granada
