= Ventas de Huelma =

- municipality
- Coat of arms

- Location in Spain.
- Coordinates: 37°04′N 3°49′W
- Country: Spain
- Province: Granada
- Comarca: Alhama

Government
  - Mayor: Luis Miguel Ortiz Arévalo

Area
  - Total: 42.44 km^{2} (16.39 sq mi)
- Elevation: 854 m (2,802 ft)

Population (2025-01-01)
  - Total: 667
  - Density: 15.7/km^{2} (40.7/sq mi)
- Time zone: UTC+1 (CET)
  - Summer (DST): UTC+2 (CEST)
- Website: www.ventasdehuelma.es

Ventas de Huelma is a municipality located in the comarca of Alhama, province of Granada, southern Spain. It had a population of 678 in 2017.

== See also ==
- List of municipalities in Granada
