= Alhama de Granada =

- Municipality
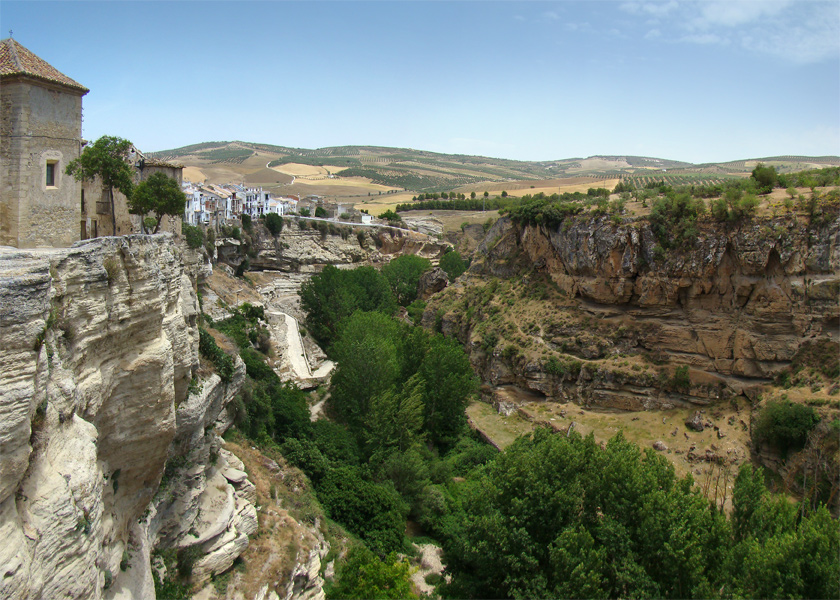
- View over the gorge of Río Alhama

- Flag Coat of arms

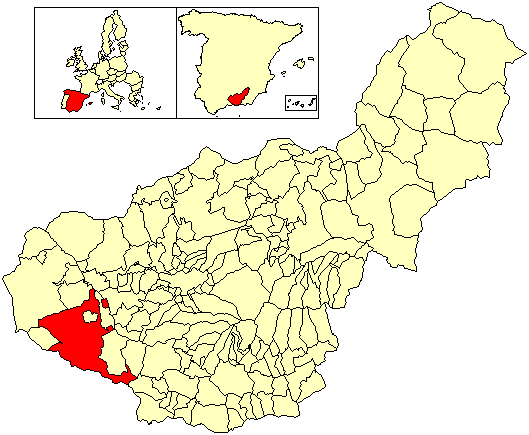

- Location in Spain Alhama de Granada (Andalusia) Alhama de Granada (Spain)
- Coordinates: 37°00′N 3°59′W
- Country: Spain
- Autonomous community: Andalusia
- Province: Granada
- Comarca: Alhama

Government
  - Alcalde: Jesús Ubiña Olmos (2015) (PP)

Area
  - Total: 433.50 km^{2} (167.38 sq mi)
- Elevation: 895 m (2,936 ft)

Population (2025-01-01)
  - Total: 5,544
  - Density: 12.79/km^{2} (33.12/sq mi)
- Demonyms: Alhameño, -ña; jameño, -ña
- Time zone: UTC+1 (CET)
  - Summer (DST): UTC+2 (CEST)
- Postal code: 18120
- Website: Official website

Alhama de Granada is a town in the province of Granada, approx. 50 km from the city of Granada. The name is derived from the thermal baths located there, which are called الـحَـمّـة al-hammah in Arabic.

== History ==
There is clear evidence that the Romans used the hot springs located near the town. In the 15th century, Arabs consolidated the town next to these hot springs and it was long believed that they built the thermal baths there, though Salvador Raya Retamero, a local historian, argues in his book Reseña histórica de los baños termales de la muy noble y leal ciudad de Alhama de Granada ("Brief history of the hot springs of the most noble and loyal city of Alhama de Granada") that the earliest baths are in fact Roman in origin. A short interview with the author explains the details. The bath house in the Almohade style of the 12th century that is preserved in the spa is a good example of Arab bath construction.

In 1482, the fortress town was taken from the Moorish Sultanate and Kingdom of Granada by the Catholic Monarchs. Alhama's position between Málaga and Granada gave it strategic importance for the Moors but they also had a particular fondness for the town and its thermal waters and hot springs. The cry of sorrow, ¡Ay de mi Alhama!, uttered by Abu Al-Hacen (Abu l-Hasan Ali, Sultan of Granada) following the battle of 1482 when the town was lost to the Catholic conquerors, entered the Spanish language as an exclamation of regret. The story of the fall of Alhama and the subsequent slaughter of its inhabitants by the Christian knights is referred to in Tariq Ali's, The Islam Quintet in the first book Shadows of the Pomegranate Tree. The strategic influence of Alhama de Granada made its fall vital for the conquest of the Kingdom of Granada, which led to the beginning of a flourishing Christian age, because of the patronage of the Catholic Monarchs.

Magnificent horse shoe arcs were built over the remains of Roman construction and are covered by a vaulted roof, pierced by star-shaped openings that let the daylight filter in. Under the vaulted roof of the baths the oldest warm spring of Alhama de Granada bubbles up. The newest one, which springs up a few metres from the other, was discovered in 1884, many centuries after a terrible earthquake whose epicentre could have been very near the area.

Eleno de Céspedes was born into slavery in the town in 1545 or 1546, and went on to become possibly the first female (if not intersex or transgender) surgeon in Spain, and perhaps in Europe.

Alhama de Granada was the community with the highest number of victims from the 1884 Andalusian earthquake. According to El Defensor de Granada there were 463 dead and 473 injured. The real number seems to have been considerably higher, since more bodies were found under the rubble. More than 70% of the houses collapsed and 15% were badly damaged. The oldest, lower and eastern part of the town suffered less than the newer part.

In 1975 the municipality of Alhama de Granada absorbed the municipality of Ventas de Zafarraya.

== Tourism ==
Alhama de Granada looks out over spectacular scenery; the view to the Sierra Nevada is uninterrupted. The Sierras of Tejeda, Almijara and Alhama Natural Park is a few kilometers to the south. Alhama is situated not far from Arenas del Rey (about 14 km away) which itself is situated on the edge of the vast Bermajales lake which is surrounded by woods of poplars and Mediterranean black pines. Constructed between 1947 and 1954 this reservoir with a hydro-electric plant at one end provides sandy beaches, safe swimming and plenty of non-motorised water sports. There are also a couple of cafes at the edge of the lake. Many people spend evenings and weekends barbecuing at the water's edge.

There are more than a few bars in Alhama which serve coffees and "tostadas" in the morning, lunch in the late afternoon, and tapas in the evening. At lunchtime a number of the bars serve a 'menu del día', a limited choice, but freshly prepared 3 course meal for a very reasonable price, often including a drink and bread. As is the tradition in the Granada region almost all of the bars serve a free tapas with every drink that is ordered. There is a programme of fiestas throughout the year: January 5 on the Three Kings there is a small parade through town where candies are thrown to the children, on 2 February the town still celebrates a fiesta which harks back to medieval times 'Candelaria' where a series of small fires are lit throughout the town and wine, with food is served to those that approach, welcoming travellers to the town. In February there is also an increasingly famous wine festival, plus two weekends of carnaval. At Easter (Semana Santa) there are processions and in the summer there is a full programme of cultural events, almost all of which are free to attend. There are two ferias one (in June) to mark the start of summer and the other in September to mark the end of summer. There are municipal sports facilities available to the public including an outdoor pool which is open in summer.

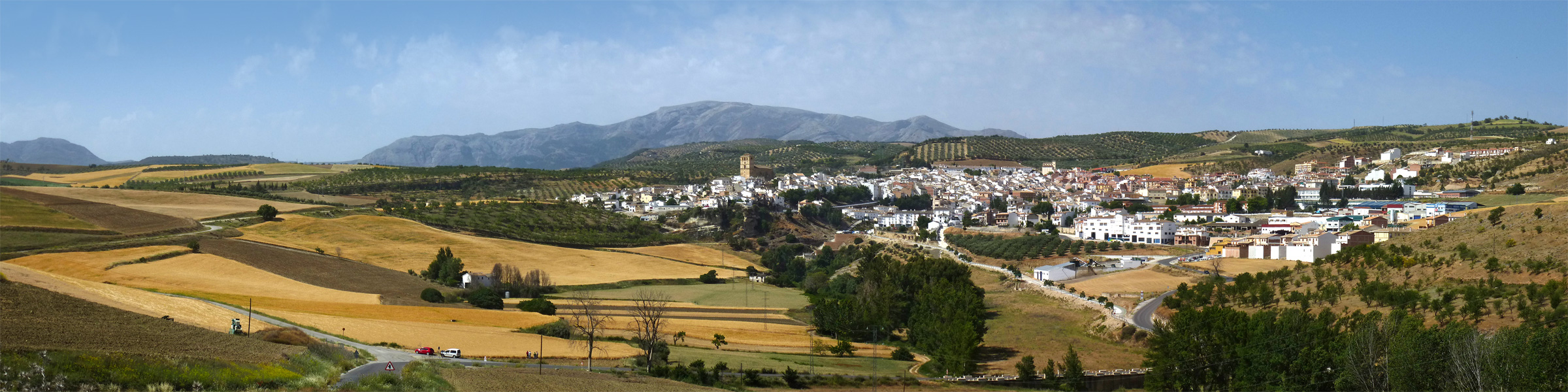
View of Alhama de Granada from the A402 approach

== Demography ==
From:INE Archiv

== See also ==
- List of municipalities in Granada
