= Torquato Taramelli =

Italian geologist

- Born: October 15, 1845; Bergamo, Lombardy
- Died: March 31, 1922 (aged 76); Pavia.
- Occupation: geologist
- Known for: Italian geological map, his studies in seismology

Torquato Taramelli (October 15, 1845 – March 31, 1922) was an Italian geologist.

== Biography ==
Taramelli was born in Bergamo, Lombardy.

After his graduation in Natural Sciences, in Milan, he became assistant of Antonio Stoppani at the Politecnico di Milano. Here he studied the territory of the Italian region Friuli, where he founded the local alpine association in 1874. He became then professor, at the University of Genova and later, in Geology, Mineralogy and Paleontology, at the University of Pavia, in 1875. Here he became rector in 1888 till 1891. He founded the Italian Geological Institute and was one of the founders of the Italian Seismological Society. He was also member of the Royal Commission for Geodynamics and, since 1887 participated to the direction of the Central Office of Meteorology and Geodynamics, where he organized a net of geodynamical observatories.

He died in Pavia.

== Studies ==
Among the most important works is his Italian geological map and his studies in seismology, in particular to analyze the macroseismical fields of some important seismological events. Since the end of the 19th century he played a role in many important projects of civil engineer and agricultural development. He was member of a group of scientists that founded in Italy the "new geology", bringing Italian geology to European standards.
