= Cacín =

Cacín, Spain
- Flag Coat of arms

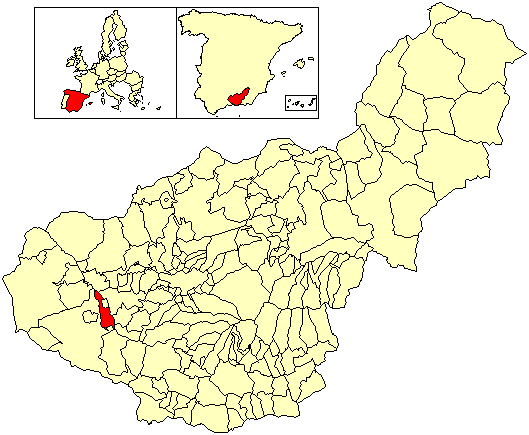
- Location of Cacín
- Coordinates: 37°03′N 3°55′W
- Country: Spain
- Province: Granada
- Municipality: Cacín

Area
  - Total: 39 km^{2} (15 sq mi)
- Elevation: 693 m (2,274 ft)

Population (2025-01-01)
  - Total: 549
  - Density: 14/km^{2} (36/sq mi)
- Time zone: UTC+1 (CET)
  - Summer (DST): UTC+2 (CEST)

Cacín is a city located in the province of Granada, Spain. It lies to the east of the Río Cacín, from which it takes its name. According to the 2005 census (INE), the city has a population of 697 inhabitants.

== See also ==
- List of municipalities in Granada
