= Cumbres del Guadalfeo =

Cumbres del Guadalfeo VdlT
- Wine region
- Cumbres del Guadalfeo VdlT in the province of Granada in the region of Andalusia
- Type: Vino de la Tierra
- Country: Spain

Cumbres del Guadalfeo in Andalucía.

Cumbres del Guadalfeo (previously called Contraviesa-Alpujarra) is a Spanish geographical indication for Vino de la Tierra wines located in the Alpujarras mountains, in the autonomous region of Andalusia. Vino de la Tierra is one step below the mainstream Denominación de Origen indication on the Spanish wine quality ladder.

The area covered by this geographical indication comprises the following municipalities: Albondón, Albuñol, Almegíjar, Cádiar, Cástaras, Lobras, Murtas, Polopos, Rubite, Sorvilán, Torvizcón, Turón, and Ugíjar, in the province of Granada (Andalusia, Spain).

It acquired its Vino de la Tierra status in 2004.

== Grape varieties ==
- Red: Garnacha tinta, Cabernet Franc, Pinot noir, Syrah, Cabernet Sauvignon, Tempranillo and Merlot
- White: Jaén blanco, Montúa, Perruno, Vijiriego, Pedro Ximénez, Chardonnay and Moscatel
