= Canar =

Cañar or Cáñar may refer to:

- Cañar Province, Ecuador
  - Cañar Canton
  - Cañar, Ecuador
- Cáñar, a village in Granada, Spain
- Canar (service provider), a planned LTE network in Sudan
