= Jete =

Jete or Jeté may refer to:

- Jete, Granada, a municipality of Spain
- Jeté (dance), a leap in ballet
  - Grand jeté
- Temelín Nuclear Power Station (Jaderná elektrárna Temelín), Czech Republic
- Kornbread Jeté, American drag queen
- Jeté, a playing technique on bowed instruments, also known as ricochet; see violin technique

== See also ==
- La Jetée
