= Nívar =

Coordinates: 37°16′N 3°35′W

- city
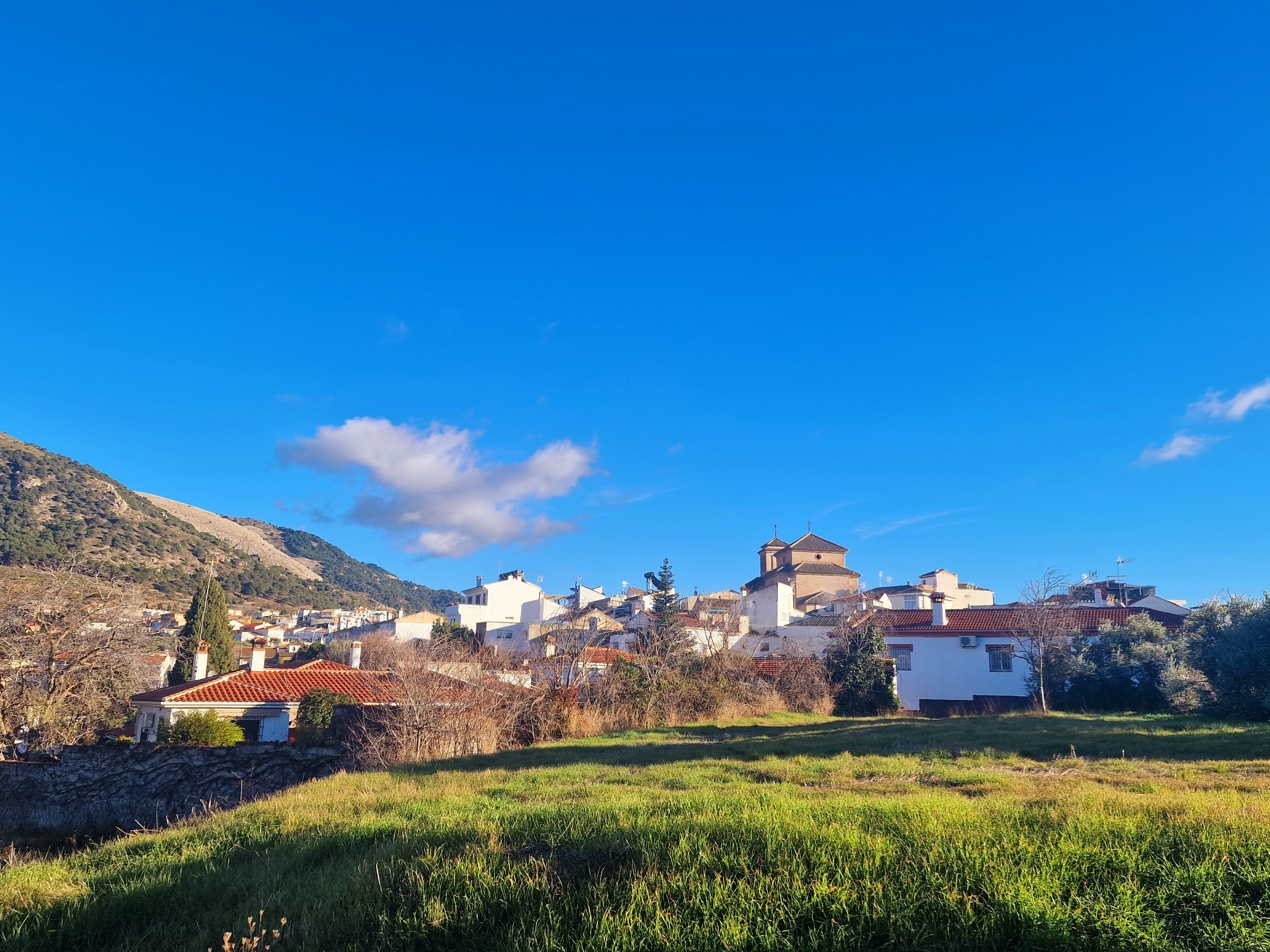

- Flag Coat of arms

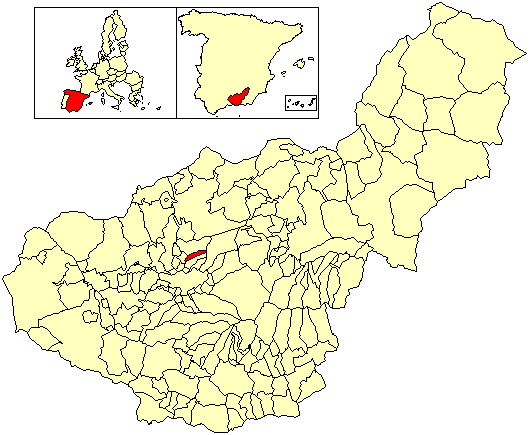
- Location of Nívar
- Country: Spain
- Province: Granada
- Municipality: Nívar

Area
  - Total: 11 km^{2} (4.2 sq mi)
- Elevation: 1 m (3.3 ft)

Population (2025-01-01)
  - Total: 1,093
  - Density: 99/km^{2} (260/sq mi)
- Time zone: UTC+1 (CET)
  - Summer (DST): UTC+2 (CEST)

Nívar is a municipality located in the province of Granada, Spain, situated in the autonomous community of Andalusia. It is located in the centre-part of the county known as Vega de Granada, which its situated in the northeast skirt of Sierra de la Alfaguara. It is just 14 km away from the capital of the province. At the same time, it is confined by the municipalities of Cogollos Vega, Huétor Santillán, Alfacar and Güevéjar. According to the 2005 census (INE), the municipality has a population of 681 inhabitants.

== Festivities ==
There are two major festivals in the municipality. The first occurs in the second weekend of September and honours the local saint, Santo Cristo de la Salud. The celebrations include leisure and cultural activities, sports tournaments (notably a football match between single and married), a costume contest, and a community feast.

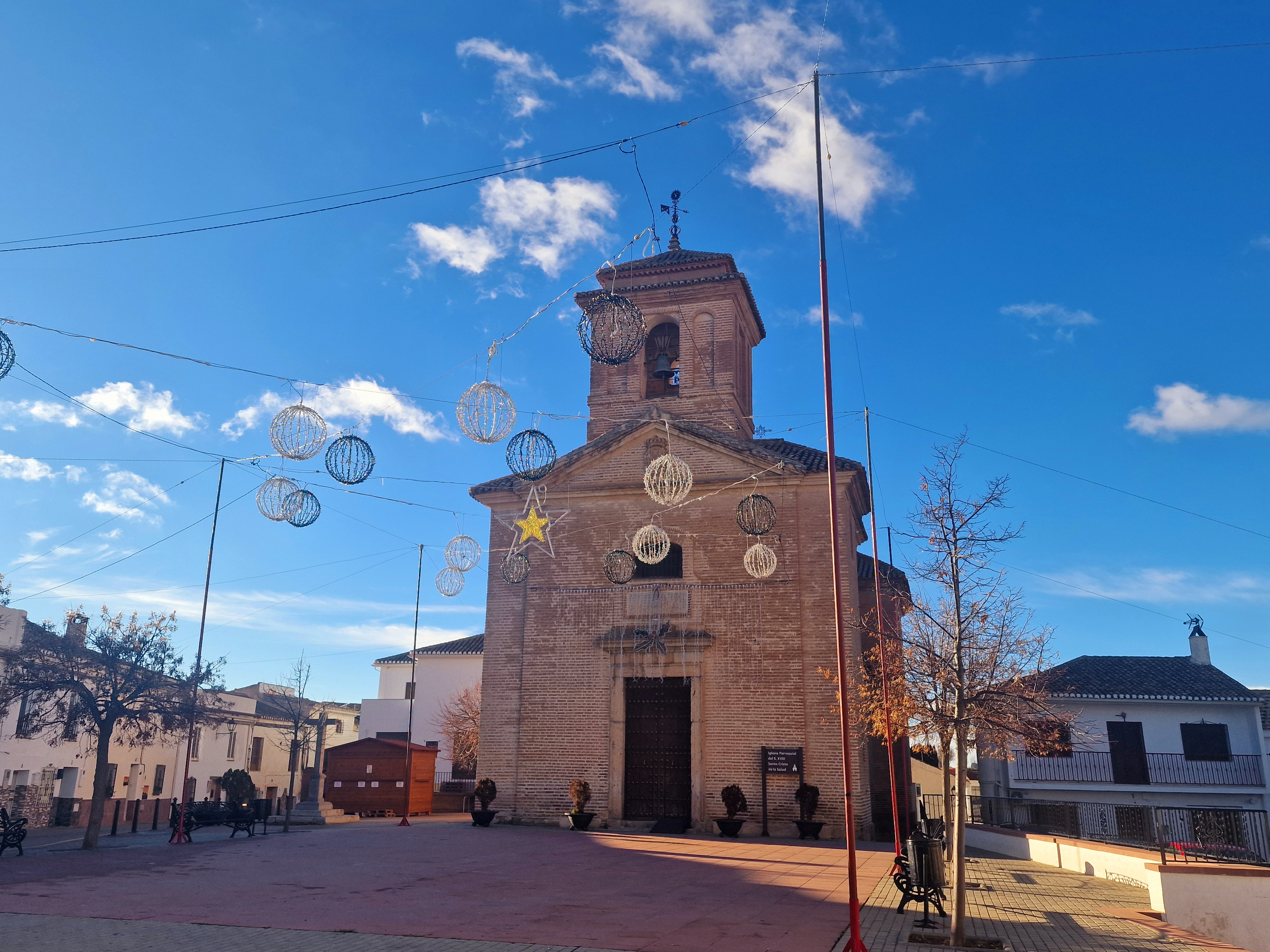
Church of Santo Cristo de la Salud, Nívar

On the third of May is the local festival, the Day of the Cross. The citizens of the town create a romeria to the cross of Sierra de la Yedra, accompanied by dance and music and concluded with a meal. The Eucharist is celebrated near the iron cross that crowns the mountain range.

== See also ==
- List of municipalities in Granada
