= List of municipalities in Granada =

Map of Spain with the province of Granada highlighted

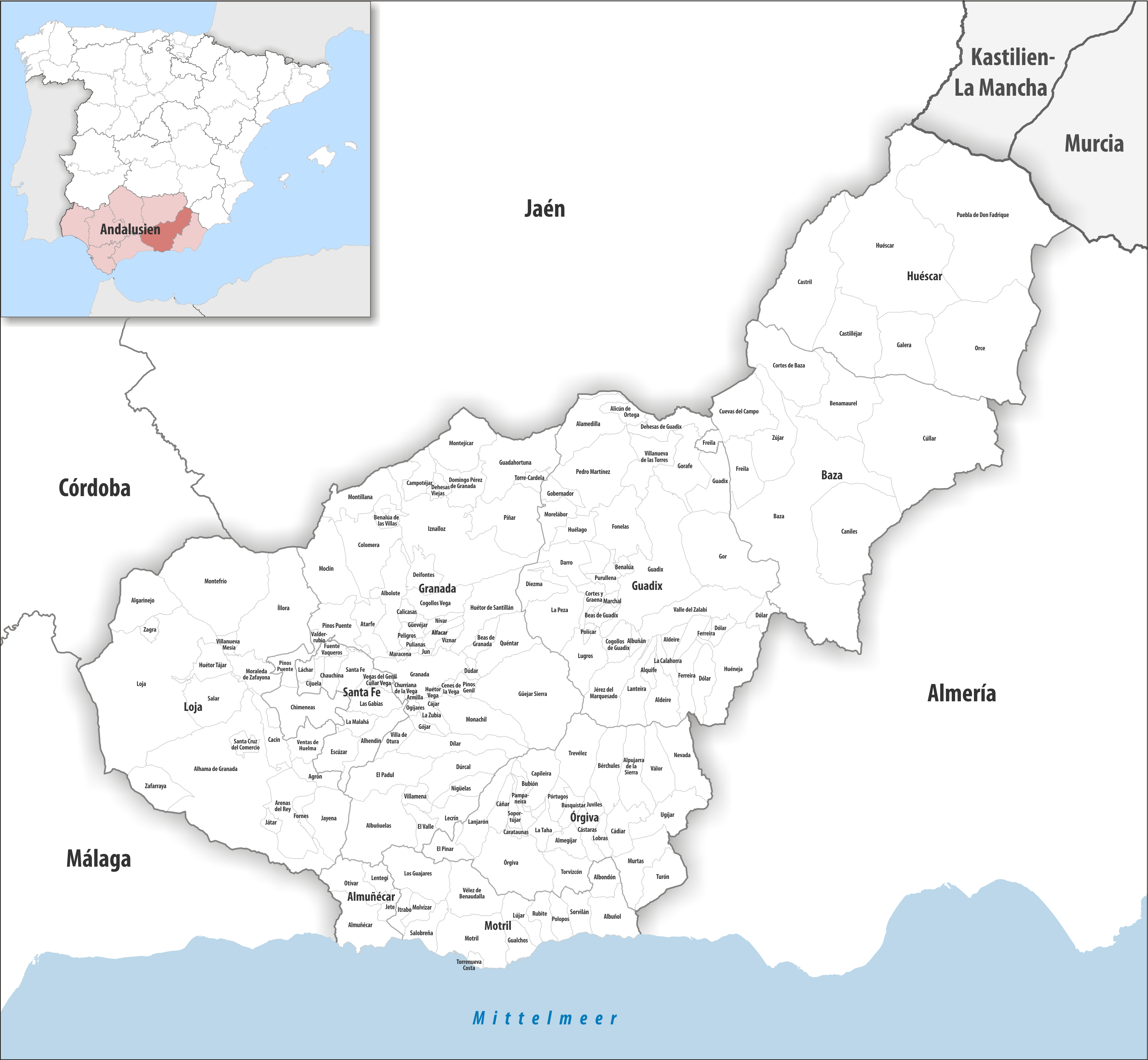
Map of the municipalities in the province of Granada

Granada is a province in the autonomous community of Andalusia, Spain. The province is divided into 174 municipalities. As of the 2024 Spanish census, Granada is the 17th most populous of Spain's 50 provinces, with 939,741 inhabitants, and the 15th largest by land area, spanning 12,645.41 square kilometres (4,882.42 sq mi). Municipalities are the most basic local political division in Spain and can only belong to one province. They enjoy a large degree of autonomy in their local administration, being in charge of tasks such as urban planning, water supply, lighting, roads, local police, and firefighting.

The organisation of municipalities in Spain is outlined by the local government law Ley 7/1985, de 2 de abril, Reguladora de las Bases del Régimen Local (transl. Law 7/1985, of 2 April, Regulating the Bases of the Local Administration), which was passed by the Cortes Generales—Spain’s national parliament—on 2 April 1985 and finalised by royal decree on 18 April 1986. Municipalities in Granada are also governed by the Statute of Autonomy of Andalusia, which includes provisions concerning their relations with Andalusia's autonomous government. All citizens of Spain are required to register in the municipality in which they reside. Each municipality is a corporation (Note: Within the context of local government in Spain, a corporation is a legal entity representing a municipality. Each municipality is empowered to govern over a specific piece of land and its population.) with independent legal personhood: its governing body is called the ayuntamiento (municipal council or corporation), a term often also used to refer to the municipal offices (city and town halls). The ayuntamiento is composed of the mayor (Spanish: alcalde), the deputy mayors (tenientes de alcalde) and the councillors (concejales), who form the plenary (pleno), the deliberative body. Municipalities are categorised by population for determining the number of councillors: three when the population is up to 100 inhabitants, five for 101–250, seven for 251–1,000, nine for 1,001–2,000, eleven for 2,001–5,000, thirteen for 5,001–10,000, seventeen for 10,001–20,000, twenty-one for 20,001–50,000, and twenty-five for 50,001–100,000. One councillor is added for every additional 100,000 inhabitants, with a further one included if the total would otherwise be even, to avoid tied votes.

The mayor and the deputy mayors are elected by the plenary assembly, which is itself elected by universal suffrage. Elections in municipalities with more than 250 inhabitants are carried out following a proportional representation system with closed lists, whilst those with a population lower than 250 use a block plurality voting system with open lists. The plenary assembly must meet periodically, with meetings occurring more or less frequently depending on the population of the municipality: monthly for those whose population is larger than 20,000, once every two months if it ranges between 5,001 and 20,000, and once every three months if it does not exceed 5,000. Many ayuntamientos also have a local governing board (Spanish: junta de gobierno local), which is appointed by the mayor from amongst the councillors and is required for municipalities of over 5,000 inhabitants. The board, whose role is to assist the mayor between meetings of the plenary assembly, may not include more than one third of the councillors.

The largest municipality by population in the province as of the 2024 Spanish census is Granada, its capital, with 233,532 residents, while the smallest is Lobras, with 136 residents. The largest municipality by area is Baza, which spans 545.39 square kilometres (210.58 sq mi), while Cájar is the smallest at 1.65 square kilometres (0.64 sq mi).

== Municipalities ==
Largest municipalities in the province of Granada by population

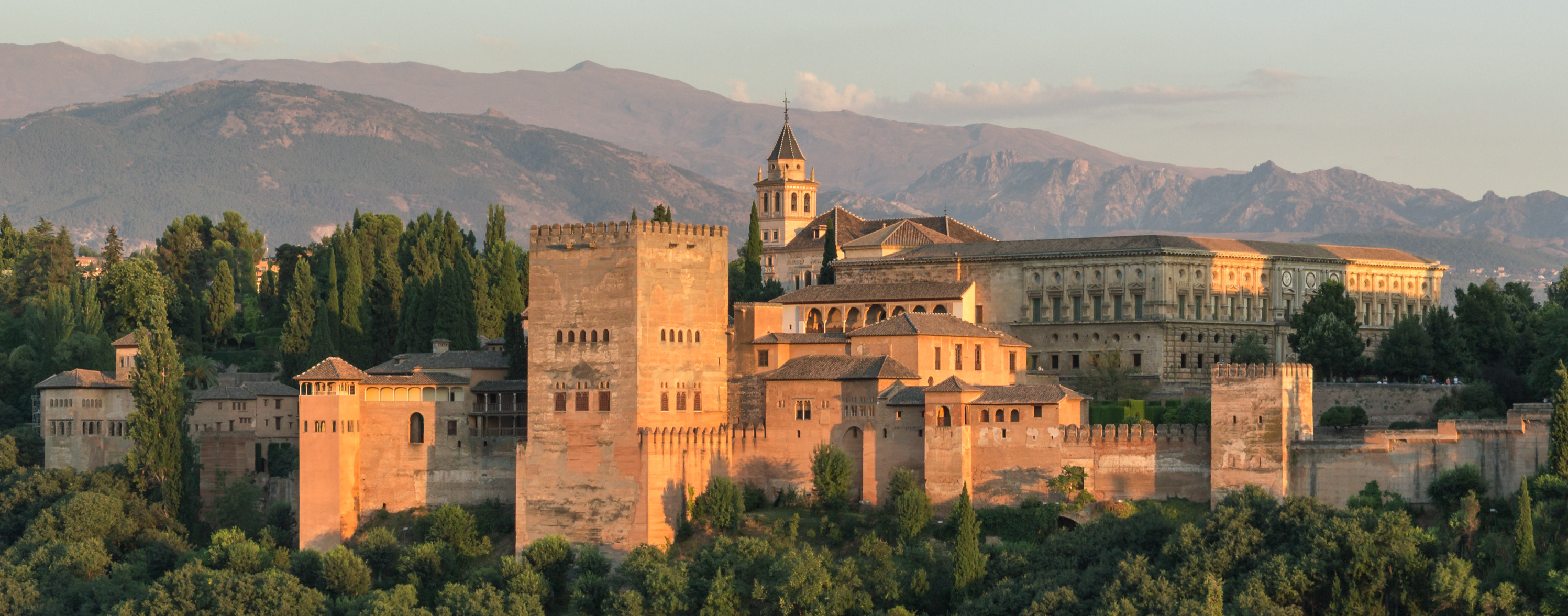
Granada is the province's capital and largest municipality by population.

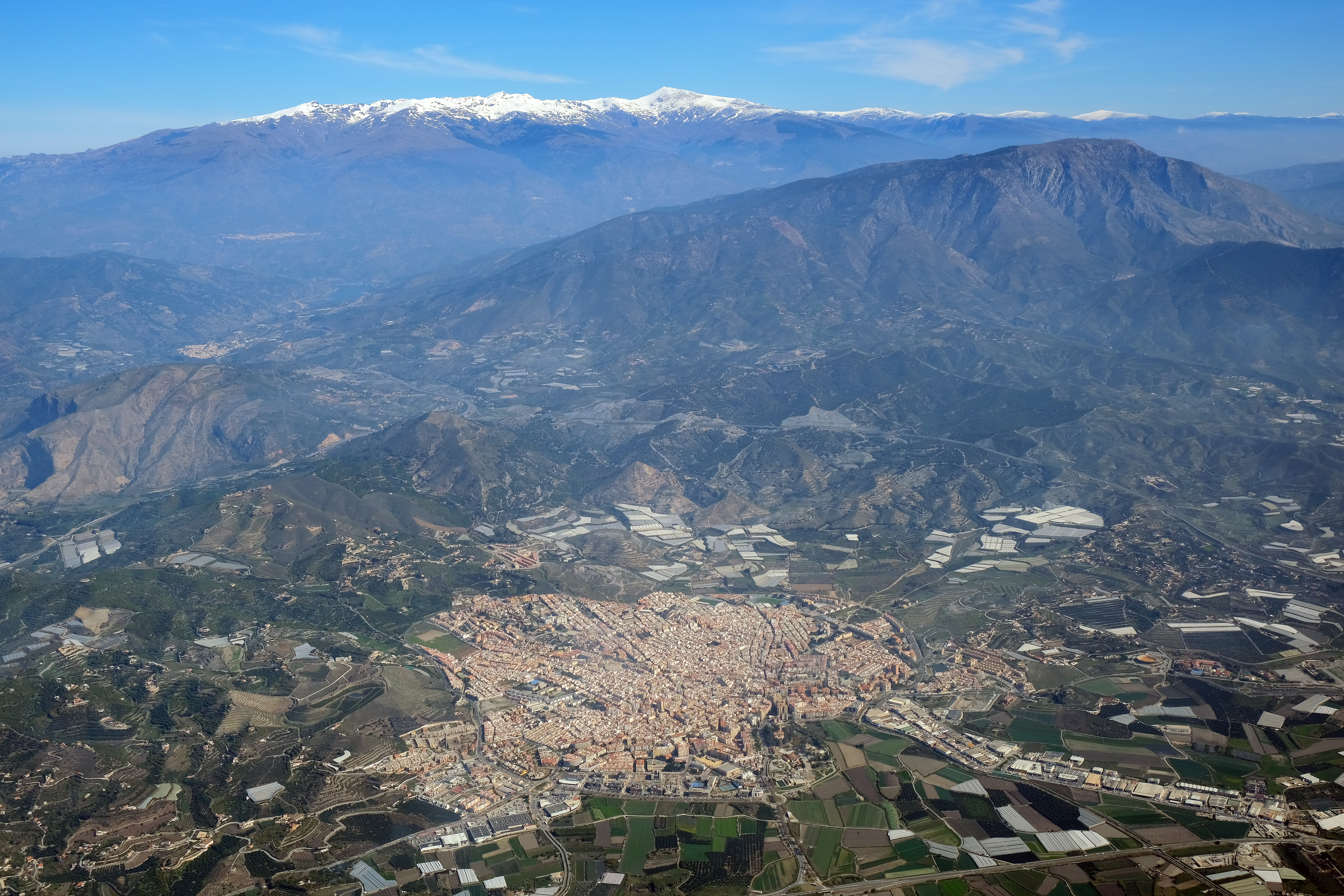
Motril, the second largest municipality by population in the province of Granada

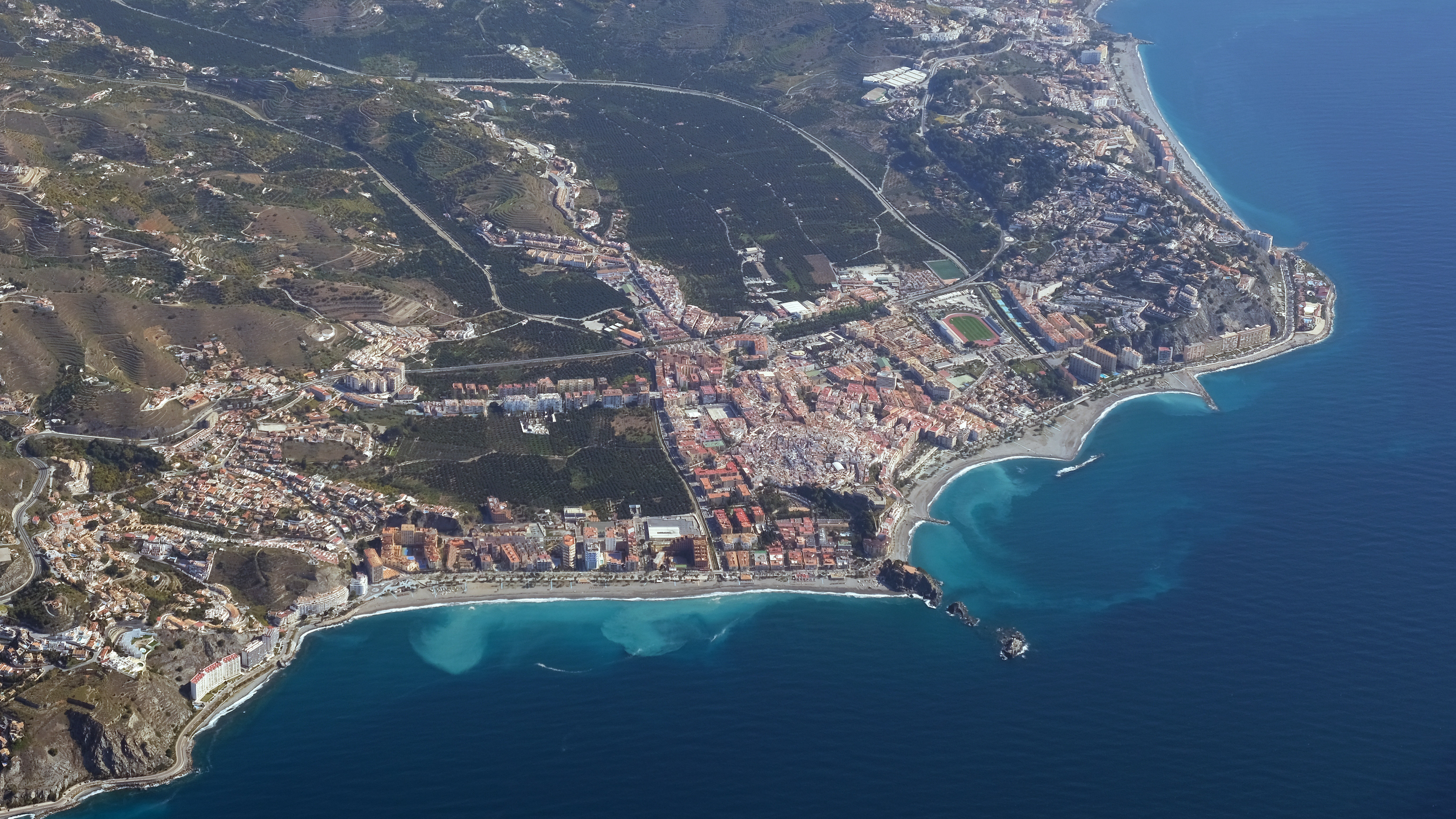
Almuñécar is the province of Granada's third largest municipality by population.

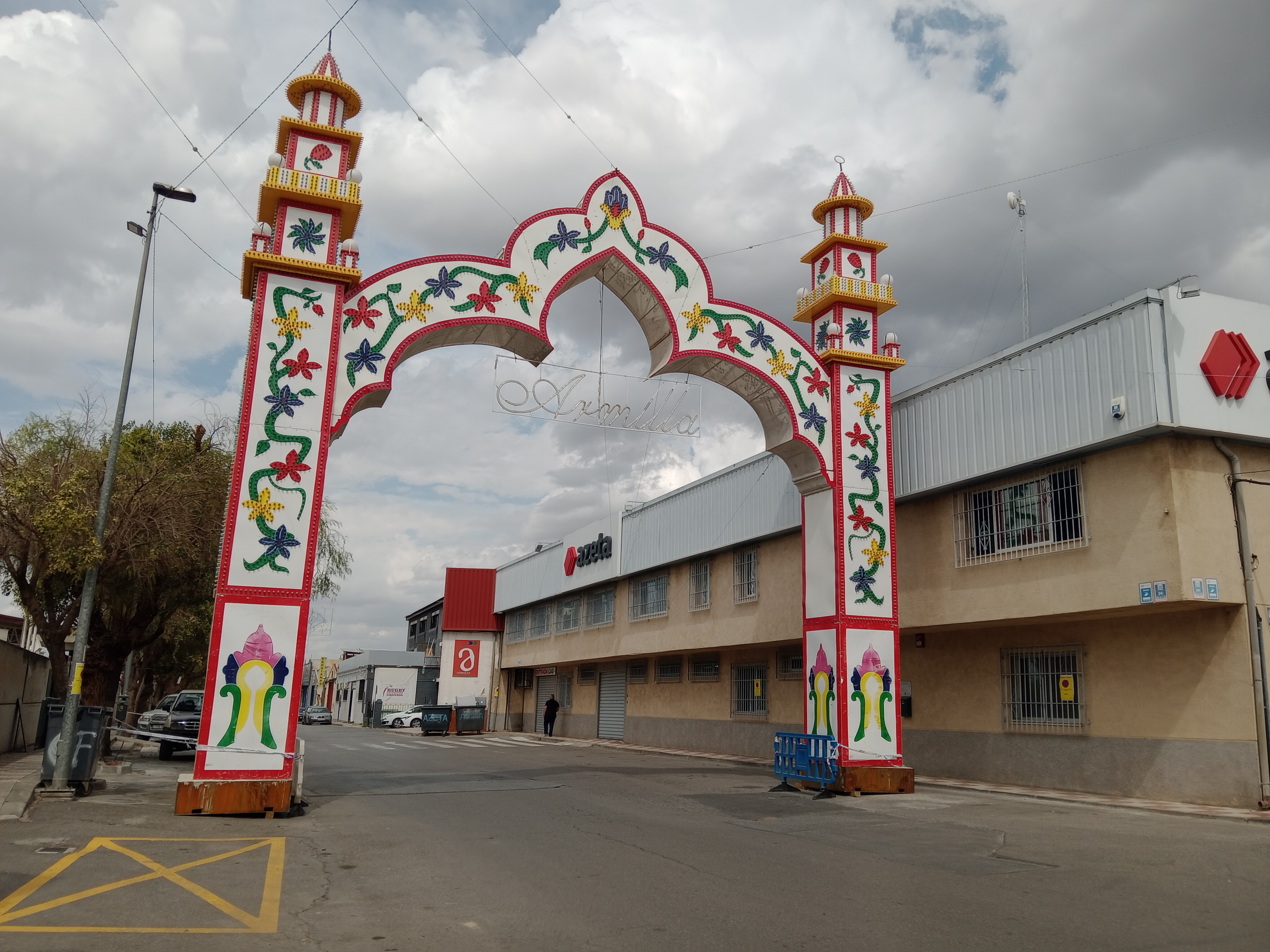
Armilla, the province of Granada's fourth largest municipality by population

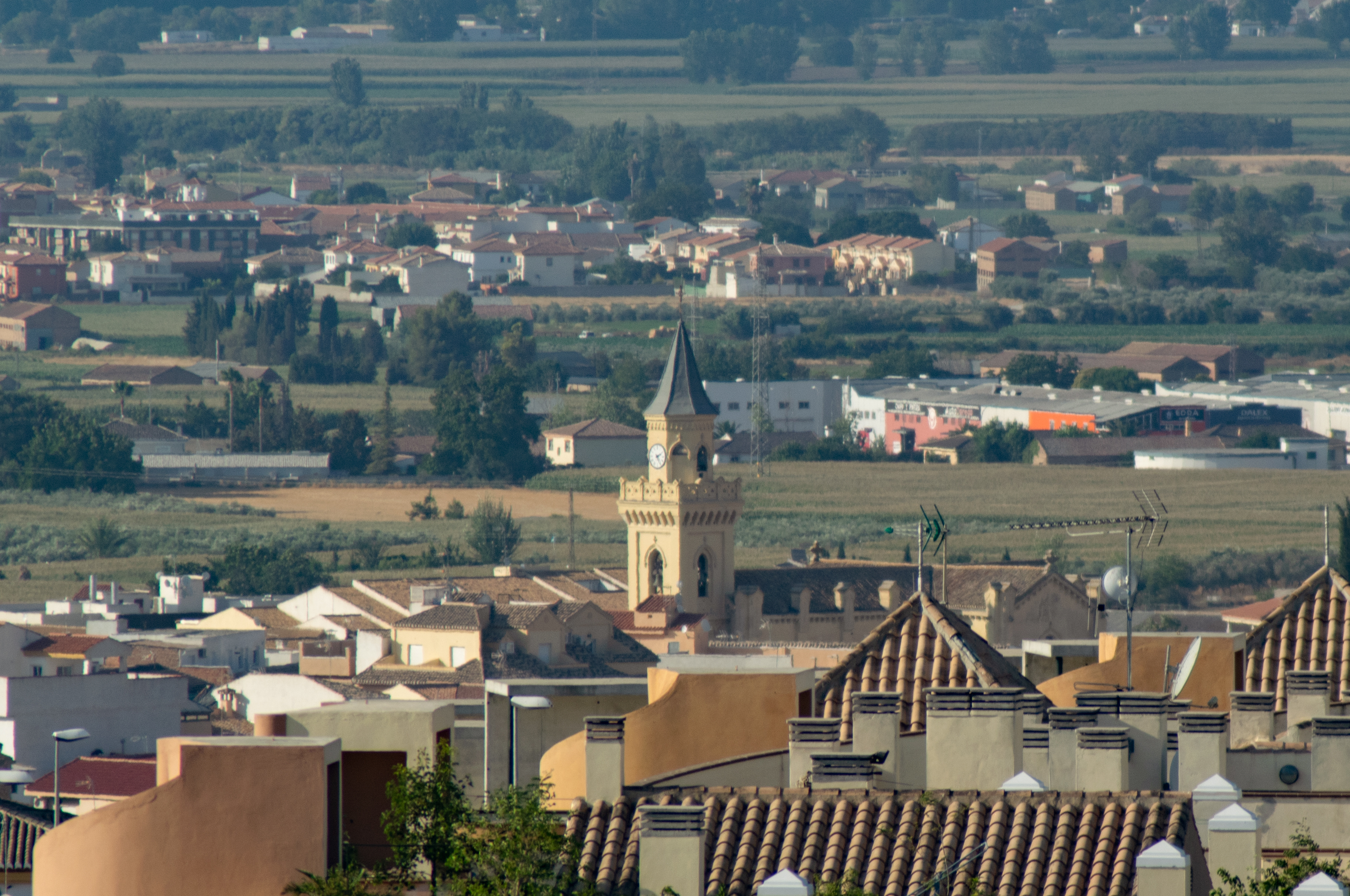
Las Gabias, the fifth largest municipality by population in the province of Granada

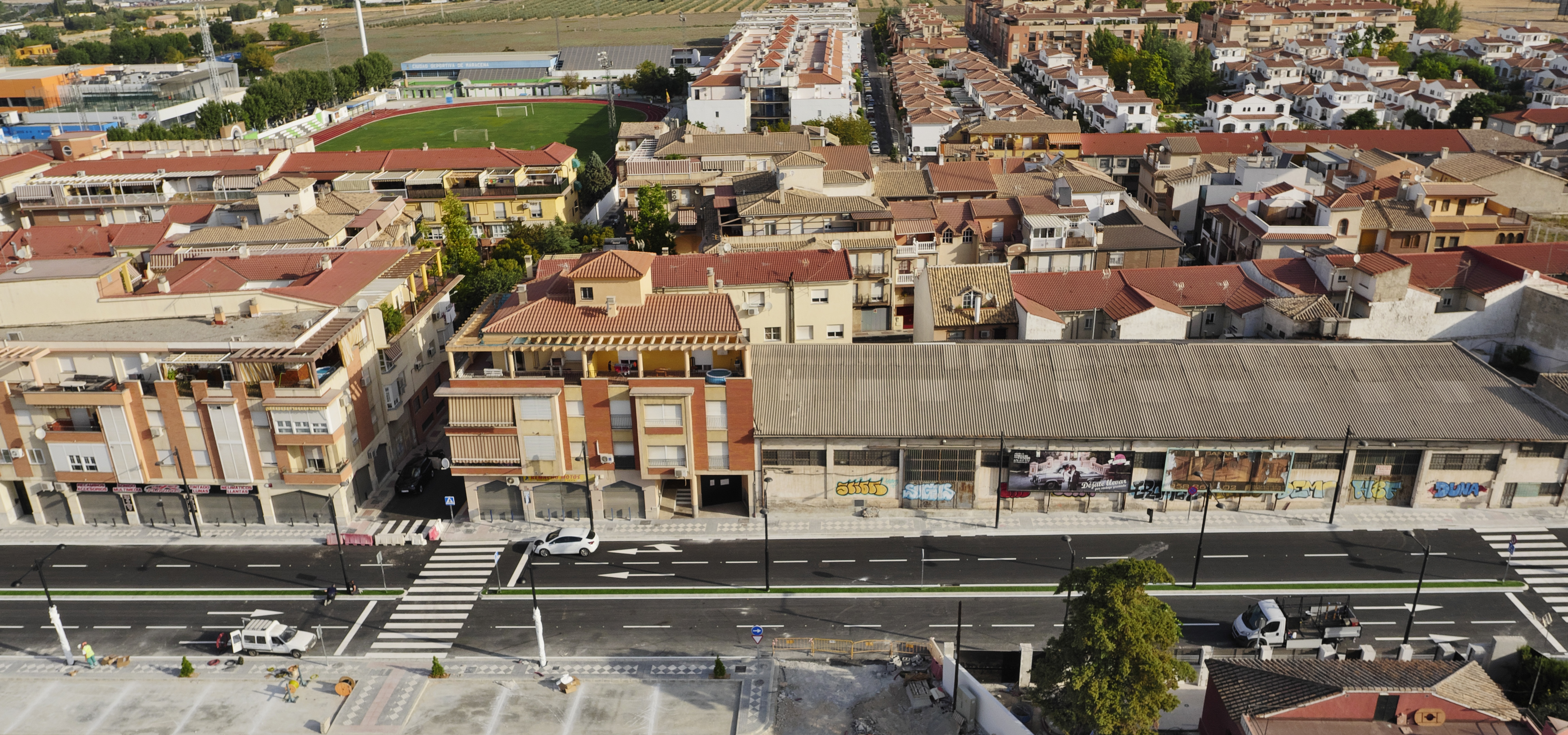
Maracena is the province of Granada's sixth largest municipality by population.

† Provincial capital

Municipalities in the province of Granada
Name	Population (2024 census)	Population (2011 census)	Population change	Land area (km²)	Population density (2024)
Agrón	244	338	−27.8%	27.00	9.0/km^{2}
Alamedilla	546	693	−21.2%	90.71	6.0/km^{2}
Albolote	19,554	18,066	+8.2%	78.58	248.8/km^{2}
Albondón	731	911	−19.8%	34.48	21.2/km^{2}
Albuñán	424	431	−1.6%	8.53	49.7/km^{2}
Albuñol	7,405	6,610	+12.0%	62.94	117.7/km^{2}
Albuñuelas	794	949	−16.3%	140.05	5.7/km^{2}
Aldeire	591	666	−11.3%	70.07	8.4/km^{2}
Alfacar	5,813	5,521	+5.3%	16.73	347.5/km^{2}
Algarinejo	2,331	3,060	−23.8%	92.11	25.3/km^{2}
Alhama de Granada	5,649	6,225	−9.3%	419.60	13.5/km^{2}
Alhendín	10,424	7,580	+37.5%	50.56	206.2/km^{2}
Alicún de Ortega	456	509	−10.4%	22.83	20.0/km^{2}
Almegíjar	328	414	−20.8%	29.42	11.1/km^{2}
Almuñécar	27,699	26,969	+2.7%	83.36	332.3/km^{2}
Alpujarra de la Sierra	962	1,140	−15.6%	68.53	14.0/km^{2}
Alquife	545	729	−25.2%	12.19	44.7/km^{2}
Arenas del Rey	615	2,012	−69.4%	92.81	6.6/km^{2}
Armilla	25,350	22,593	+12.2%	4.31	5,881.7/km^{2}
Atarfe	20,492	16,790	+22.0%	47.25	433.7/km^{2}
Baza	20,575	21,276	−3.3%	545.39	37.7/km^{2}
Beas de Granada	1,010	1,034	−2.3%	23.20	43.5/km^{2}
Beas de Guadix	316	382	−17.3%	16.24	19.5/km^{2}
Benalúa	3,344	3,348	−0.1%	8.66	386.1/km^{2}
Benalúa de las Villas	1,024	1,353	−24.3%	21.65	47.3/km^{2}
Benamaurel	2,247	2,422	−7.2%	127.88	17.6/km^{2}
Bérchules	698	811	−13.9%	69.59	10.0/km^{2}
Bubión	315	345	−8.7%	14.86	21.2/km^{2}
Busquístar	313	328	−4.6%	18.03	17.4/km^{2}
Cacín	535	605	−11.6%	39.61	13.5/km^{2}
Cádiar	1,534	1,618	−5.2%	47.32	32.4/km^{2}
Cájar	5,488	4,781	+14.8%	1.65	3,326.1/km^{2}
La Calahorra	678	764	−11.3%	39.45	17.2/km^{2}
Calicasas	665	596	+11.6%	11.25	59.1/km^{2}
Campotéjar	1,250	1,357	−7.9%	35.82	34.9/km^{2}
Caniles	3,928	4,691	−16.3%	216.85	18.1/km^{2}
Cáñar	401	424	−5.4%	26.35	15.2/km^{2}
Capileira	578	554	+4.3%	56.90	10.2/km^{2}
Carataunas	227	183	+24.0%	4.66	48.7/km^{2}
Cástaras	215	277	−22.4%	28.36	7.6/km^{2}
Castilléjar	1,300	1,496	−13.1%	131.32	9.9/km^{2}
Castril	1,969	2,387	−17.5%	243.26	8.1/km^{2}
Cenes de la Vega	8,343	7,844	+6.4%	6.49	1,285.5/km^{2}
Chauchina	5,798	5,143	+12.7%	21.21	273.4/km^{2}
Chimeneas	1,241	1,445	−14.1%	90.33	13.7/km^{2}
Churriana de la Vega	16,706	13,091	+27.6%	6.57	2,542.8/km^{2}
Cijuela	3,729	3,106	+20.1%	17.92	208.1/km^{2}
Cogollos de Guadix	635	730	−13.0%	30.26	21.0/km^{2}
Cogollos Vega	2,097	2,027	+3.5%	49.87	42.0/km^{2}
Colomera	1,284	1,484	−13.5%	111.98	11.5/km^{2}
Cortes de Baza	1,795	2,206	−18.6%	140.56	12.8/km^{2}
Cortes y Graena	967	1,053	−8.2%	22.40	43.2/km^{2}
Cuevas del Campo	1,802	1,970	−8.5%	96.61	18.7/km^{2}
Cúllar	3,937	4,556	−13.6%	427.53	9.2/km^{2}
Cúllar Vega	7,818	7,068	+10.6%	4.27	1,830.9/km^{2}
Darro	1,700	1,505	+13.0%	50.35	33.8/km^{2}
Dehesas de Guadix	383	486	−21.2%	56.95	6.7/km^{2}
Dehesas Viejas	641	No data (Note: Dehesas Viejas was partitioned from Iznalloz and became an independent municipality in 2014 and is thus not included in the 2011 census.)		13.80	46.4/km^{2}
Deifontes	2,620	2,581	+1.5%	40.48	64.7/km^{2}
Diezma	819	811	+1.0%	42.09	19.5/km^{2}
Dílar	2,322	1,818	+27.7%	79.28	29.3/km^{2}
Dólar	606	620	−2.3%	78.59	7.7/km^{2}
Domingo Pérez de Granada	835	No data (Note: Domingo Pérez de Granada was partitioned from Iznalloz and became an independent municipality in 2015 and is thus not included in the 2011 census.)		48.68	17.2/km^{2}
Dúdar	376	327	+15.0%	8.37	44.9/km^{2}
Dúrcal	7,218	7,272	−0.7%	76.63	94.2/km^{2}
Escúzar	843	806	+4.6%	46.39	18.2/km^{2}
Ferreira	303	351	−13.7%	43.58	7.0/km^{2}
Fonelas	964	1,102	−12.5%	96.44	10.0/km^{2}
Fornes	532	No data (Note: Fornes was partitioned from Arenas del Rey and became an independent municipality in 2018 and is thus not included in the 2011 census.)		15.15	35.1/km^{2}
Freila	947	1,044	−9.3%	74.51	12.7/km^{2}
Fuente Vaqueros	4,633	4,481	+3.4%	16.07	288.3/km^{2}
Las Gabias	23,492	18,282	+28.5%	39.06	601.4/km^{2}
Galera	1,107	1,191	−7.1%	118.29	9.4/km^{2}
Gobernador	239	324	−26.2%	23.01	10.4/km^{2}
Gójar	6,334	5,248	+20.7%	11.97	529.2/km^{2}
Gor	763	886	−13.9%	181.03	4.2/km^{2}
Gorafe	372	470	−20.9%	77.05	4.8/km^{2}
Granada†	233,532	241,003	−3.1%	88.11	2,650.5/km^{2}
Guadahortuna	1,846	2,039	−9.5%	121.24	15.2/km^{2}
Guadix	18,729	18,816	−0.5%	324.20	57.8/km^{2}
Los Guájares	1,136	1,152	−1.4%	89.32	12.7/km^{2}
Gualchos	5,297	4,530	+16.9%	31.03	170.7/km^{2}
Güéjar Sierra	2,944	2,978	−1.1%	238.95	12.3/km^{2}
Güevéjar	2,693	2,547	+5.7%	9.75	276.2/km^{2}
Huélago	371	353	+5.1%	32.62	11.4/km^{2}
Huéneja	1,189	1,233	−3.6%	116.74	10.2/km^{2}
Huéscar	7,232	7,974	−9.3%	472.86	15.3/km^{2}
Huétor Santillán	1,944	1,855	+4.8%	93.27	20.8/km^{2}
Huétor Tájar	10,670	10,113	+5.5%	39.94	267.2/km^{2}
Huétor Vega	12,279	11,844	+3.7%	4.24	2,896.0/km^{2}
Íllora	9,908	10,594	−6.5%	197.44	50.2/km^{2}
Ítrabo	994	1,061	−6.3%	19.01	52.3/km^{2}
Iznalloz	5,172	6,970	−25.8%	247.63	20.9/km^{2}
Játar	616	No data (Note: Játar was partitioned from Arenas del Rey and became an independent municipality in 2015 and is thus not included in the 2011 census.)		9.87	62.4/km^{2}
Jayena	996	1,174	−15.2%	79.52	12.5/km^{2}
Jérez del Marquesado	982	1,052	−6.7%	82.75	11.9/km^{2}
Jete	996	876	+13.7%	13.91	71.6/km^{2}
Jun	4,174	3,548	+17.6%	3.69	1,131.2/km^{2}
Juviles	148	158	−6.3%	14.99	9.9/km^{2}
Láchar	3,805	3,188	+19.4%	13.12	290.0/km^{2}
Lanjarón	3,678	3,794	−3.1%	60.38	60.9/km^{2}
Lanteira	544	597	−8.9%	52.78	10.3/km^{2}
Lecrín	2,274	2,248	+1.2%	40.49	56.2/km^{2}
Lentegí	353	338	+4.4%	23.76	14.9/km^{2}
Lobras	136	152	−10.5%	16.05	8.5/km^{2}
Loja	20,814	21,431	−2.9%	447.49	46.5/km^{2}
Lugros	311	343	−9.3%	63.28	4.9/km^{2}
Lújar	493	475	+3.8%	36.88	13.4/km^{2}
La Malahá	1,881	1,845	+2.0%	25.42	74.0/km^{2}
Maracena	22,370	21,560	+3.8%	4.89	4,574.6/km^{2}
Marchal	430	439	−2.1%	7.81	55.1/km^{2}
Moclín	3,538	4,153	−14.8%	113.11	31.3/km^{2}
Molvízar	2,768	3,174	−12.8%	21.47	128.9/km^{2}
Monachil	8,591	7,407	+16.0%	88.92	96.6/km^{2}
Montefrío	5,282	6,016	−12.2%	253.91	20.8/km^{2}
Montejícar	2,030	2,383	−14.8%	87.57	23.2/km^{2}
Montillana	1,058	1,361	−22.3%	75.17	14.1/km^{2}
Moraleda de Zafayona	3,140	3,248	−3.3%	48.16	65.2/km^{2}
Morelábor	588	742	−20.8%	38.55	15.3/km^{2}
Motril	59,867	60,460	−1.0%	103.31	579.5/km^{2}
Murtas	442	614	−28.0%	71.70	6.2/km^{2}
Nevada	1,099	1,165	−5.7%	77.31	14.2/km^{2}
Nigüelas	1,234	1,182	+4.4%	30.93	39.9/km^{2}
Nívar	1,069	969	+10.3%	11.18	95.6/km^{2}
Ogíjares	15,047	13,415	+12.2%	6.95	2,165.0/km^{2}
Orce	1,146	1,285	−10.8%	324.66	3.5/km^{2}
Órgiva	5,747	5,523	+4.1%	134.14	42.8/km^{2}
Otívar	1,049	1,193	−12.1%	57.47	18.3/km^{2}
Padul	9,536	8,471	+12.6%	89.15	107.0/km^{2}
Pampaneira	316	358	−11.7%	17.47	18.1/km^{2}
Pedro Martínez	1,146	1,228	−6.7%	136.90	8.4/km^{2}
Peligros	11,661	11,137	+4.7%	10.14	1,150.0/km^{2}
La Peza	1,114	1,291	−13.7%	101.29	11.0/km^{2}
El Pinar	873	1,011	−13.6%	38.01	23.0/km^{2}
Pinos Genil	1,643	1,385	+18.6%	13.99	117.4/km^{2}
Pinos Puente	9,722	13,112	−25.9%	92.94	104.6/km^{2}
Píñar	1,076	1,268	−15.1%	125.84	8.6/km^{2}
Polícar	266	229	+16.2%	5.38	49.4/km^{2}
Polopos	1,671	1,789	−6.6%	26.50	63.1/km^{2}
Pórtugos	388	385	+0.8%	20.83	18.6/km^{2}
Puebla de Don Fadrique	2,203	2,375	−7.2%	522.69	4.2/km^{2}
Pulianas	5,653	5,184	+9.0%	6.33	893.0/km^{2}
Purullena	2,358	2,314	+1.9%	21.46	109.9/km^{2}
Quéntar	949	1,014	−6.4%	66.49	14.3/km^{2}
Rubite	434	430	+0.9%	28.55	15.2/km^{2}
Salar	2,602	2,780	−6.4%	84.35	30.8/km^{2}
Salobreña	12,608	12,582	+0.2%	34.91	361.2/km^{2}
Santa Cruz del Comercio	512	580	−11.7%	16.89	30.3/km^{2}
Santa Fe	15,301	15,280	+0.1%	38.30	399.5/km^{2}
Soportújar	283	278	+1.8%	14.16	20.0/km^{2}
Sorvilán	510	557	−8.4%	34.33	14.9/km^{2}
La Taha	789	757	+4.2%	25.59	30.8/km^{2}
Torre-Cardela	714	942	−24.2%	15.19	47.0/km^{2}
Torrenueva Costa	3,121	No data (Note: Torrenueva Costa was partitioned from Motril and became an independent municipality in 2018 and is thus not included in the 2011 census.)		6.47	482.4/km^{2}
Torvizcón	620	733	−15.4%	51.43	12.1/km^{2}
Trevélez	703	805	−12.7%	90.96	7.7/km^{2}
Turón	215	292	−26.4%	55.58	3.9/km^{2}
Ugíjar	2,572	2,644	−2.7%	66.96	38.4/km^{2}
Valderrubio	2,078	No data (Note: Valderrubio was partitioned from Pinos Puente and became an independent municipality in 2013 and is thus not included in the 2011 census.)		5.53	375.8/km^{2}
El Valle	947	1,134	−16.5%	25.84	36.6/km^{2}
Valle del Zalabí	2,118	2,313	−8.4%	108.68	19.5/km^{2}
Válor	673	722	−6.8%	58.57	11.5/km^{2}
Vegas del Genil	12,323	9,724	+26.7%	14.14	871.5/km^{2}
Vélez de Benaudalla	3,041	2,864	+6.2%	79.11	38.4/km^{2}
Ventas de Huelma	676	703	−3.8%	42.44	15.9/km^{2}
Villa de Otura	7,600	6,923	+9.8%	24.60	308.9/km^{2}
Villamena	1,005	1,043	−3.6%	20.18	49.8/km^{2}
Villanueva de las Torres	520	687	−24.3%	66.89	7.8/km^{2}
Villanueva Mesía	1,980	2,107	−6.0%	11.16	177.4/km^{2}
Víznar	996	943	+5.6%	13.00	76.6/km^{2}
Zafarraya	2,239	2,195	+2.0%	70.63	31.7/km^{2}
Zagra	890	955	−6.8%	11.34	78.5/km^{2}
La Zubia	20,077	18,425	+9.0%	20.11	998.4/km^{2}
Zújar	2,623	3,012	−12.9%	102.12	25.7/km^{2}
Province of Granada	939,741	922,100	+1.9%	12,645.41	74.3/km^{2}
Andalusia	8,631,862	8,371,270	+3.1%	87,587.59	98.6/km^{2}
Spain	48,619,695	46,815,916	+3.9%	504,755.17	96.3/km^{2}

== See also ==
- Geography of Spain
- List of municipalities of Spain
