= Carataunas =

Carataunas, Spain
- Flag Coat of arms

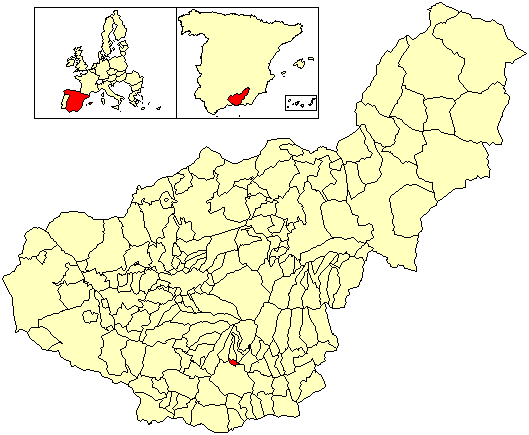
- Location of Carataunas
- Coordinates: 36°55′N 3°24′W
- Country: Spain
- Province: Granada
- Municipality: Carataunas

Area
  - Total: 4.66 km^{2} (1.80 sq mi)
- Elevation: 800 m (2,600 ft)

Population (2025-01-01)
  - Total: 207
  - Density: 44.4/km^{2} (115/sq mi)
- Time zone: UTC+1 (CET)
  - Summer (DST): UTC+2 (CEST)

Carataunas is a municipality located in the province of Granada, Spain. According to the 2005 census (INE), it has a population of 198 inhabitants.

== See also ==
- List of municipalities in Granada
