= Cortes y Graena =

- city
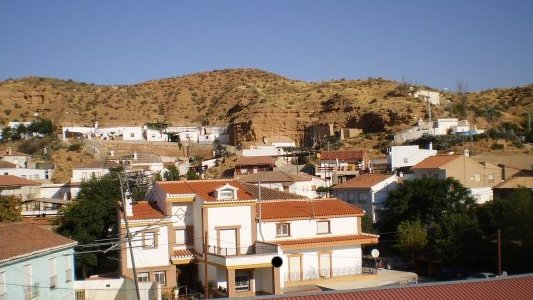

- Coat of arms

- Location in Spain.
- Coordinates: 37°19′N 3°13′W
- Country: Spain
- Province: Granadaa

Area
  - Total: 22 km^{2} (8.5 sq mi)
- Elevation: 971 m (3,186 ft)

Population (2025-01-01)
  - Total: 949
  - Density: 43/km^{2} (110/sq mi)
- Time zone: UTC+1 (CET)
  - Summer (DST): UTC+2 (CEST)
- Website: www.cortesygraena.es

Cortes y Graena is a municipality in the province of Granada, Spain. As of 2010, it has a population of 1033 inhabitants.

== See also ==
- List of municipalities in Granada
