= Marchal, Granada =

Marchal, Spain
- city
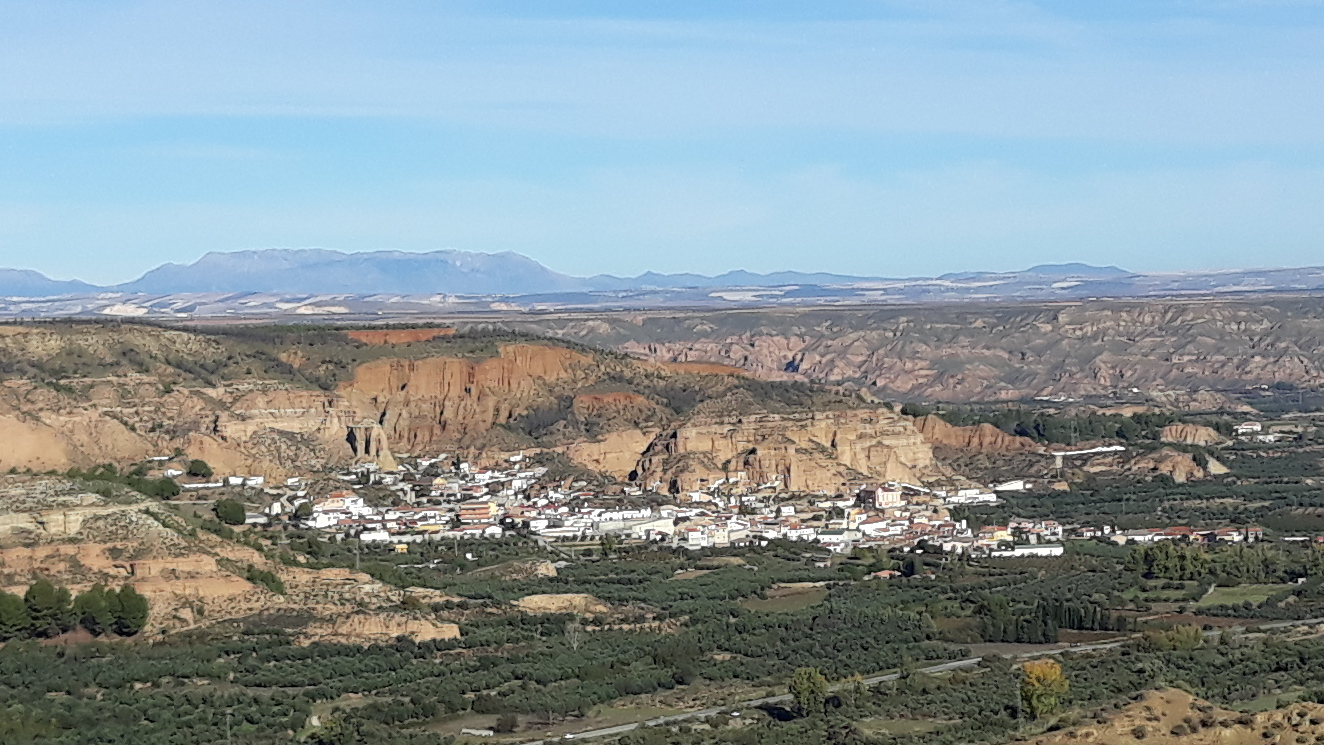

- Flag Coat of arms

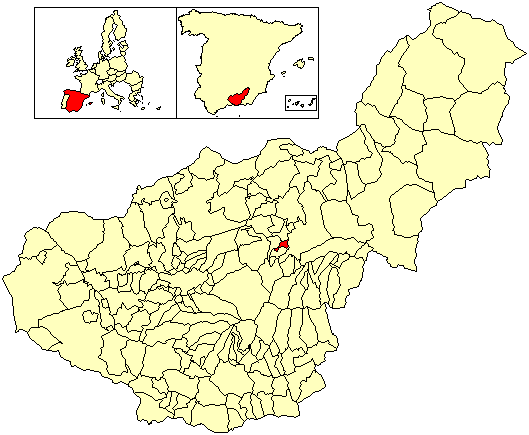
- Location of Marchal
- Coordinates: 37°17′N 3°12′W
- Country: Spain
- Province: Granada
- Municipality: Marchal

Area
  - Total: 7 km^{2} (2.7 sq mi)
- Elevation: 905 m (2,969 ft)

Population (2025-01-01)
  - Total: 437
  - Density: 62/km^{2} (160/sq mi)
- Time zone: UTC+1 (CET)
  - Summer (DST): UTC+2 (CEST)

Marchal is a municipality located in the province of Granada, Spain. According to the 2005 census (INE), the city has a population of 404 inhabitants.

== See also ==
- List of municipalities in Granada
