= Cijuela =

Cijuela, Spain
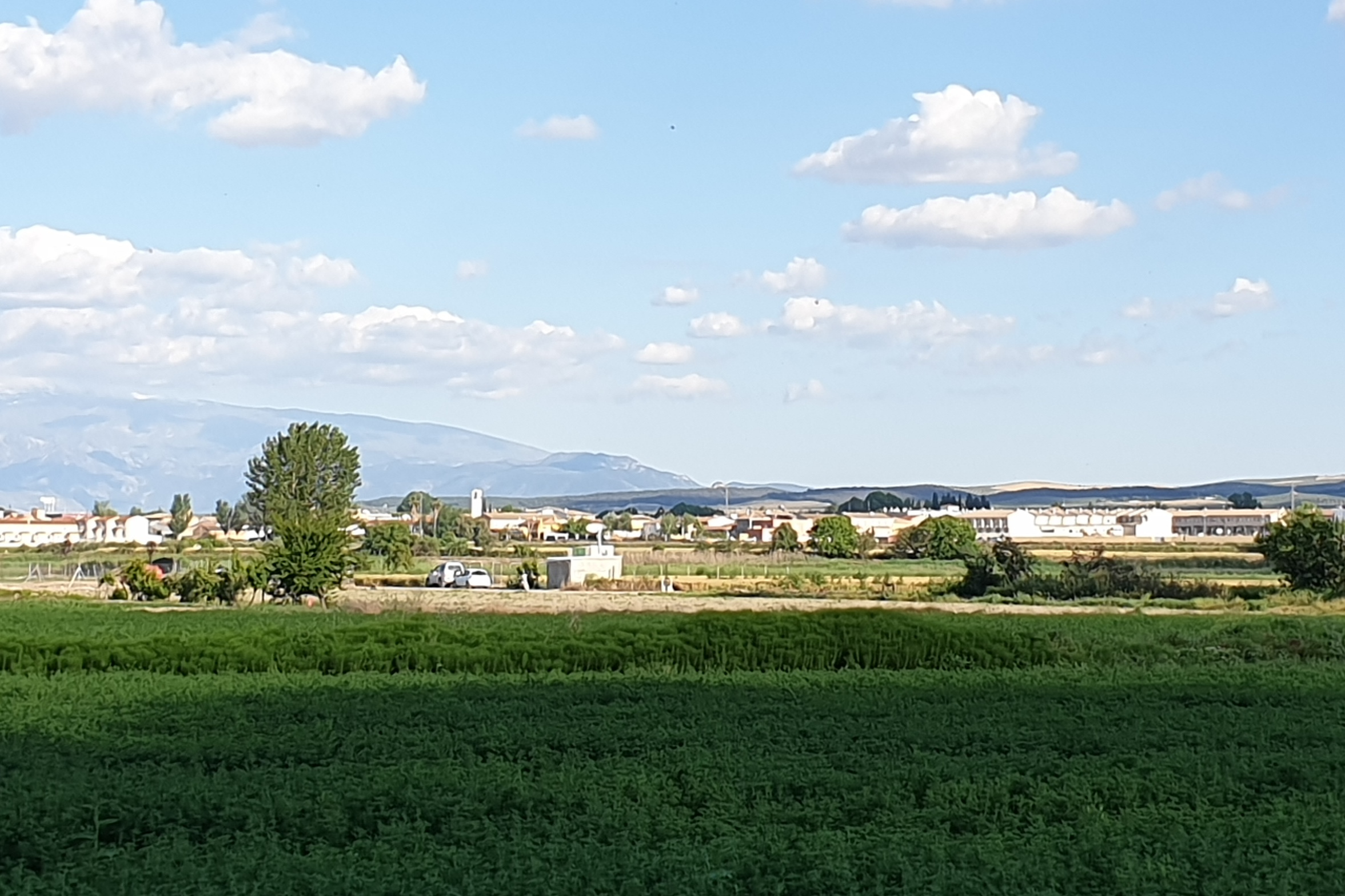

- Coat of arms

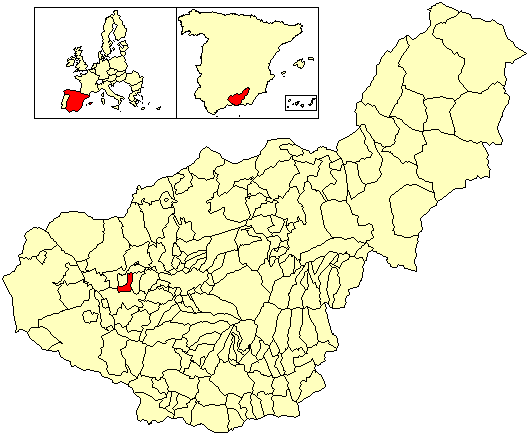
- Location of Cijuela
- Coordinates: 37°12′N 3°48′W
- Country: Spain
- Province: Granada
- Municipality: Cijuela

Area
  - Total: 17 km^{2} (6.6 sq mi)
- Elevation: 540 m (1,770 ft)

Population (2025-01-01)
  - Total: 3,827
  - Density: 230/km^{2} (580/sq mi)
- Time zone: UTC+1 (CET)
  - Summer (DST): UTC+2 (CEST)

Cijuela is a municipality located in the province of Granada, Spain. According to the 2005 census (INE), the city has a population of 2009 inhabitants.

== See also ==
- List of municipalities in Granada
