= Valderrubio =

- Municipality
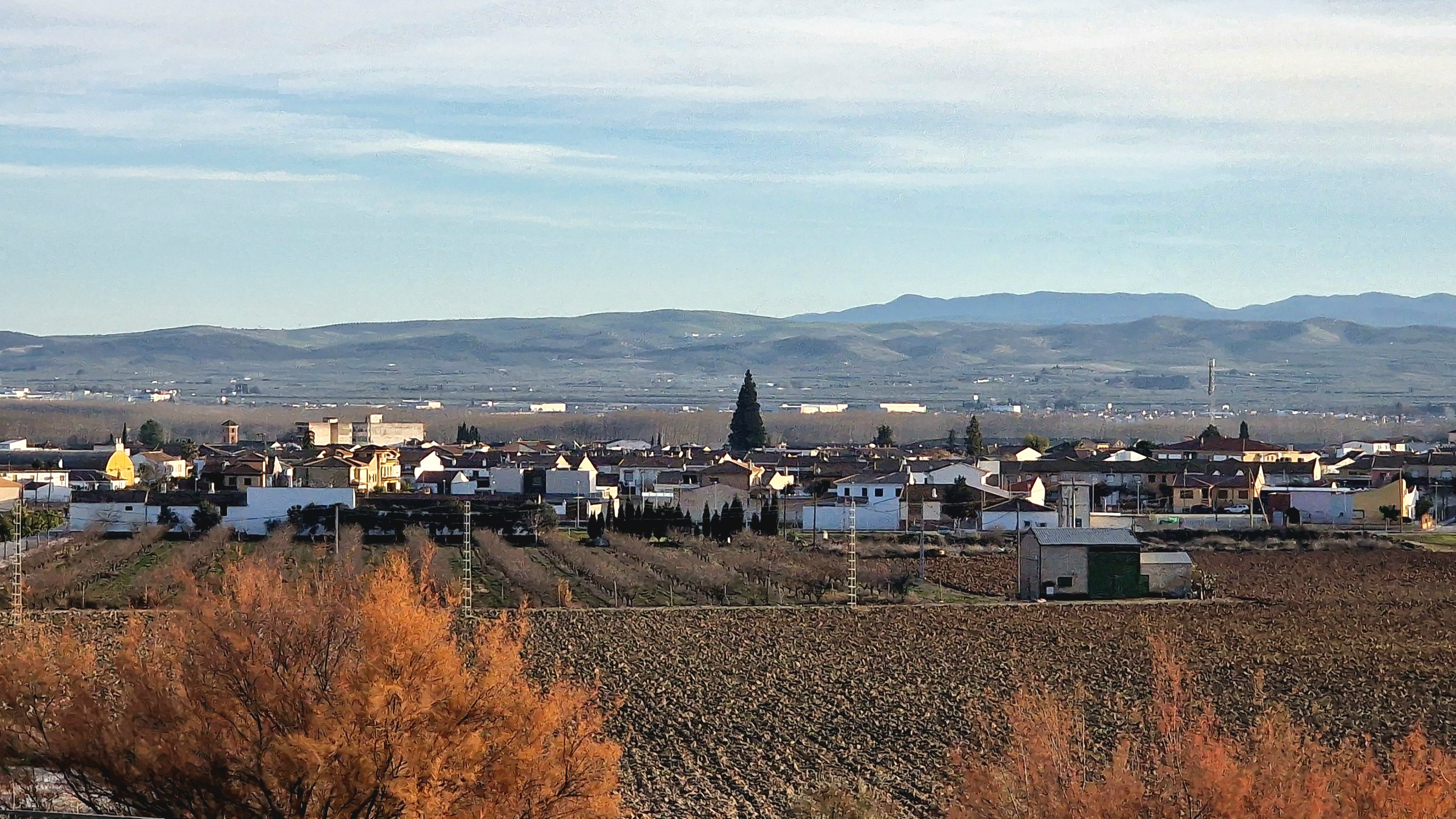

- Flag Coat of arms

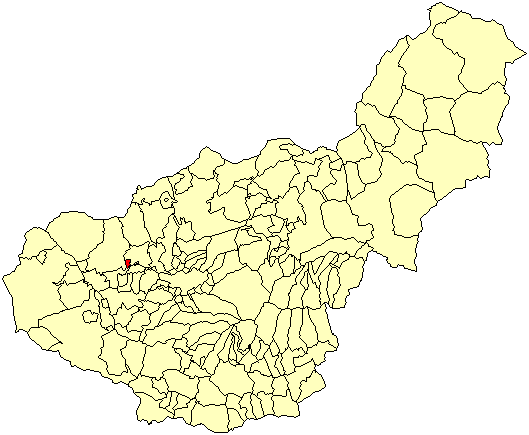
- Location of Valderrubio

- Location in Spain
- Coordinates: 37°14′04″N 3°49′25″W
- Country: Spain
- Province: Granada
- Comarca: Vega de Granada
- Judicial district: Granada

Government
  - Mayor: Francisca Blanco Martín (PSOE)

Area
  - Total: 6.59 km^{2} (2.54 sq mi)
- Elevation: 550 m (1,800 ft)

Population (2025-01-01)
  - Total: 2,069
  - Density: 314/km^{2} (813/sq mi)
- Demonym: valderrubiense
- Postal code: 18250
- Website: Official website

Valderrubio is a municipality in the province of Granada, Spain. As of 2012, it had a population of 2,133 inhabitants.

The poet Federico García Lorca lived in the village as a young child, between 1905 and 1909. At that time it was known as Asquerosa (which means 'filthy' in Spanish), although it is suggested that the original name derived from the Latin 'Aqua Rosae' (Rose Water). It was renamed Valderrubio in 1943.

== See also ==
- List of municipalities in Granada
