= La Malahá =

La Malahá, Spain
- city
- Flag Coat of arms

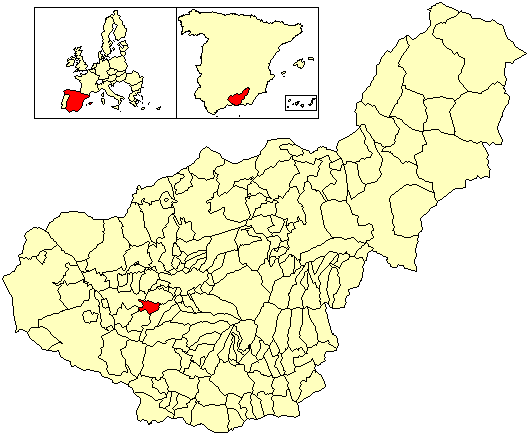
- Location of La Malahá
- Coordinates: 37°06′N 3°43′W
- Country: Spain
- Province: Granada
- Municipality: La Malahá

Area
  - Total: 25 km^{2} (9.7 sq mi)
- Elevation: 714 m (2,343 ft)

Population (2025-01-01)
  - Total: 1,928
  - Density: 77/km^{2} (200/sq mi)
- Time zone: UTC+1 (CET)
  - Summer (DST): UTC+2 (CEST)

La Malahá is a municipality located in the province of Granada, Spain. According to the 2005 census (INE), the city has a population of 1,679 inhabitants. La Malaha is located at the foot of the mining hill of Montevives.

== See also ==
- List of municipalities in Granada
