= Polopos, Granada =

Spanish village

Coordinates: 37°22′N 4°08′W

Polopos
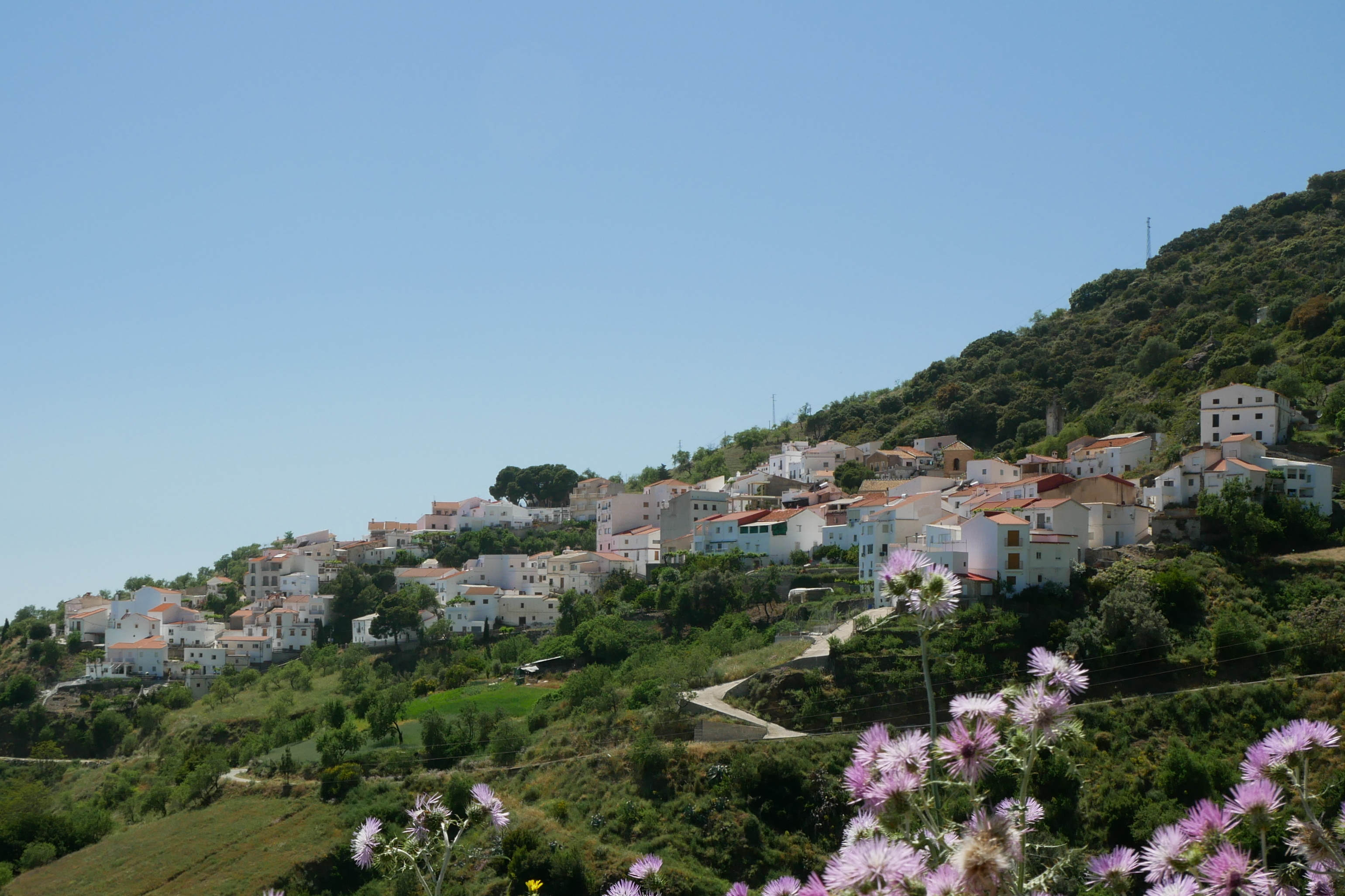

- Flag Coat of arms

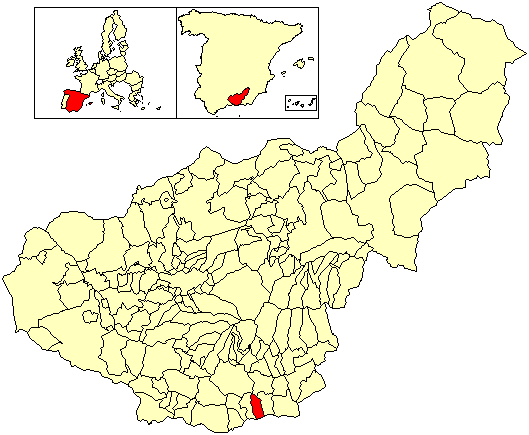
- Location of Polopos
- Country: Spain
- Province: Granada
- Comarca: Alpujarra Granadina

Population (2025-01-01)
  - Total: 1,682
- Time zone: UTC+1 (CET)
  - Summer (DST): UTC+2 (CEST)
- Website: Official website

Polopos is a village in the municipality Polopos-La Mamola in the province of Granada, Spain. As of 2010, the municipality has a population of 1856 inhabitants, most of which live in the coastal village La Mamola. Polopos used to be the main village with 1200 villagers living there in the 18th and 19th centuries. Most of the families moved away in the second half of the 20th century to find work in the cities or to live on the coast. As of 2019 it was home to 53 people.

Polopos got a boost in popularity due to Dutch reality TV program Het Spaanse Dorp Polopos (the Spanish village Polopos) in 2019. Five Dutch couples were followed to see who was most successful in restoring a dilapidated house allotted to each of them, setting up a business in the village, learning Spanish and integrating with the local population. Since then, the population has risen to 80 people, a restaurant and an art gallery opened their doors and concerts, and art exhibitions attracted many visitors. Spanish media regularly visit the village to see if the experiment of the TV show is successful in fighting the general problem of 'España vaciada', or empty Spain, where villages with an ever decreasing and ageing population are deteriorating more and more and are sometimes abandoned all together.

== See also ==
- List of municipalities in Granada
