= Lújar =

Lújar, Spain
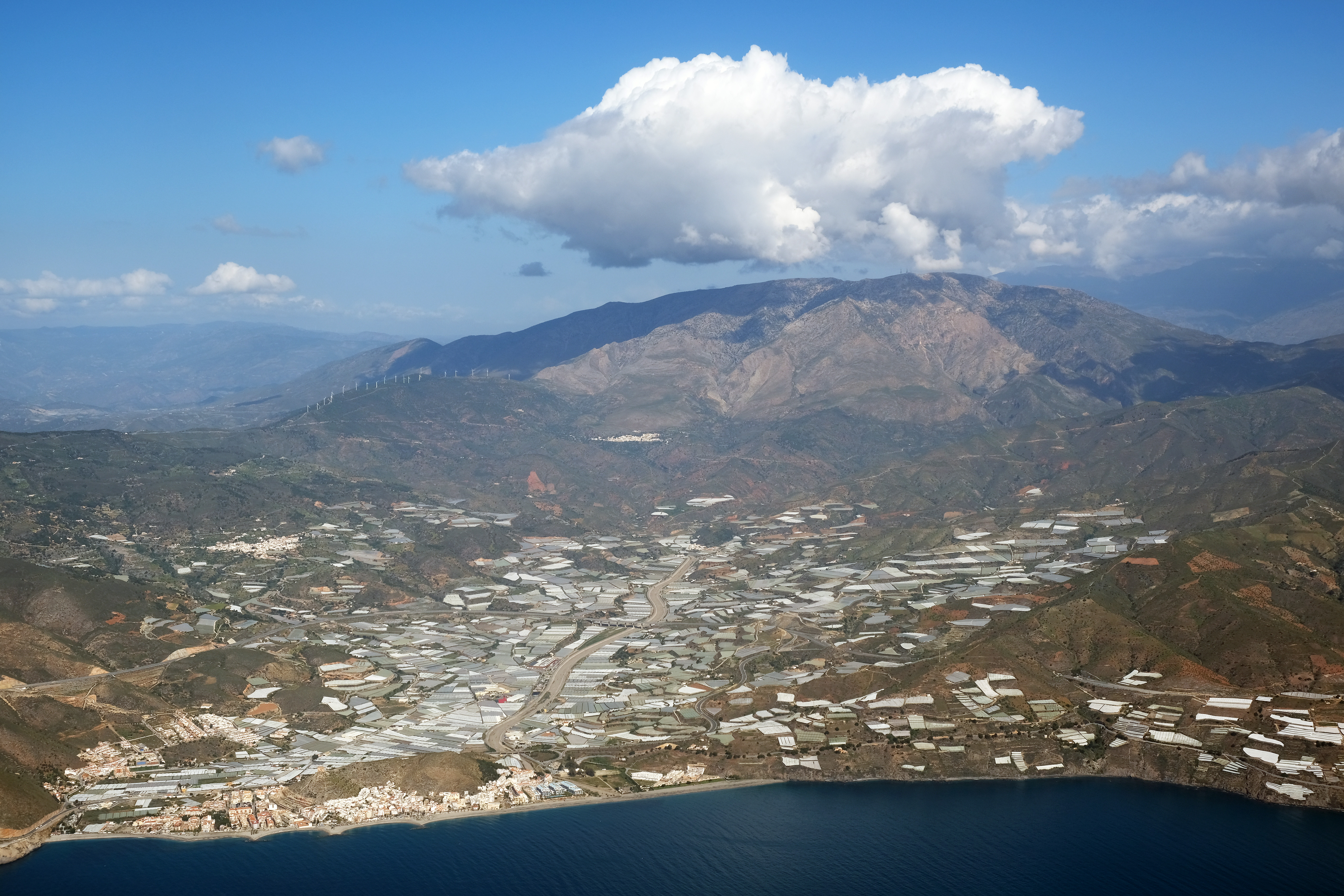

- Flag Coat of arms

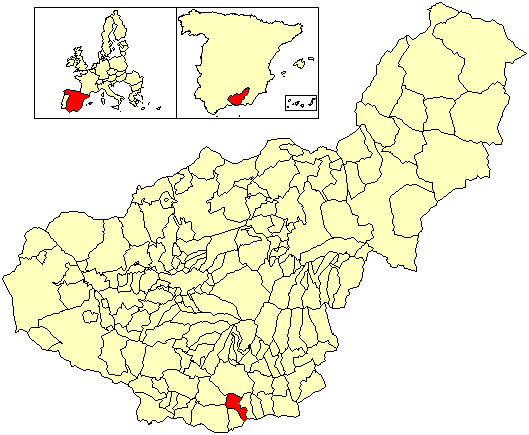
- Location of Lújar
- Coordinates: 36°47′15″N 3°24′5″W
- Country: Spain
- Autonomous community: Andalusia
- Province: Granada
- Municipality: Lújar

Government
  - Mayor: José Antonio González Cabrera (People's Party)

Area
  - Total: 36.88 km^{2} (14.24 sq mi)
- Elevation: 895 m (2,936 ft)

Population (2023)
  - Total: 480
  - Density: 13/km^{2} (34/sq mi)
- Time zone: UTC+1 (CET)
  - Summer (DST): UTC+2 (CEST)

Lújar is a village in southern Spain in the Sierra Nevada, 7 kilometres inland from the coast along a fairly precipitous road, and 26 km from the city of Motril. Its population is approximately 500.

== History ==
The village was one of the first to be taken during the Spanish Civil War.

== Facilities ==
There is a municipal open air swimming pool at the western end of the village, and a couple of bars.

== See also ==
- List of municipalities in Granada
