= Chimeneas =

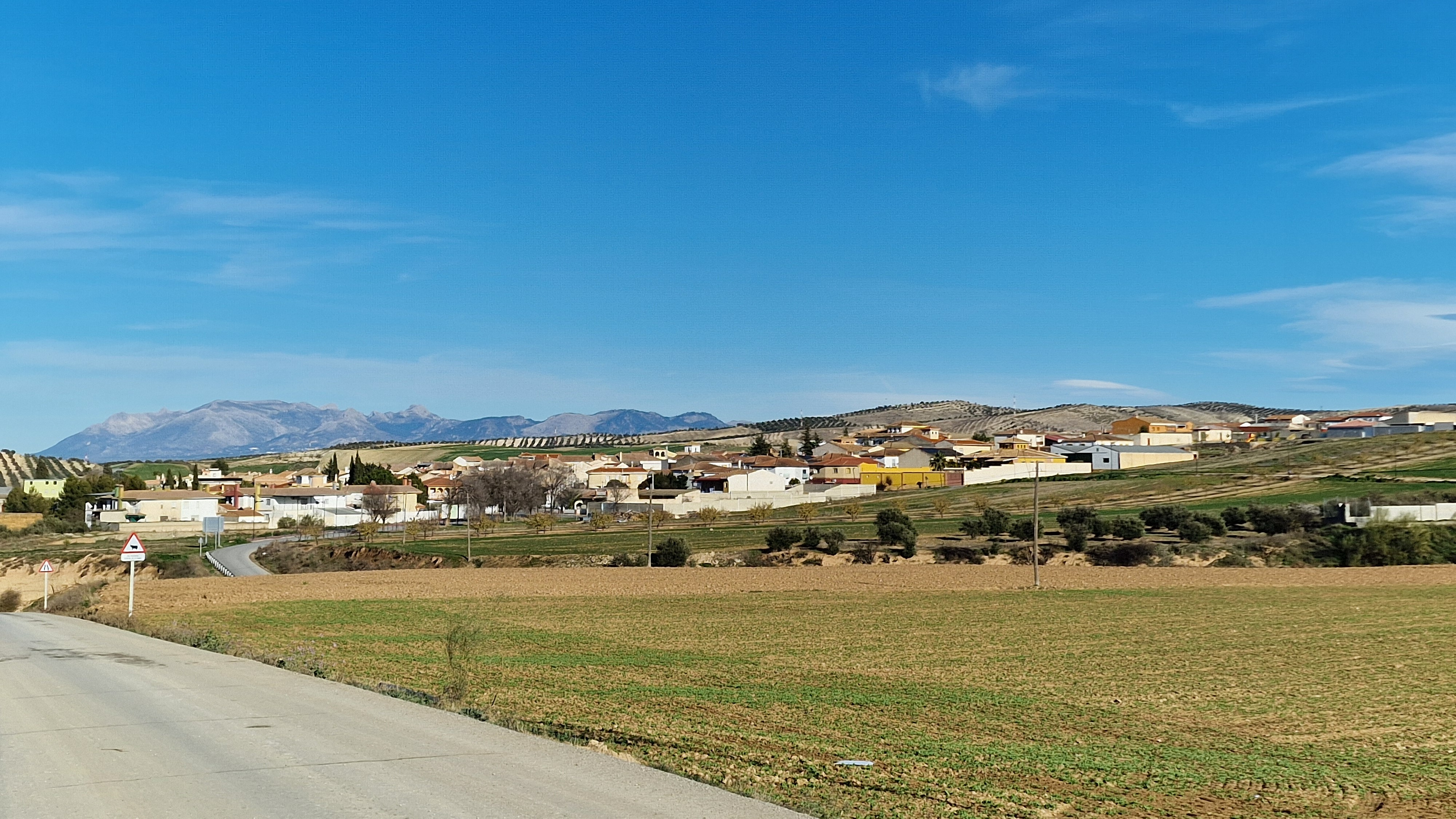

- Flag Coat of arms

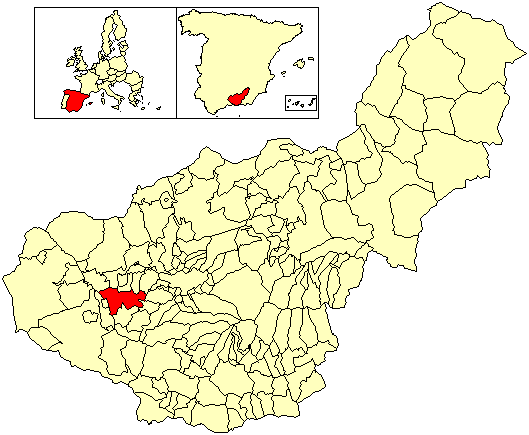
- Location of Chimeneas
- Coordinates: 37°08′N 3°49′W
- Country: Spain
- Province: Granada
- Municipality: Chimeneas

Area
  - Total: 91 km^{2} (35 sq mi)
- Elevation: 684 m (2,244 ft)

Population (2025-01-01)
  - Total: 1,265
  - Density: 14/km^{2} (36/sq mi)
- Time zone: UTC+1 (CET)
  - Summer (DST): UTC+2 (CEST)

Chimeneas is a municipality located in the province of Granada, Spain. According to the 2005 census (INE), the city has a population of 1,485 inhabitants.

== See also ==
- List of municipalities in Granada
