= Moraleda de Zafayona =

Coordinates: 37°10′N 3°58′W

Moraleda de Zafayona, Spain
- town
- Coat of arms

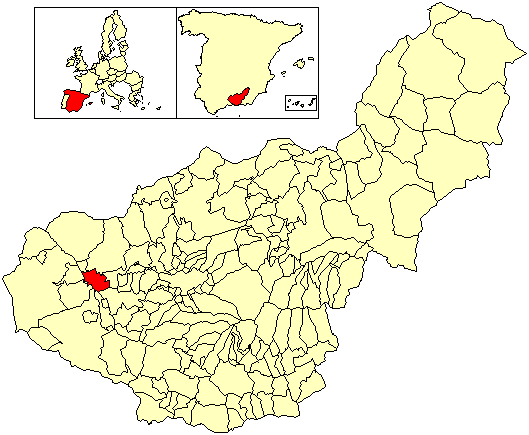
- Location of Moraleda de Zafayona
- Country: Spain
- Province: Granada
- Municipality: Moraleda de Zafayona

Area
  - Total: 48 km^{2} (19 sq mi)
- Elevation: 616 m (2,021 ft)

Population (2025-01-01)
  - Total: 3,214
  - Density: 67/km^{2} (170/sq mi)
- Time zone: UTC+1 (CET)
  - Summer (DST): UTC+2 (CEST)

Moraleda de Zafayona is a municipality located in the province of Granada, Spain. According to the 2004 census (INE), the town's population was 2769.

It is mainly a farming community with ancillary trades and workshops. It has two banks, a medical centre, prep/junior and senior schools, a sub-post office, a library, five small supermarkets, four petrol stations, a summer-time lido, two small hotels, bakers and a number of bars.

== See also ==
- List of municipalities in Granada
