= Darro, Spain =

Darro
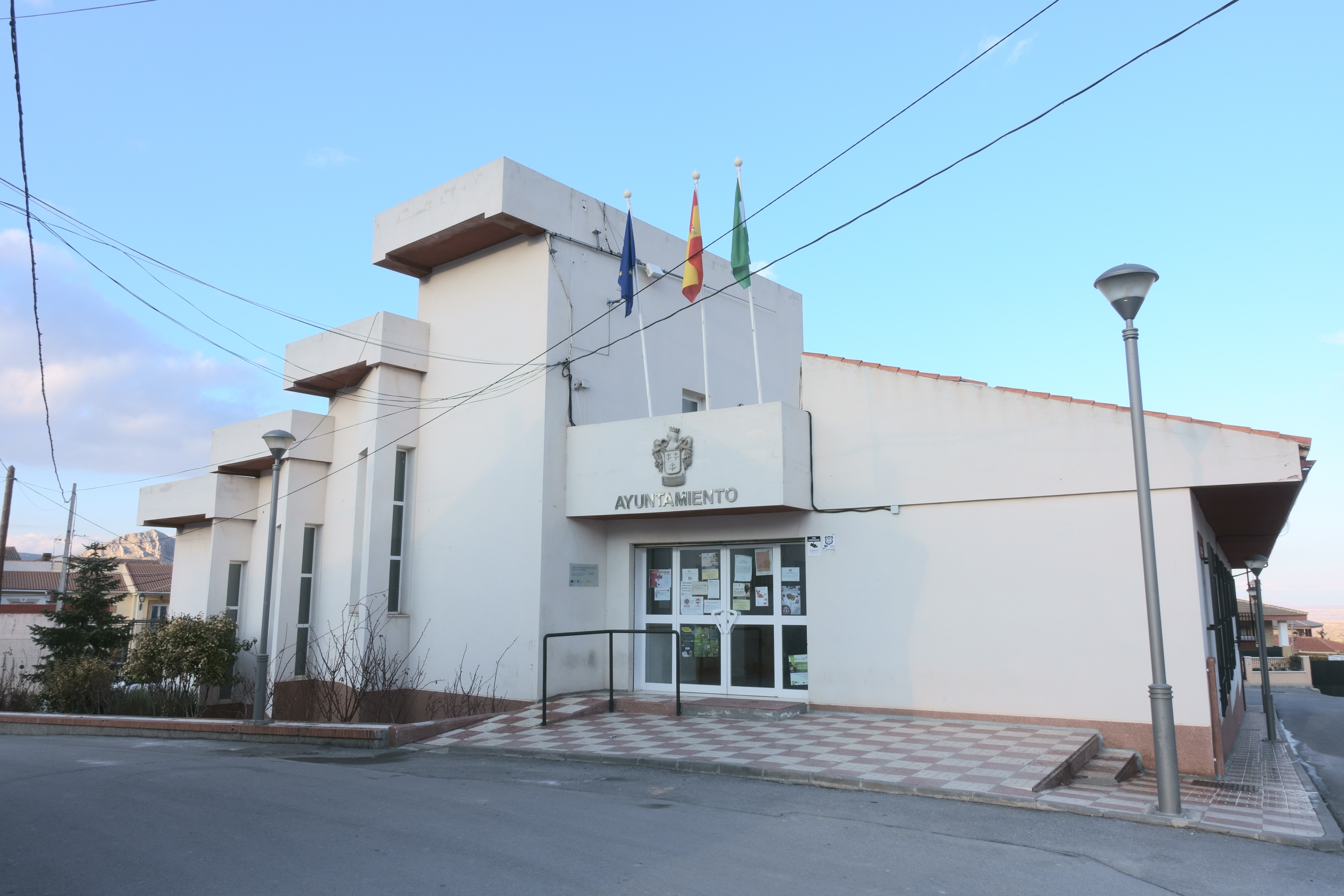

- Coat of arms

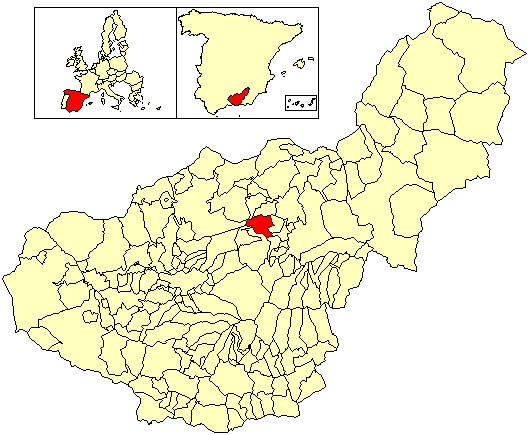

- Location in Spain
- Coordinates: 37°21′N 3°18′W
- Country: Spain
- Autonomous community: Andalusia
- Province: Córdoba

Area
  - Total: 50 km^{2} (19 sq mi)
- Elevation: 1,120 m (3,670 ft)

Population (2025-01-01)
  - Total: 1,700
  - Density: 34/km^{2} (88/sq mi)
- Time zone: UTC+1 (CET)
  - Summer (DST): UTC+2 (CEST)

Darro is a municipality in the province of Granada, Spain. As of 2010, it has a population of 1,462 inhabitants.

== See also ==
- List of municipalities in Granada
