= Pulianas =

Coordinates: 37°13′N 3°36′W

Pulianas, Spain
- city
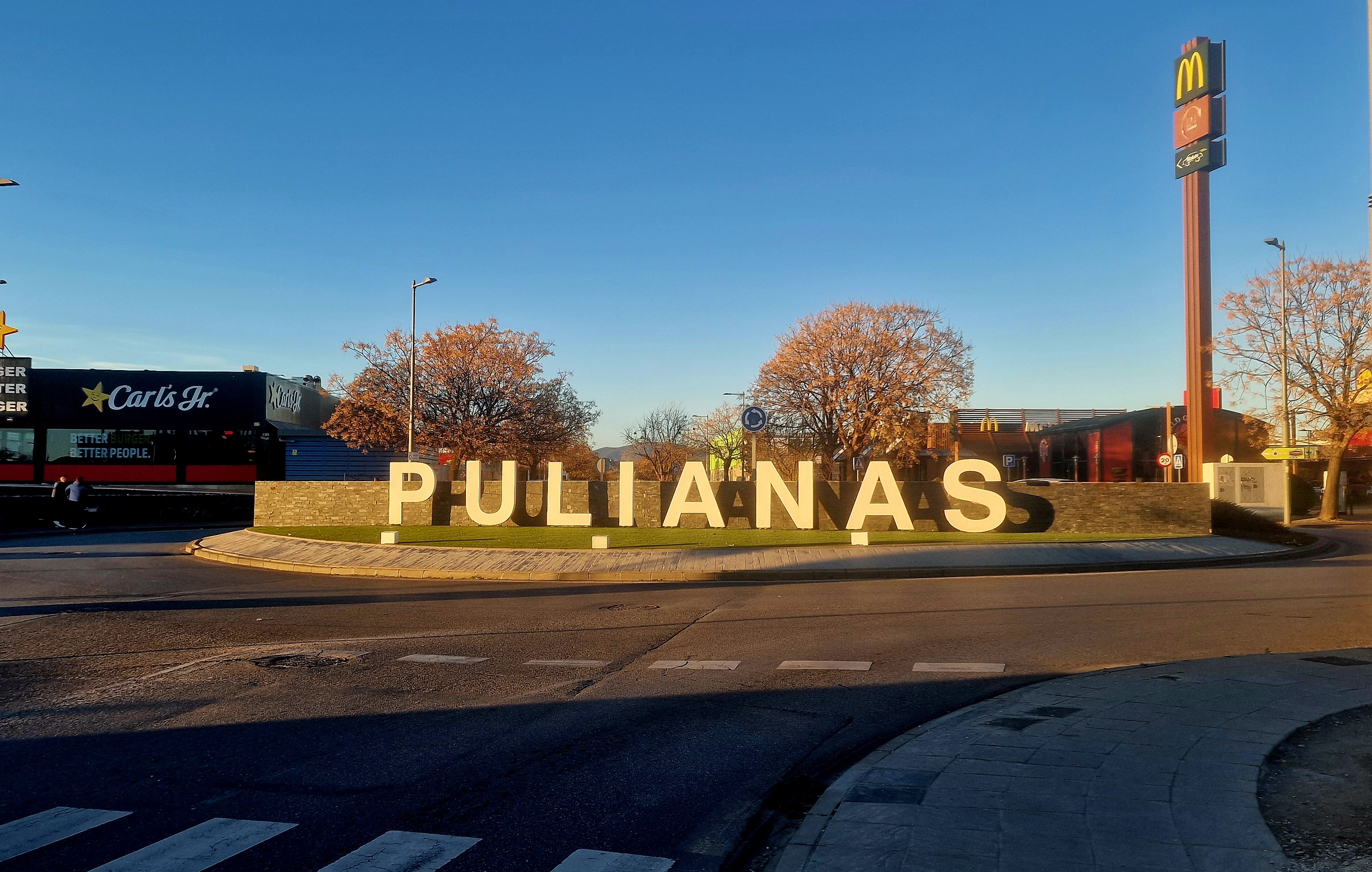

- Flag Coat of arms

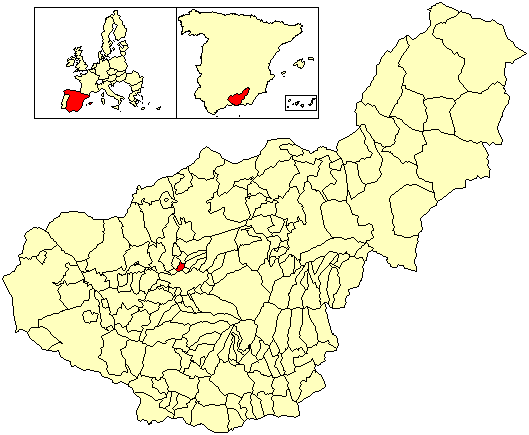
- Location of Pulianas
- Country: Spain
- Province: Granada
- Municipality: Pulianas

Area
  - Total: 6 km^{2} (2.3 sq mi)
- Elevation: 741 m (2,431 ft)

Population (2025-01-01)
  - Total: 5,659
  - Density: 940/km^{2} (2,400/sq mi)
- Time zone: UTC+1 (CET)
  - Summer (DST): UTC+2 (CEST)

Pulianas is a municipality located in the province of Granada, Spain. According to the 2025 census (INE), the city has a population of 5659 inhabitants.

== See also ==
- List of municipalities in Granada
