= Polícar =

Polícar, Spain
- city
- Flag Coat of arms

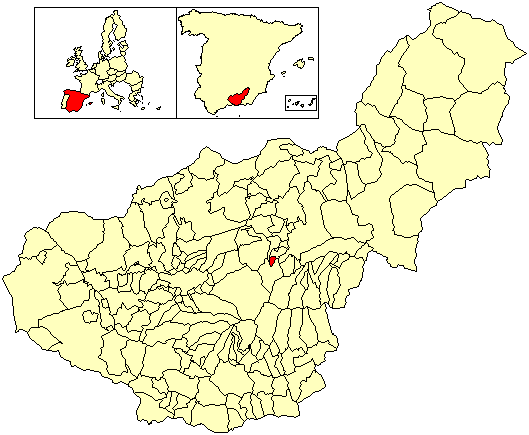
- Location of Polícar
- Coordinates: 37.258°N 3.233°W
- Country: Spain
- Province: Granada
- Municipality: Polícar

Area
  - Total: 5 km^{2} (1.9 sq mi)
- Elevation: 1,154 m (3,786 ft)

Population (2025-01-01)
  - Total: 252
  - Density: 50/km^{2} (130/sq mi)
- Time zone: UTC+1 (CET)
  - Summer (DST): UTC+2 (CEST)

Polícar is a municipality located in the province of Granada, Spain. According to the 2004 census (INE), the city has a population of 241 inhabitants.

== See also ==
- List of municipalities in Granada
