= Ítrabo =

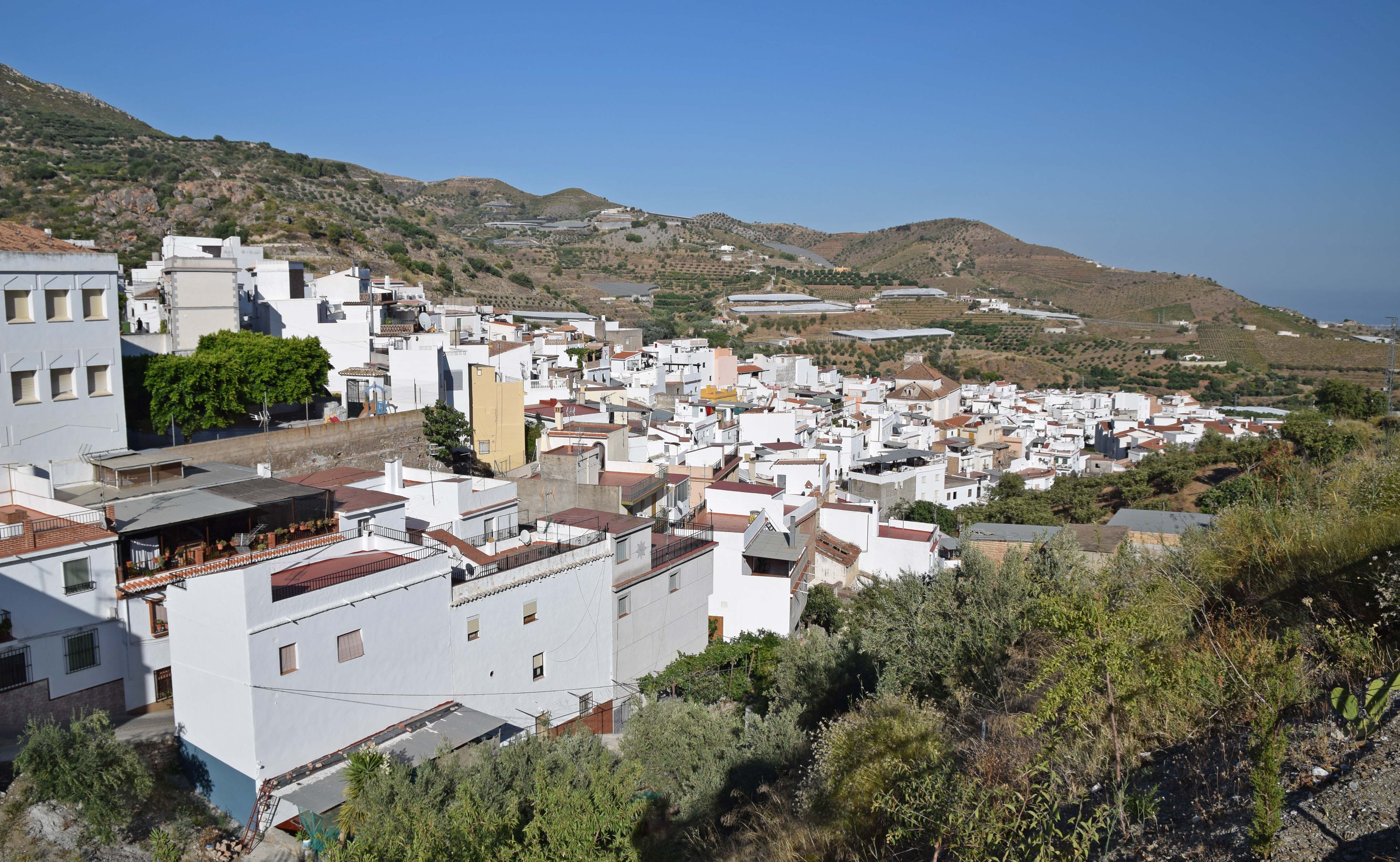

- Coat of arms

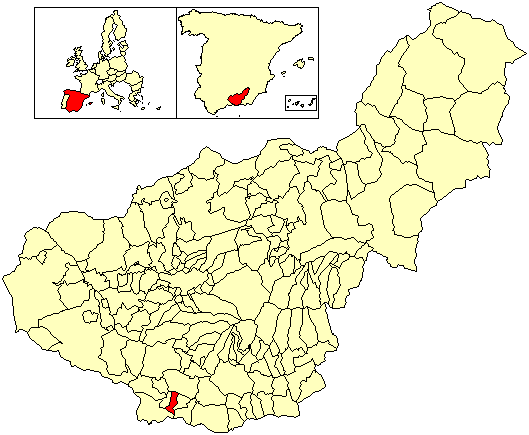

- Location of Ítrabo in Spain
- Coordinates: 36°48′N 3°38′W
- Country: Spain
- Autonomous community: Andalusia
- Province: Granada

Area
  - Total: 19 km^{2} (7.3 sq mi)
- Elevation: 390 m (1,280 ft)

Population (2025-01-01)
  - Total: 1,022
  - Density: 54/km^{2} (140/sq mi)
- Time zone: UTC+1 (CET)
  - Summer (DST): UTC+2 (CEST)

Ítrabo is a municipality in the province of Granada, Spain. As of 2010 Itrabo had a population of 1,152 inhabitants.

== See also ==
- List of municipalities in Granada
