= Lentegí =

Coordinates: 36°50′N 3°40′W

- city
- Flag Coat of arms

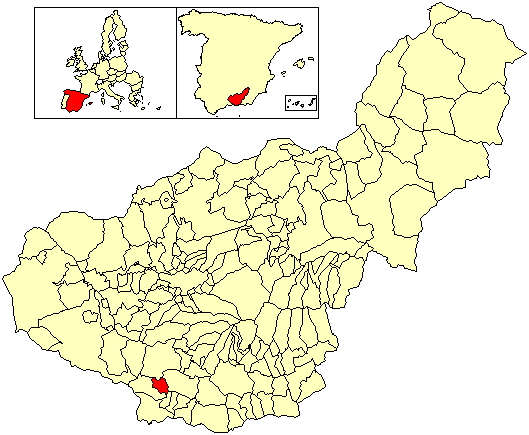
- Location of Lentegí
- Country: Spain
- Province: Granada
- Municipality: Lentegí

Area
  - Total: 23 km^{2} (8.9 sq mi)

Population (2025-01-01)
  - Total: 368
  - Density: 16/km^{2} (41/sq mi)
- Time zone: UTC+1 (CET)
  - Summer (DST): UTC+2 (CEST)

Lentegí is a municipality located in the province of Granada, Spain. According to the 2006 census (INE), the city has a population of 342 inhabitants.

== See also ==
- List of municipalities in Granada
