= Salar, Spain =

Coordinates: 37°08′56″N 4°04′04″W

Salar
- Flag Coat of arms

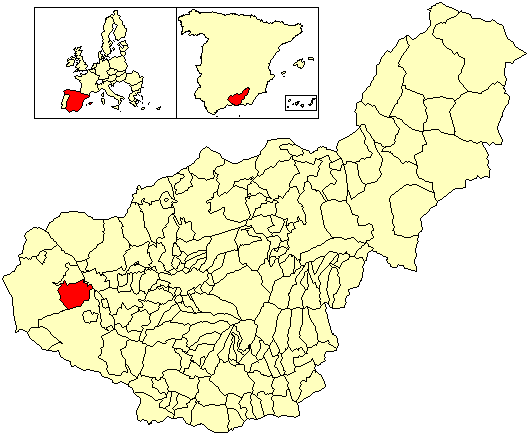

- Location in Spain.
- Country: Spain
- Autonomous community: Andalusia
- Province: Granada

Area
  - Total: 85.6 km^{2} (33.1 sq mi)
- Elevation: 544 m (1,785 ft)

Population (2025-01-01)
  - Total: 2,582
  - Density: 30.2/km^{2} (78.1/sq mi)
- Time zone: UTC+1 (CET)
  - Summer (DST): UTC+2 (CEST)
- Website: www.salar.es

Salar is a municipality in the province of Granada, Spain.

== Demography ==
The population has declined from 2010, when it had a population of 2831 inhabitants.

== See also ==
- List of municipalities in Granada

== History ==
Salar is the site of a Roman villa on the western slope of the Genil basin (near the route of the new AVE line to Granada). Since its discovery in 2004, the villa has been partly excavated and has attracted thousands of visitors. In 2026, work on the site had to be postponed because of bad weather.
