= Dúdar =

- Municipality
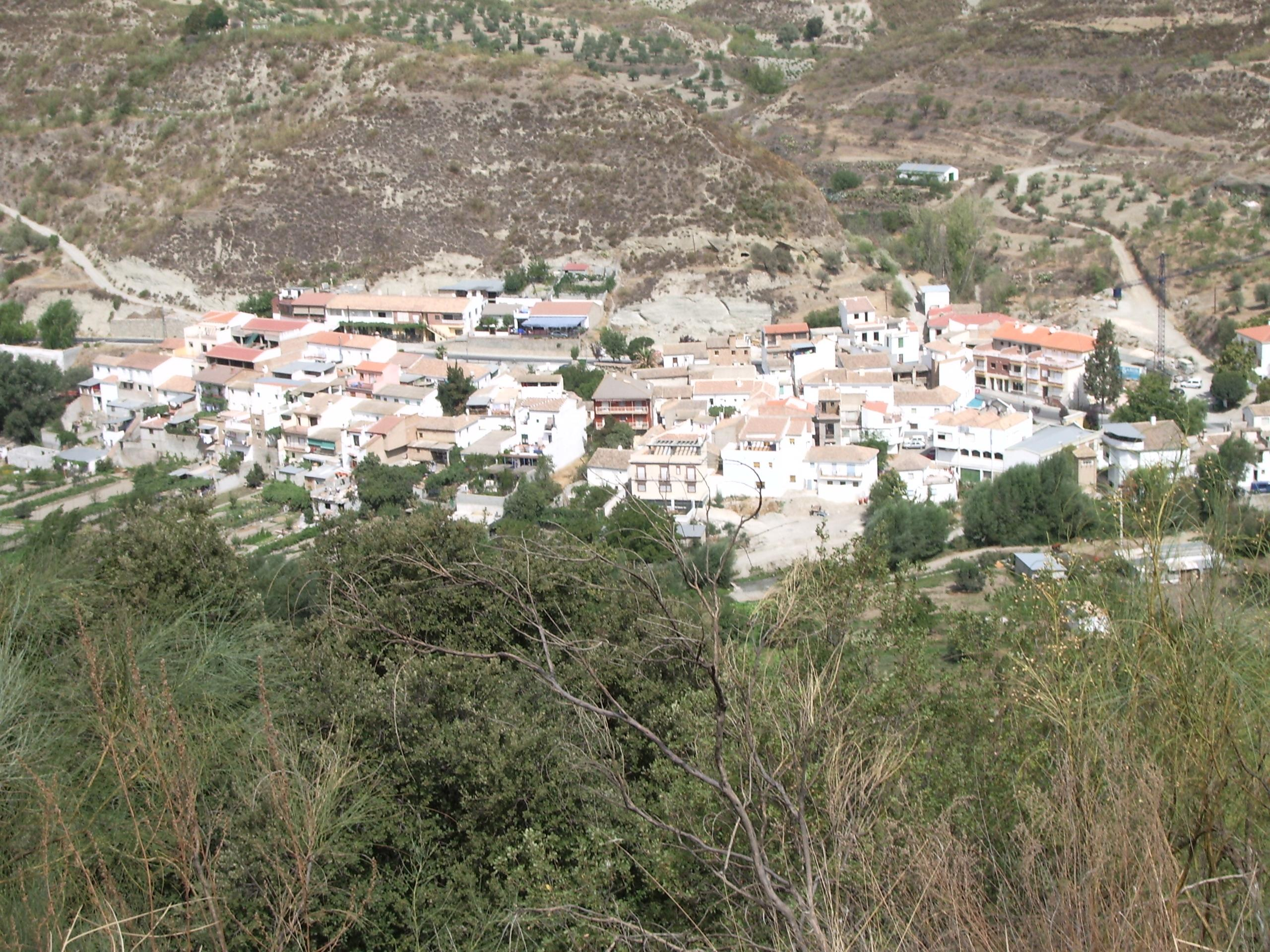

- Flag Coat of arms

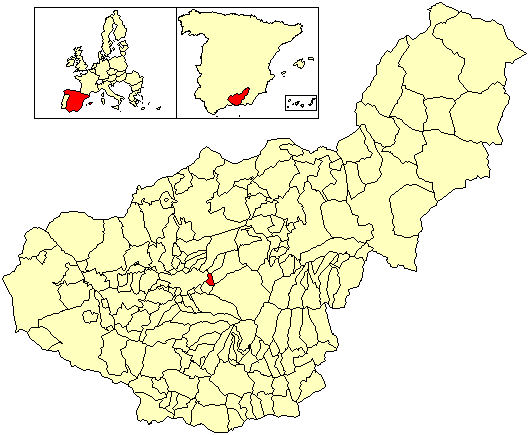
- Location of Dúdar
- Coordinates: 37°11′N 3°29′W
- Country: Spain
- Province: Granada
- Municipality: Dúdar

Area
  - Total: 8 km^{2} (3.1 sq mi)
- Elevation: 810 m (2,660 ft)

Population (2025-01-01)
  - Total: 382
  - Density: 48/km^{2} (120/sq mi)
- Time zone: UTC+1 (CET)
  - Summer (DST): UTC+2 (CEST)

Dúdar is a municipality located in the province of Granada, Spain. According to the 2005 census (INE), it has a population of 299 inhabitants.

== See also ==
- List of municipalities in Granada
