= Cáñar =

- Municipality
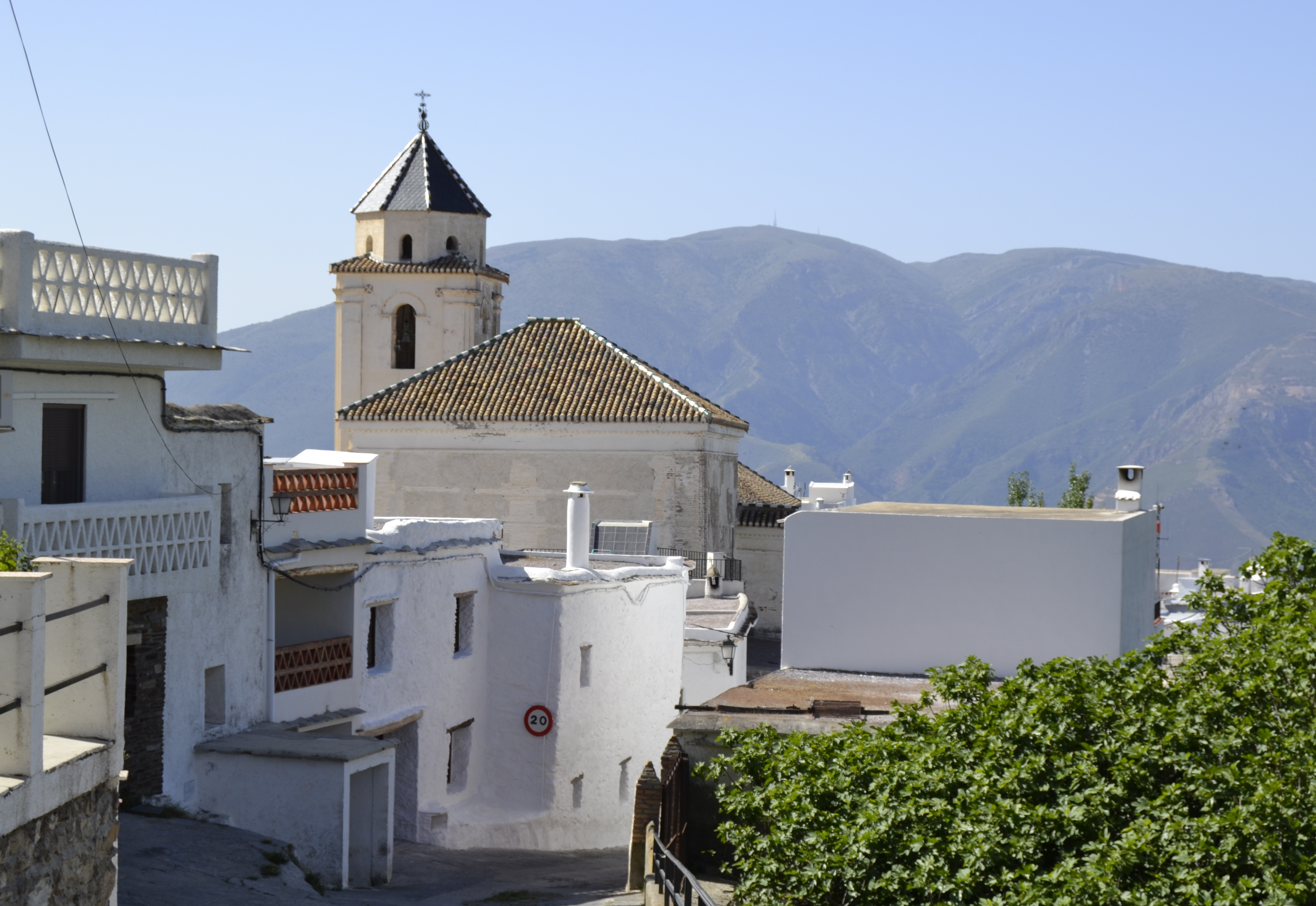

- Flag Coat of arms

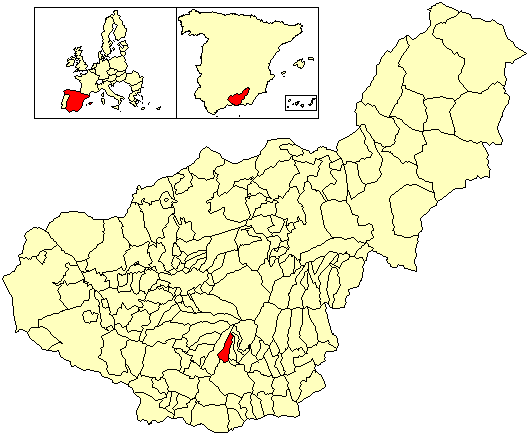
- Location of Cáñar

- Location in Spain
- Coordinates: 36°55′N 3°25′W
- Country: Spain
- Autonomous community: Andalusia
- Province: Granada
- Comarca: Alpujarras
- Judicial district: Órgiva

Government
  - Alcalde: Francisco Hidalgo Álvarez (2007) (PSOE)

Area
  - Total: 26 km^{2} (10 sq mi)
- Elevation: 1,014 m (3,327 ft)

Population (2025-01-01)
  - Total: 424
  - Density: 16/km^{2} (42/sq mi)
- Demonym: Cañarete
- Time zone: UTC+1 (CET)
  - Summer (DST): UTC+2 (CEST)
- Postal code: 18418

Cáñar is a small village in the Alpujarras comarca of the province of Granada in Spain. It is located a few kilometres north of the road from Órgiva to Pampaneira and the high Alpujarras. The GR 7 long-distance footpath, following the ancient highway through the Alpujarras, runs through the village.

The area of the municipality is 26 km^{2}., and it is located at a height of 1014 metres above sea level. Its population in 2005 was estimated as 366 people, of whom 69 were not Spanish citizens, most of these being citizens of other European Union countries. The village has a few facilities for tourists including a handful of bars, and is of a very traditional Alpujarran character, with former animal stabling integrated into houses that open onto the main street and square. The "patrona" of the village is Santa Ana and the associated fiesta takes place on and around 26 July each year.

Cáñar has several accommodation options ranging from small apartments to let in the village, cortijos further up into the sierra and a boutique hotel is situated just 2 km outside the village.

Between Cáñar and the neighbouring village to the east, Soportújar, lies a remarkable dam across the deep gorge of the Chico river. This is known as "Dique 24" and was built in 1942 to control the destructive flash floods that the Rio Chico sometimes unleashes. The GR7 footpath crosses the stream just above the dam.

== See also ==
- List of municipalities in Granada
