= Beas de Guadix =

Coordinates: 37°17′N 3°12′W

- city
- View of Beas de Guadix

- Flag Coat of arms

- Location in Spain.
- Country: Spain
- Autonomous community: Andalusia
- Province: Granada

Area
  - Total: 16.24 km^{2} (6.27 sq mi)
- Elevation: 950 m (3,120 ft)

Population (2025-01-01)
  - Total: 318
  - Density: 19.6/km^{2} (50.7/sq mi)
- Time zone: UTC+1 (CET)
  - Summer (DST): UTC+2 (CEST)
- Website: www.beasdeguadix.es

Beas de Guadix is a municipality in the province of Granada, Spain. As of 2010, it has a population of 396 inhabitants.

== See also ==
- List of municipalities in Granada
