= Huélago =

Coordinates: 37°25′N 3°15′W

Huélago, Spain
- city
- Coat of arms

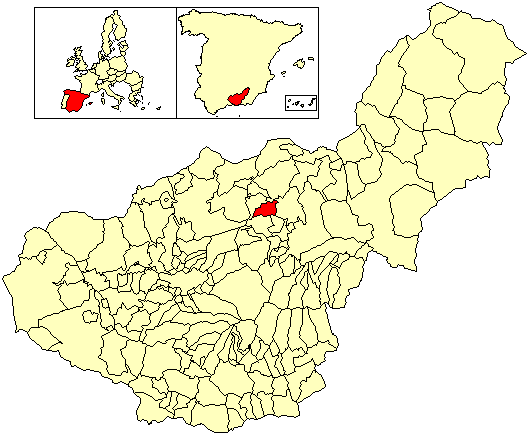
- Location of Huélago
- Country: Spain
- Province: Granada
- Municipality: Huélago

Area
  - Total: 32 km^{2} (12 sq mi)
- Elevation: 913 m (2,995 ft)

Population (2025-01-01)
  - Total: 343
  - Density: 11/km^{2} (28/sq mi)
- Time zone: UTC+1 (CET)
  - Summer (DST): UTC+2 (CEST)

Huélago is a municipality located in the province of Granada, Spain. According to the 2018 census (INE), the city has a population of 388 inhabitants.

== See also ==
- List of municipalities in Granada
