= Almegíjar =

Coordinates: 36°54′N 3°18′W

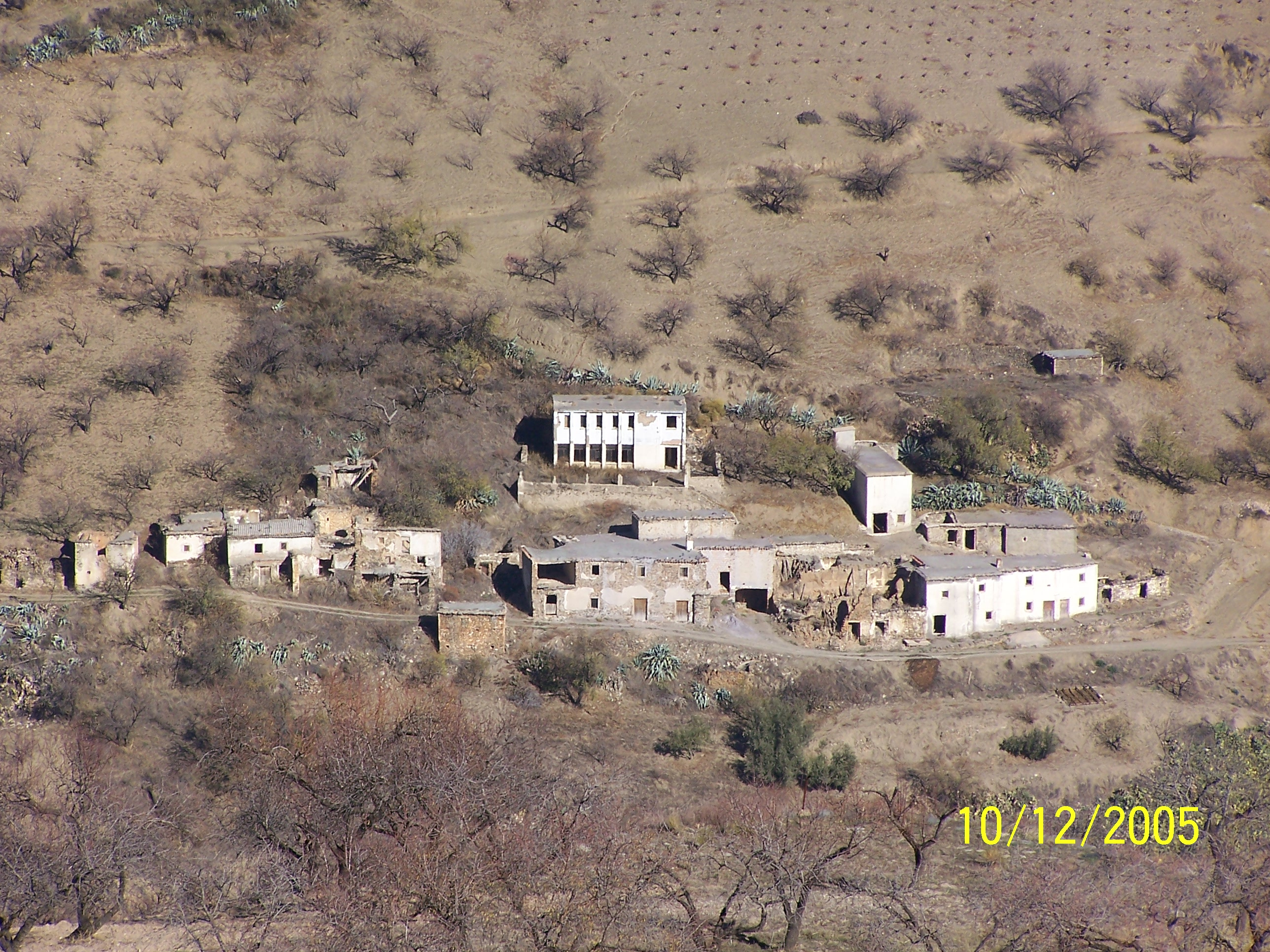
- An abandoned Cortijada in the Sierra de la Contraviesa, near Almegíjar

- Coat of arms

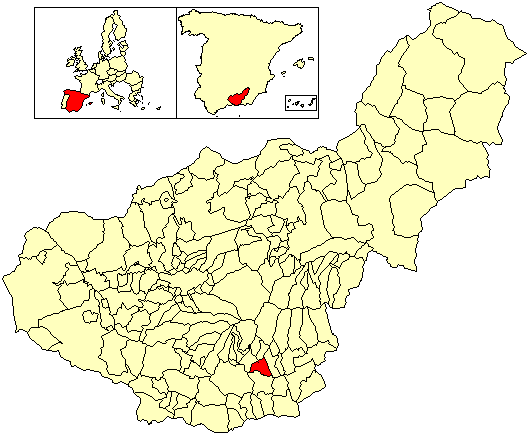
- Location of Almegíjar
- Country: Spain
- Aut. community: Andalusia
- Province: Granada
- Comarca: Alpujarra Granadina
- Judicial district: Órgiva

Area
  - Total: 30 km^{2} (12 sq mi)
- Elevation: 812 m (2,664 ft)

Population (2025-01-01)
  - Total: 327
  - Density: 11/km^{2} (28/sq mi)
- Time zone: UTC+1 (CET)
  - Summer (DST): UTC+2 (CEST)
- Website: Official website

Almegíjar is a Spanish village and municipality located in the province of Granada, Andalusia. According to the 2005 census (INE), it has a population of 435 inhabitants.

== Overview ==
It is situated at over 800 metres above sea level, on the southern slopes of the Sierra Morena, a spur of Mulhacen, the highest mountain in Spain. Before the Spanish Civil War in 1935, the church was burned by anarchists and during the war it was just behind the republican front lines; the remains of trenches can still be seen up the mountain. These trenches represents the furthest advance of the Fascists into Las Alpujarras after they took Granada.

The people of the village still largely work on the land, often using mules. There are many olive groves (and an olive oil processing factory), almonds, oranges and lemons, along with vegetable gardens.

== See also ==
- Alpujarras
- Sierra Nevada
- List of municipalities in Granada
