= Sorvilán =

Coordinates: 36°48′N 3°16′W

- Flag Coat of arms

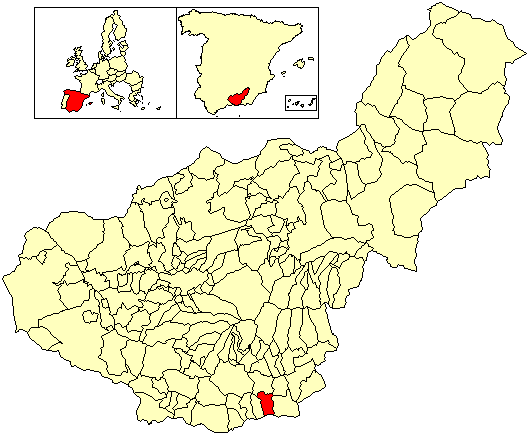

- Location in Spain.
- Country: Spain
- Province: Granada

Area
  - Total: 34.33 km^{2} (13.25 sq mi)
- Elevation: 760 m (2,490 ft)

Population (2025-01-01)
  - Total: 521
  - Density: 15.2/km^{2} (39.3/sq mi)
- Time zone: UTC+1 (CET)
  - Summer (DST): UTC+2 (CEST)
- Website: www.sorvilan.es

Sorvilán is a municipality in the province of Granada, Spain. As of 2010, it has a population of 614 inhabitants.

== See also ==
- List of municipalities in Granada
