= Murtas =

- city
- Coat of arms

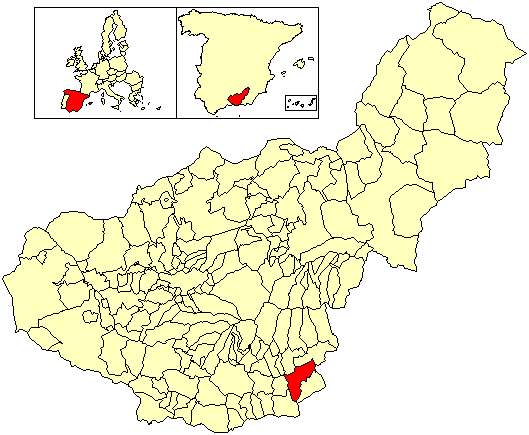
- Location of Murtas
- Coordinates: 36°53′N 3°06′W
- Country: Spain
- Province: Granada
- Municipality: Murtas

Area
  - Total: 72 km^{2} (28 sq mi)
- Elevation: 1 m (3.3 ft)

Population (2025-01-01)
  - Total: 431
  - Density: 6.0/km^{2} (16/sq mi)
- Time zone: UTC+1 (CET)
  - Summer (DST): UTC+2 (CEST)

Murtas is a municipality located in the province of Granada, Spain. Spanning an area of 71.7 km^{2}, according to the 2016 census (INE), the city has a population of 495 inhabitants. In 2005 the population was recorded as 741.

== See also ==
- List of municipalities in Granada
