= Soportújar =

Soportújar, Spain
- city
- Flag Coat of arms

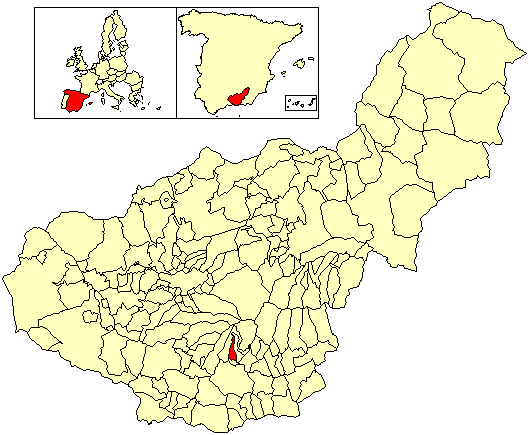
- Location of Soportújar
- Coordinates: 36°55′N 3°24′W
- Country: Spain
- Province: Granada
- Municipality: Soportújar

Area
  - Total: 14.16 km^{2} (5.47 sq mi)
- Elevation: 940 m (3,080 ft)

Population (2025-01-01)
  - Total: 260
  - Density: 18/km^{2} (48/sq mi)
- Time zone: UTC+1 (CET)
  - Summer (DST): UTC+2 (CEST)

Soportújar is a municipality located in the province of Granada, Spain. According to the 2015 census (INE), the city has a population of 296 inhabitants.

== See also ==
- List of municipalities in Granada
