= Lobras =

Lobras, Spain
- city
- Flag Coat of arms

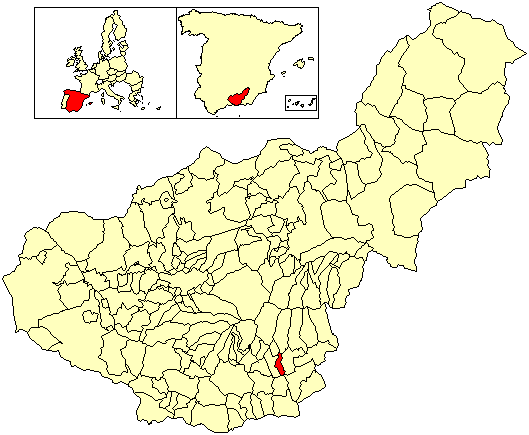
- Location of Lobras
- Coordinates: 36°56′N 3°12′W
- Country: Spain
- Province: Granada
- Municipality: Lobras

Area
  - Total: 16 km^{2} (6.2 sq mi)
- Elevation: 930 m (3,050 ft)

Population (2025-01-01)
  - Total: 139
  - Density: 8.7/km^{2} (23/sq mi)
- Time zone: UTC+1 (CET)
  - Summer (DST): UTC+2 (CEST)

Lobras is a municipality located in the province of Granada, Spain. According to the 2005 census (INE), the city has a population of 126 inhabitants.

== See also ==
- List of municipalities in Granada
