= Jete, Granada =

Jete
- city
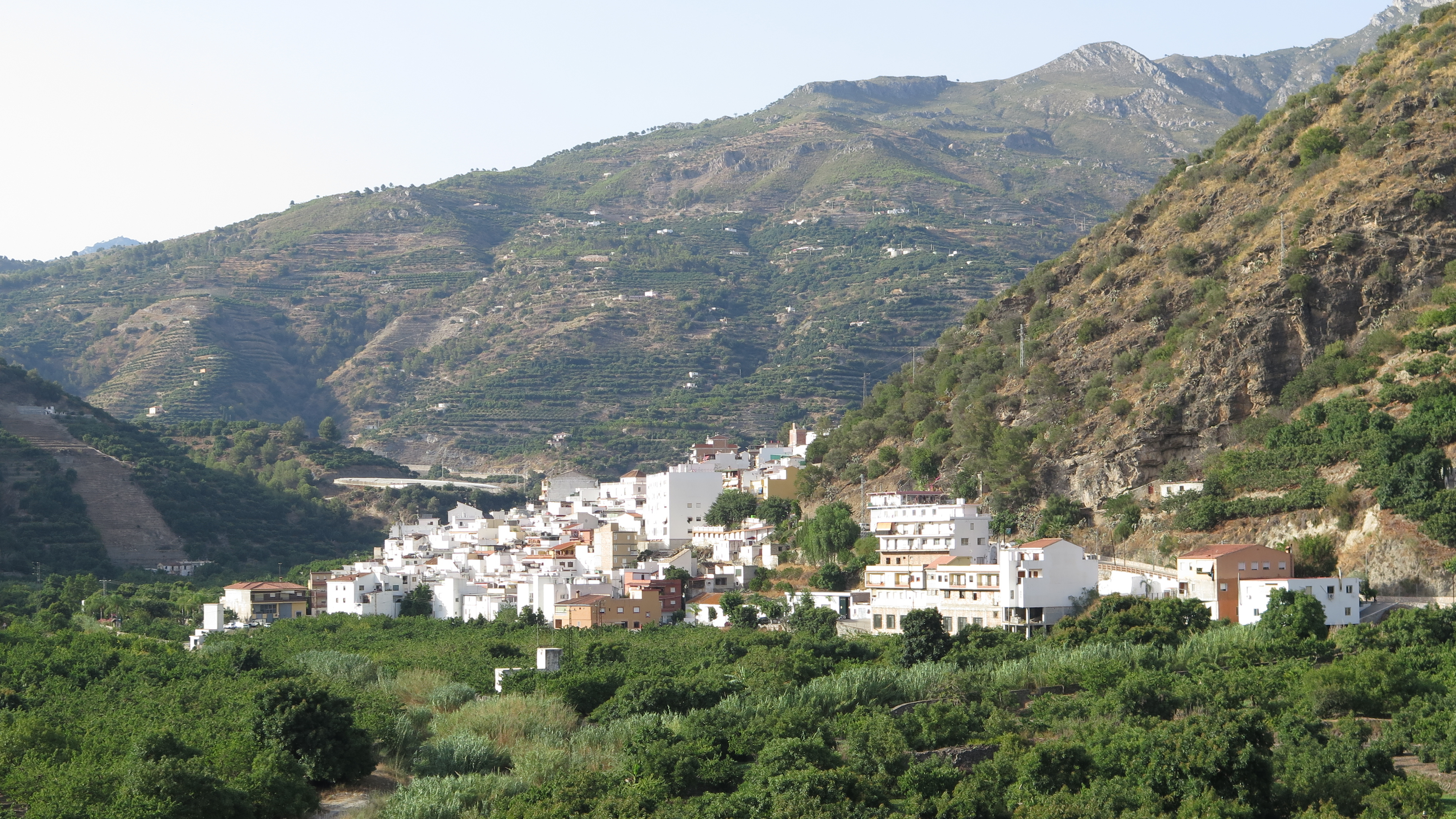

- Flag Coat of arms

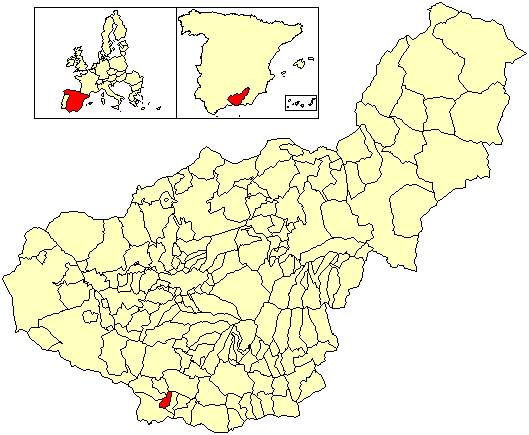
- Location of Jete
- Coordinates: 36.7964°N 3.66806°W
- Country: Spain
- Province: Granada
- Municipality: Jete

Area
  - Total: 13 km^{2} (5.0 sq mi)

Population (2025-01-01)
  - Total: 990
  - Density: 76/km^{2} (200/sq mi)
- Time zone: UTC+1 (CET)
  - Summer (DST): UTC+2 (CEST)

Jete is a municipality located in the province of Granada, Spain. According to the 2004 census (INE), the city has a population of 768 inhabitants.

== See also ==
- List of municipalities in Granada
