= Albondón =

Coordinates: 36°49′N 3°12′W

Albondón, Spain
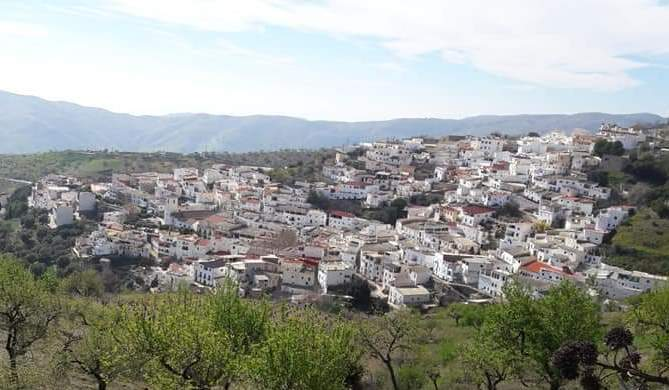

- Coat of arms

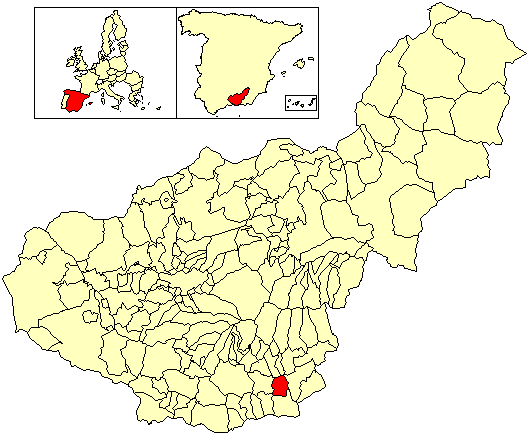
- Location of Albondón
- Country: Spain
- Province: Granada
- Municipality: Albondón

Area
  - Total: 35 km^{2} (14 sq mi)
- Elevation: 895 m (2,936 ft)

Population (2025-01-01)
  - Total: 703
  - Density: 20/km^{2} (52/sq mi)
- Time zone: UTC+1 (CET)
  - Summer (DST): UTC+2 (CEST)
- Website: www.albondon.es

Albondón is a village located in the province of Granada, Spain. According to the 2005 census (INE), the city has a population of 929 inhabitants.

== See also ==
- List of municipalities in Granada
