= Cástaras =

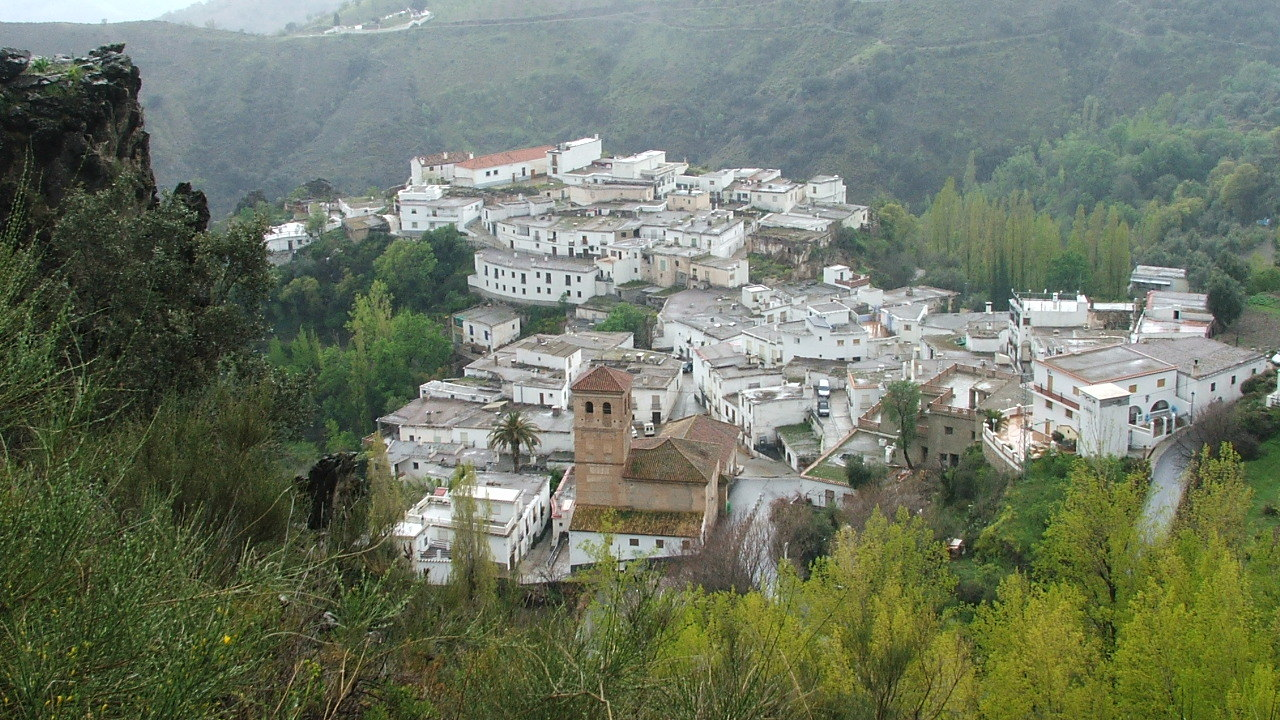
- A view of Cástaras (2011)

- Coat of arms

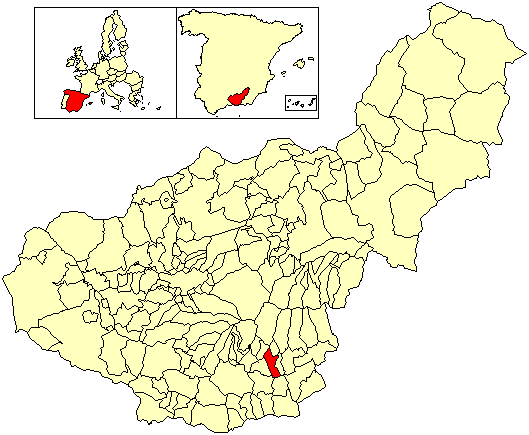
- Location of Cástaras
- Coordinates: 36°56′N 3°15′W
- Country: Spain
- Province: Granada
- Municipality: Cástaras

Area
  - Total: 28 km^{2} (11 sq mi)
- Elevation: 1.011 m (3.32 ft)

Population (2025-01-01)
  - Total: 178
  - Density: 6.4/km^{2} (16/sq mi)
- Time zone: UTC+1 (CET)
  - Summer (DST): UTC+2 (CEST)

Cástaras is a municipality located in the province of Granada, Spain. According to the 2005 census (INE), the city has a population of 251 inhabitants.

== See also ==
- List of municipalities in Granada
