= Torvizcón =

Torvizcón, Spain
- village
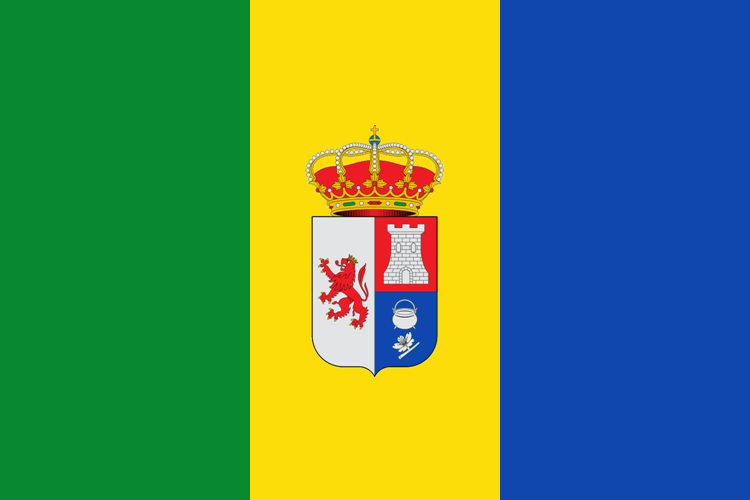
- Flag Coat of arms

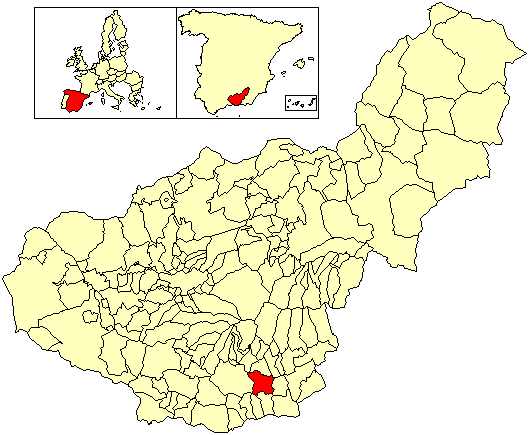
- Location of Torvizcón
- Coordinates: 36°53′N 3°18′W
- Country: Spain
- Province: Granada
- Municipality: Torvizcón

Area
  - Total: 51 km^{2} (20 sq mi)
- Elevation: 685 m (2,247 ft)

Population (2025-01-01)
  - Total: 608
  - Density: 12/km^{2} (31/sq mi)
- Time zone: UTC+1 (CET)
  - Summer (DST): UTC+2 (CEST)

Torvizcón is a municipality located in the province of Granada, Spain. According to the 2005 census (INE), the village has a population of 795 inhabitants.

== See also ==
- List of municipalities in Granada
