= Guadahortuna =

- Municipality
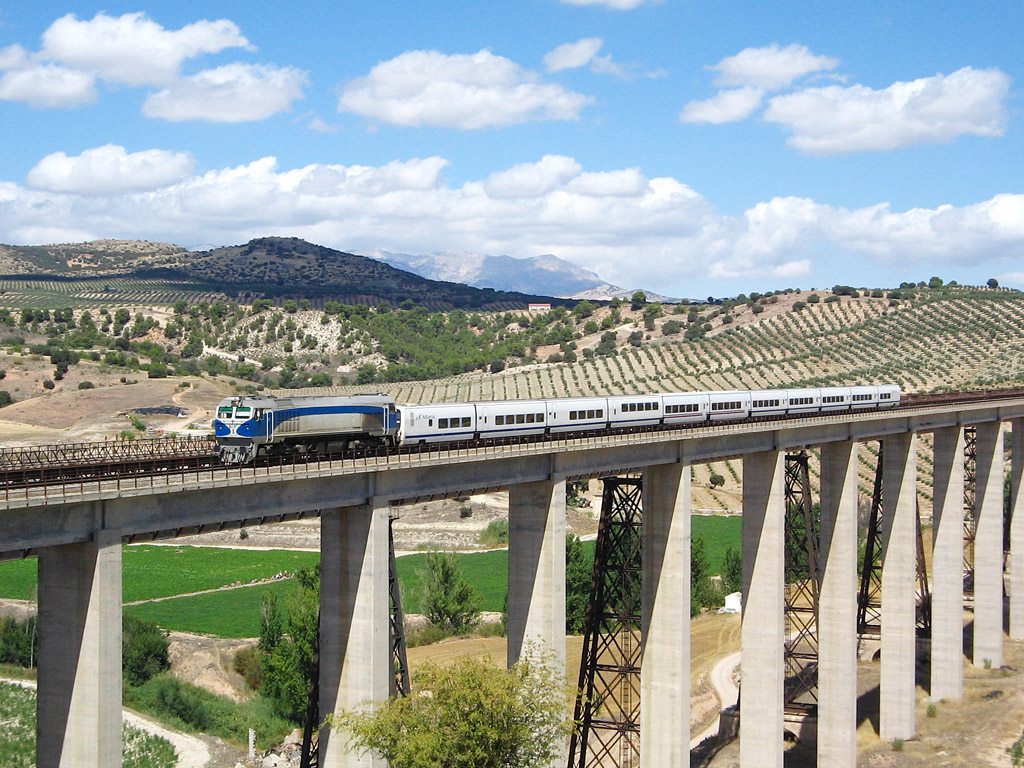

- Flag Coat of arms
- Motto(s): "Encrucijada de caminos" (Spanish for, "A cross of paths")
- Interactive map of Guadahortuna
- Coordinates: 37°33′29″N 3°23′57″W
- Country: Spain
- Autonomous Community: Andalusia
- Province: Granada
- Comarca: Los Montes

Government
  - Mayor: Juan José García Maza (IU)

Area
  - Total: 121.24 km^{2} (46.81 sq mi)
- Elevation (AMSL): 952 m (3,123 ft)

Population (2025-01-01)
  - Total: 1,829
  - Density: 15.09/km^{2} (39.07/sq mi)
- Time zone: UTC+1 (CET)
  - Summer (DST): UTC+2 (CEST)
- Postal code: 18560
- Area code: +34 (Spain) + (Granada)
- Website: Official website

Guadahortuna is a municipality of the province of Granada, in the autonomous community of Andalusia, Spain.

== History ==
Guadahortuna has been populated since prehistoric times.

During Moorish Al-Andalus the municipality got its name, which means "River of fortune". During this period of time, it served as a border zone where Christian troops would enter Moorish territory in order to harass its inhabitants.

In 1486, after the Christian victory over the Moors, queen Isabella I of Castile repopulated the municipality with Christians.

In 1492, Guadahortuna became part of the city of Granada until 1557, when the municipality bought its independence with money from all its inhabitants.

== Geography ==
Guadahortuna is bounded by the province of Jaén to the north, the municipality Alamedilla to the east, the municipalities Torre-Cardela and Píñar to the south and the municipalities Montejícar and Iznalloz to the west.

Guadahortuna is located on the Northeast of the province of Granada. Its highest mountain is Torrecilla's Hill with a height of 1,227 metres. It is located in the area known as La Atalaya. Other important mountains are Altos del Navazuelo, Vergara, Arrieros' Hill and Vertientes' Hill.

The municipality is located in Guadahortuna's valley.

Guadahortuna's river has its source in Montejícar. It passes through Montejícar, Guadahortuna, Alamedilla, Alicún de Ortega, Dehesas de Guadix and eventually it flows into Guadiana Menor river. From its source to its mouth, it travels 52 km.

== See also ==
- List of municipalities in Granada
