= Los Montes =

Comarca de Los Montes
- Comarca
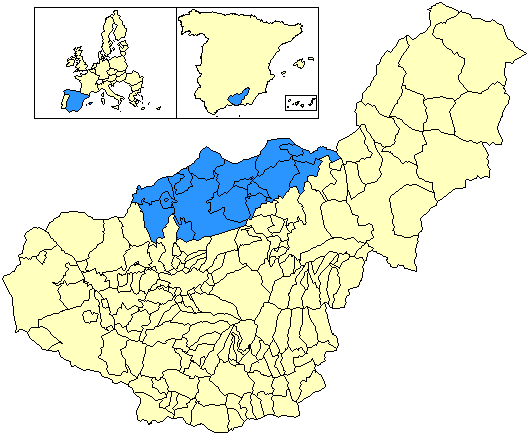
- Location of Los Montes in the province of Granada, Andalusia, Spain
- Coordinates: 37°28′56″N 3°25′50″W
- Country: Spain
- Autonomous community: Andalusia
- Province: Granada

Area
  - Total: 1,381 km^{2} (533 sq mi)

Population (2024) (Note: Estimate at 1 January 2024: National Statistics Institute (Spain))
  - Total: 23,333
  - Density: 16.90/km^{2} (43.76/sq mi)

Los Montes is a Spanish comarca located in the northern part of the province of Granada, community of Andalusia, Spain. This territory limits with the Granada's counties of Baza in the northwest, Guadix in the east and south, Vega de Granada in the south, and Loja in the west, as well as with the Jaen counties of Sierra Sur de Jaén in the northwest, Sierra Mágina in the north, and Sierra de Cazorla in the northeast. This comarca was established in 2003 by the Government of Andalusia.

== Geography ==
In the eastern part of the region, the zone or sub-county of Montes Orientales is located. The sub-county of Montes Orientales is located in the northeast part, occupying around of 1,400 km^{2}, which extends from Fardes and Guadiana Menor rivers to Frailes river. Its main mountainous system, located in the east, is Sierra Arana, a double limestone anticlinal alignment of 30 km of length, with an average altitude of 1,200 m.a.s.l (metres above sea level), being its highest level the Cerro or Peñón de la Cruz, with 2,030 m.a.s.l.

It is subdivided into the sub-county of Iznalloz (district capital), in the transition zone with the western part, and the sub-county of Pedro Martínez, more to the eastward. It predominates a landscape dominated by the hills with traditional agriculture, with herbaceous mainly, together with the mountains and dome hills with natural and repopulated vegetation, although also cultivated (mostly towards the west, where a wide range of woody crops appear).

There are also some irrigated plains (Cubillas and Guadahortuna rivers). All the population centres of the region are located above from 630 m.a.s.l and 14 of them exceed 1,000. The average altitude is 942.2 m; being Villanueva de las Torres the one which has the lowest altitude (633 m) and Torre-Cardela (1,217 m) the one which has the highest one. In line with its relief and proximity to the sea, it has a humid continental climate, which presents elements of mediterranean influence similar to areas as the Levantine, together with others more typical from the central plateau. There are long and cold winters and, at the other end, equally long and hot summers. The rainfall is scarce (less than 600 I) of unequal distribution, descending from west to east: 700 mm/year in Iznalloz, 300 mm/year in Pedro Martínez. The average annual temperature is 15 °C, oscillating between 6 and 7 °C in January and the almost 26 °C of average in July.

== Municipalities ==
The Los Montes comarca contains the following municipalities:

Arms	Municipality	Area (km^{2})	Population (2024) (Note: Estimate at 1 January 2024: National Statistics Institute (Spain))	Density (/km^{2})
	Alamedilla	90.7	543	6.0
	Alicún de Ortega	22.8	454	19.9
	Benalúa de las Villas	21.7	1,021	47.1
	Campotéjar	35.8	1,245	34.8
	Colomera	112.0	1,278	11.4
	Dehesas de Guadix	57.0	383	6.7
	Dehesas Viejas	13.7	640	46.7
	Deifontes	40.5	2,622	64.7
	Domingo Pérez de Granada	48.9	824	16.9
	Gobernador	23.0	237	10.3
	Guadahortuna	121.2	1,830	15.1
	Iznalloz	247.6	5,154	20.8
	Montejícar	87.7	2,020	23.0
	Montillana	75.1	1,057	14.1
	Morelábor	38.6	587	15.2
	Pedro Martínez	136.9	1,147	8.3
	Píñar	125.7	1,060	8.4
	Torre-Cardela	15.2	712	46.8
	Villanueva de las Torres	66.9	519	7.8
	Total	1,381.0	23,333	16.9
