= Domingo Pérez de Granada =

- Municipality
- Flag Coat of arms

- Location in Spain
- Coordinates: 37°29′51″N 3°30′27″W
- Country: Spain
- Autonomous community: Andalusia
- Province: Granada
- Comarca: Los Montes
- Judicial district: Granada

Government
  - Alcalde: Eloy Vera (PSOE)

Area
  - Total: 50 km^{2} (19 sq mi)
- Elevation: 981 m (3,219 ft)

Population (2025-01-01)
  - Total: 822
  - Density: 16/km^{2} (43/sq mi)
- Demonym(s): Pereño, -ña
- Time zone: UTC+1 (CET)
  - Summer (DST): UTC+2 (CEST)
- Postal code: 18567
- Dialing code: +34 958

Domingo Pérez de Granada is a village and municipality of Granada province, Spain, placed at 46 kilometers from Granada.

This village has many accesses: in the north, Montejícar and others villages of Jaén as Huelma, Cambil, and Arbuniel; In the east way is near to Píñar; and south access the old road to Granada, that joins it to Píñar, Iznalloz and Deifontes.

== See also ==
- List of municipalities in Granada
