= Huelma =

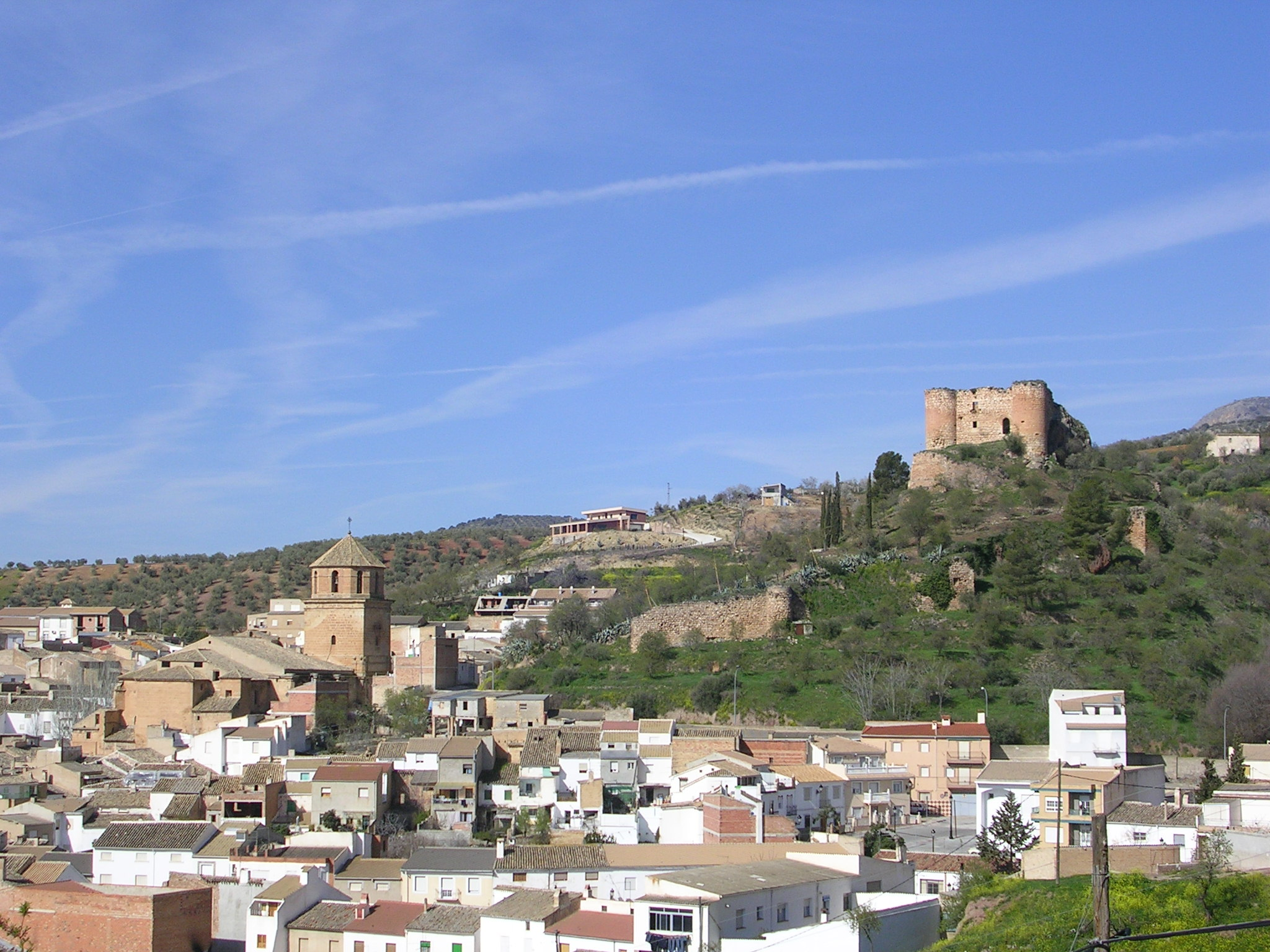

- Flag Coat of arms

- Location in the Province of Jaén Huelma (Andalusia) Huelma (Spain)
- Coordinates: 37°39′N 3°27′W
- Country: Spain
- Autonomous community: Andalusia
- Province: Jaén
- Municipality: Huelma

Area
  - Total: 250.29 km^{2} (96.64 sq mi)
- Elevation: 981 m (3,219 ft)

Population (2025-01-01)
  - Total: 5,485
  - Density: 21.91/km^{2} (56.76/sq mi)
- Time zone: UTC+1 (CET)
  - Summer (DST): UTC+2 (CEST)

Huelma is a city located in the province of Jaén, Spain. According to the 2010 census (INE), the city had a population of 6,208 inhabitants.

== Etymology ==
Its name dates from the 11th or 13th century Arabic Walda(t) al-ma a'water source'. One possible origin for the name Huelma is from Berber Guelma as in the Algerian homonymous city of Guelma.

== Nature ==
Huelma's municipality is located in the natural park of Parque natural de Sierra Mágina, situated in the Sierra Mágina mountain range. There are hiking trails to the Pico Mágina mountain and BTT tracks through the mountain. Geological sights like the Sierra Mágina karsts and the Cabeza Montosa guyot or tablemount are given.

== History ==
The Jandulilla river valley has been populated since ancient times, with Iberic remains found at the Cortijo del Pajarillo. After the Pacto de Jaén signed between King Ferdinand III of Castile and the Nasrid king Muhammad I of Granada, the area from Jódar to Montejícar castle became a frontier zone between both kingdoms for almost two centuries. Finally, in 1438 it was taken for Castile by Íñigo López de Mendoza, 1st Marquis of Santillana. Later, in 1463 Henry IV of Castile gave the manor and ownership of Huelma to Diego Fernández de la Cueva, 1st Viscount of Huelma. Both the Castle of the Viscounts of Huelma and the Inmaculada Concepción Church, built by architect Andrés de Vandelvira in the 16th century, were constructed in the Spanish Renaissance style. The Castle is in ruins since the 17th century, but the Church stands as Vandelvira's finest work.

During the 19th century the Spanish confiscation seized and sold the former Order of Saint Augustine Convent that once stood beside the town hall. The works of the geographic Diccionario geográfico-estadístico-histórico de España y sus posesiones de Ultramar describe Huelma during the 19th century and its XVII grid plan.

== Main sights ==
Five notable heritage sites in Huelma have been recognized as Bienes de Interés Cultural (BIC), including the 16th century Castle of Huelma, or Castle of the Duke of Alburquerque, the notable Renaissance church of Inmaculada Concepción, built by Andrés de Vandelvira, the 15th century Solera Castle in the village of Solera, which was renovated in 2006, the Iberian archeological site of Cortijo El Pajarillo (the archaeological findings are located in the Iberian Museum of Jaén), and Huelma's historic centre.

== Notable people ==
- Rafael Lopez Guzman, art history professor at the University of Granada
- Sebastián Martos, athlete

== See also ==
- Pico Mágina
- List of municipalities in Jaén
