= Sierra Mágina =

Massif in the province of Jaén, southern Spain

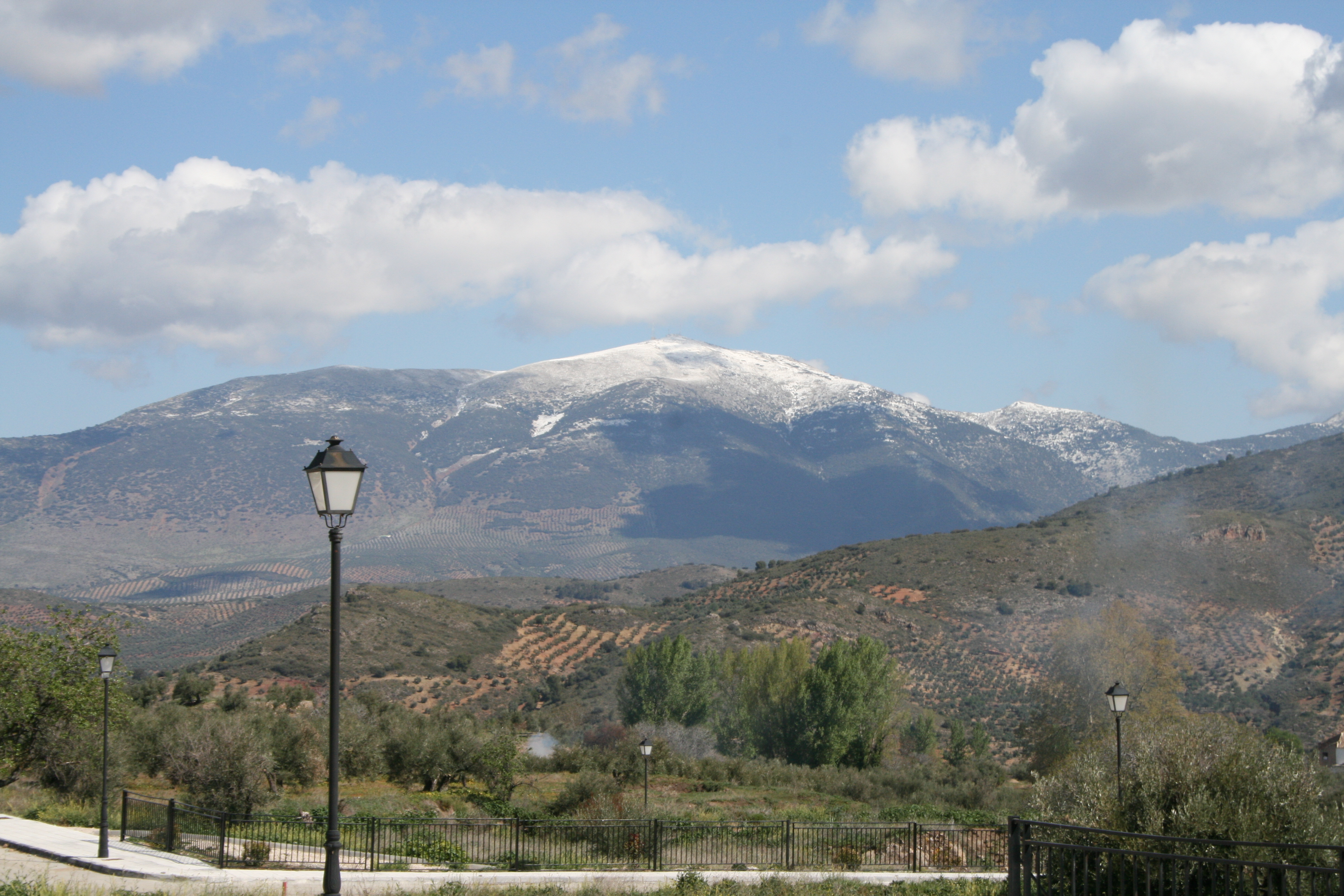
- The Pico Almadén, seen from Arbuniel

Highest point
- Peak: Pico Mágina
- Elevation: 2,167 m (7,110 ft)
- Coordinates: 37°43′N 3°28′W

Geography
- Location within Spain
- Location: Granada province and Jaén province Andalusia
- Parent range: Penibaetic System

Geology
- Mountain type: Limestone

The Sierra Mágina is a massif mostly in the province of Jaén (southern Spain), part of the Cordillera Subbética. The highest peak is the Pico Mágina, with an elevation of 2,164 m.

== Geography ==
The boundaries of the massif are grossly defined by the Guadalquivir valley from the north, the Guadiana Menor from east, and Guadahortuna from south and the Guadalbullón from south.

== Protected area ==
Most of the chain is included in a natural park, the Parque Natural de Sierra Mágina.

The range can be reached from Albanchez de Mágina, Bedmar, Belmez de la Moraleda, Cambil, Huelma, Jimena, Jódar, Mancha Real, Pegalajar or Torres

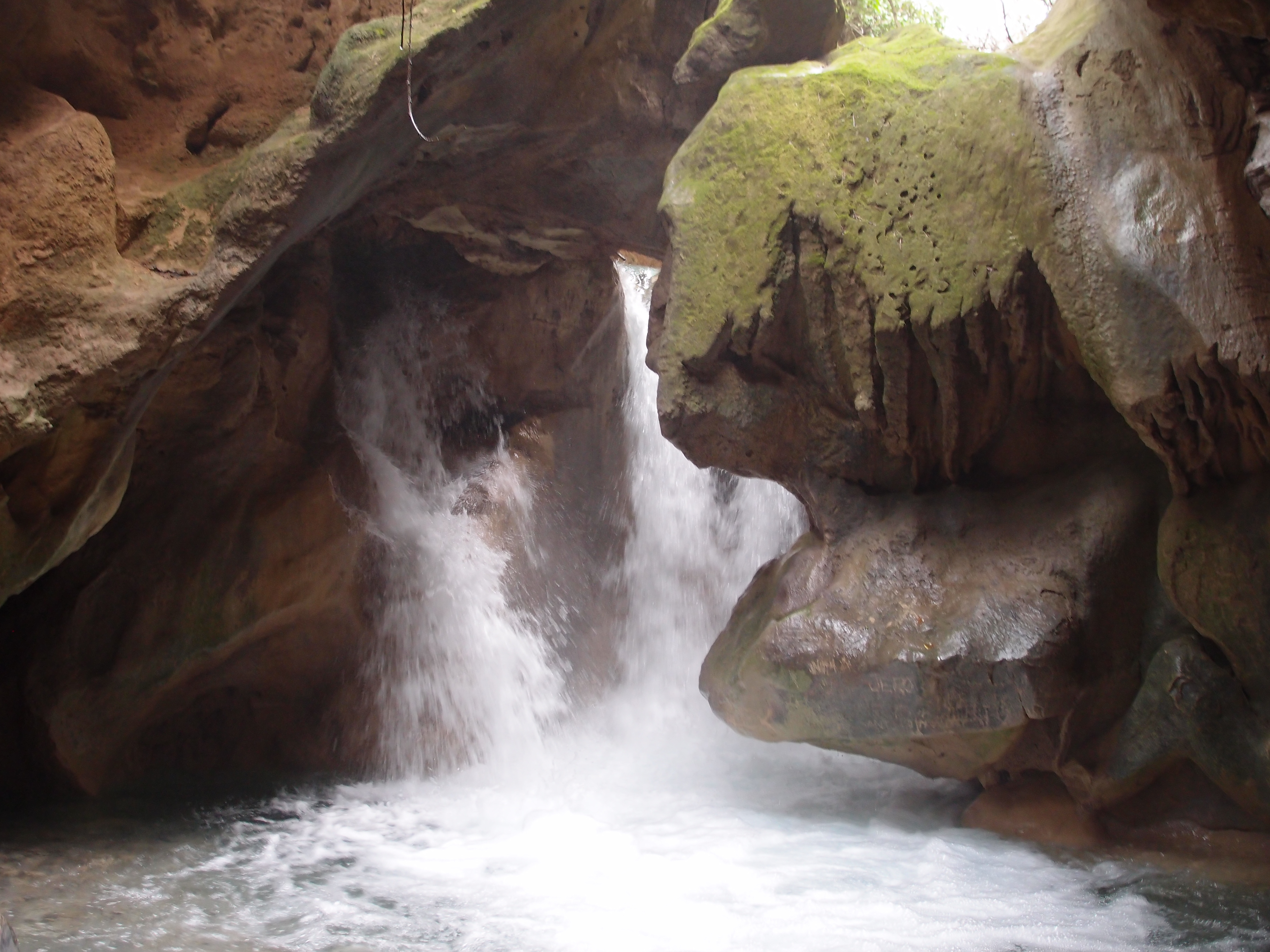
Cascade on the Rio Cuadros in the park

== See also ==
- Baetic System
- Sierra Mágina Comarca
