= NO8DO =

Motto and logotype of Seville, Spain

Flag of Seville, adopted in 1995, bearing the NO8DO device in gold on crimson

NO8DO (also rendered NO&DO) is the motto and logotype of the city of Seville, Spain, found on countless buildings, street signs, manhole covers and municipal property throughout the city. The device consists of the syllables NO and DO flanking a figure resembling the numeral 8, conventionally identified as a skein of wool (Spanish: madeja). Read as a rebus, "No-madeja-do" puns on No me ha dejado ("it [she] has not abandoned me"), a phrase traditionally explained by the loyalty Seville showed to Alfonso X of Castile during the revolt of his son Sancho in the late 13th century. Modern scholarship, however, has rejected both the medieval dating and the Alfonsine origin of the emblem, tracing it instead to the 15th-century municipal works of the Villafranca family and, possibly, to the Latin incipit In Nomine Domini ("in the name of the Lord"), with the central figure read not as a skein but as a knot (Latin: nodus).

The NO8DO is considered the "lesser arms" (armas menores) of the city; the "greater arms" are the coat of arms of Seville, which depicts King Ferdinand III of Castile enthroned between the bishops Saint Isidore and Saint Leander. Originally an auxiliary emblem subordinate to the coat of arms, the NO8DO had become the city's principal symbol in practice by the end of the 20th century, and since 2003 a modernised version, designed by the graphic designer Antonio Jiménez, has served as the corporate logo of the city council.

== The coat of arms and the flag ==
The coat of arms of Seville, the city's "greater arms"

The coat of arms of Seville represents Ferdinand III, the "Saint King" who conquered the city in 1248, bearing an orb and a sword and flanked by the Visigothic-era bishops Isidore and Leander, patrons of the city. The arrangement was already described as the city's seal and arms by Alonso Morgado in his Historia de Sevilla (1587).

Seville long lacked a flag in the modern sense. Its traditional standard was the city banner, an embroidered crimson standard depicting the enthroned Saint Ferdinand bordered by the castles and lions of Castile and León, reserved for the most solemn occasions of the municipal corporation. Its elaborate design made reproduction difficult; through the 19th century the absence of a civic flag was supplied by the flag of Spain or, when the city itself had to be represented, by tapestries and hangings, and after the Transition a painted copy of the banner was hung from the town hall balcony in lieu of a flag. The formal process began in 1989, when the municipal head of protocol, Mauricio Domínguez-Adame, produced a report on the history and uses of the banner, arguing that its existence did not make up for the lack of a flag and noting numerous requests that Seville adopt one.

The present flag was authorised by decree 69/1995 of 14 March (published in the BOJA on 18 March 1995): a rectangle of 2:3 proportion, crimson red, with the NO8DO device in yellow at the centre. The procedure was completed with some haste so that the flag would be ready for 18 March, when King Juan Carlos I, visiting Seville for the wedding of Infanta Elena in Seville Cathedral, gave his approval and made a symbolic presentation of the standard. The old banner survives, though it is reserved for occasions so solemn that it has fallen into practical disuse.

== Origin and meaning ==
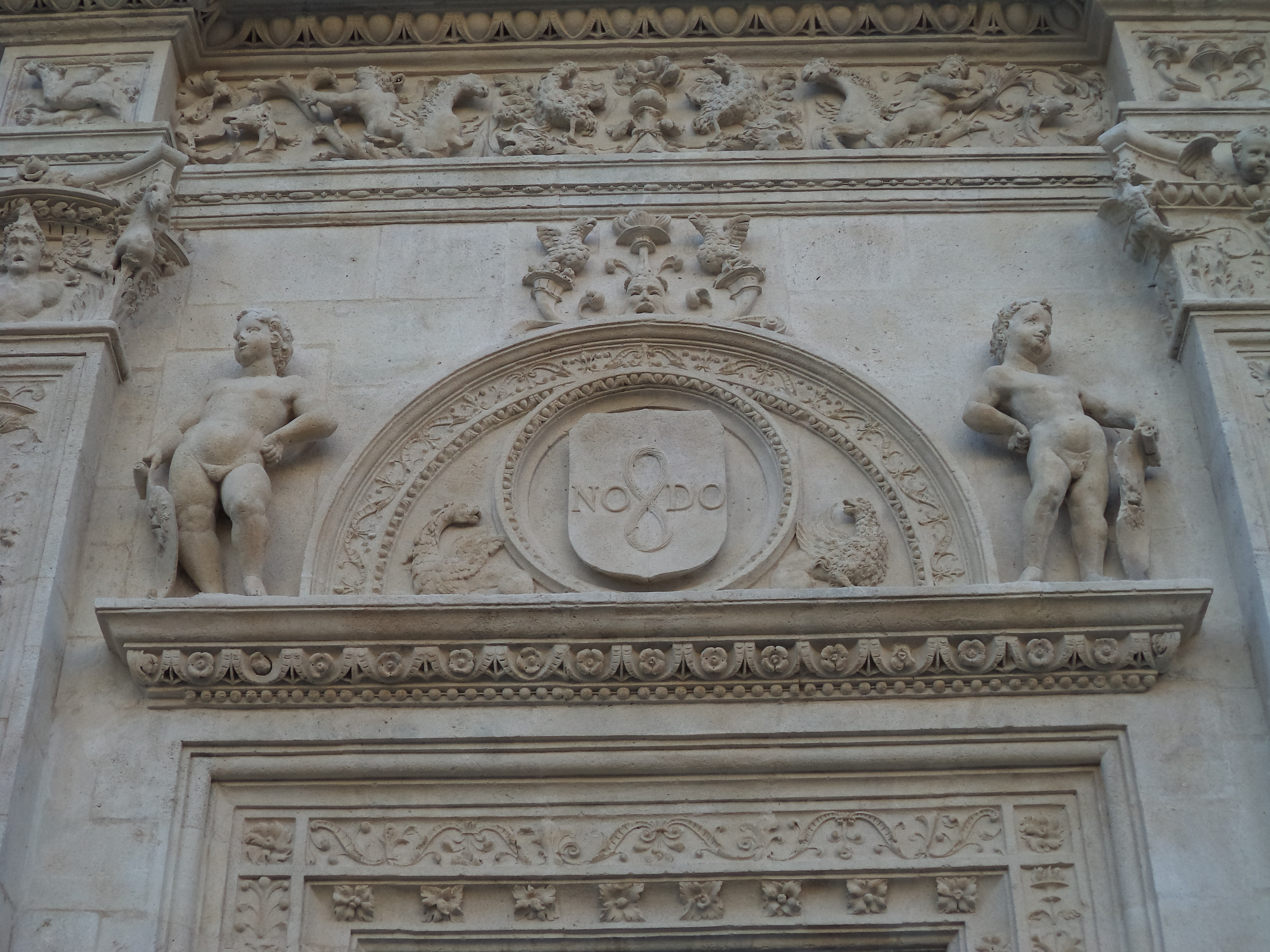
NO8DO relief on the town hall facade, Plaza de San Francisco

No written source explaining the emblem's meaning predates the 16th century, a silence which has fuelled competing interpretations and, in current scholarship, the conclusion that the device has neither a medieval origin nor any connection with Alfonso X.

=== Early written accounts ===
The earliest recorded explanation comes from Gonzalo Argote de Molina, who wrote in 1588 that, according to some, the council (cabildo) adopted the device to signify that its business should be conducted "not tangled" (no ... madexado) "but smooth and without skeins", an apology for good public administration. In the same manuscript, however, Argote corrected himself and became the first author to set down in writing the loyalist version: that when the Infante Sancho rebelled against Alfonso X and all the realms took his side, Seville alone remained loyal, for which the king gave the city as its device a skein between the four letters NO DO, so that, joining them to the name of the skein, it reads no me ha dexado. On the title page of the manuscript (a 1588 copy of the 13th-century Repartimiento de Sevilla, now in the Royal Palace of Madrid, and the oldest surviving copy of that text) Argote placed a representation of the NO8DO in a shield timbred with an open royal crown. The presence of the device on that title page has prompted the suggestion that the letters NO. DO. were in fact the incipit of the book itself, In Nomine Domini, an old manner of titling works.

Pablo Espinosa de los Monteros repeated the loyalist reading in 1630, writing that Alfonso, having found the city's gates open to him and been received and sustained there, confirmed Seville's privileges and gave it "as arms the skeins with the motto: Seville does not abandon me" (Sevilla no me dexa). The priest Fernando de la Torre Farfán described the emblem in 1671 as "the ancient symbol of its loyalty", a golden skein on a blue field between the letters NO. DO. in silver characters, whose cipher is No me ha dexado.

The historian Diego Ortiz de Zúñiga, in his Anales eclesiásticos y seculares (1671), gave the interpretation its canonical form: the device meant "it has not abandoned me" and was granted by Alfonso X to Seville in 1283, seven months before his death, together with the confirmation of all the city's privileges "for the great loyalty and true love" shown during Sancho's uprising. Yet Ortiz de Zúñiga himself recorded a decisive reservation: "I find in old memorials that the king gave this device and motto by the hand of a knight of the lineage of the Villafranca", acknowledging that the emblem was associated with that family rather than originating unambiguously with the king.

=== The In Nomine Domini hypothesis ===
According to the investigation published by the historian Emilio Carrillo in El NO8DO de Sevilla: significado y origen (2005), the device may derive, as an incipit, from the opening syllables of In Nomine Domini. Such labara commonly display a cross or crucifix at the centre; here the central figure would be a species of knot, from the Latin nodo ("to knot") and nodus ("knot"), rather than a skein. Comparable Latin mottoes appear on the arms of other European cities from the Middle Ages, such as London's Domine dirige nos or In Dei Nomine, Amen at Vejer de la Frontera; the syllables NO-DO themselves occur on important religious buildings elsewhere in Europe, including the Giralda bell tower, where the phrase nomen Domini is found.

=== The Villafranca origin ===
The documentary trail, as investigated by Rafael Sánchez Saus, points to the emblem being originally a device of the Villafranca family. The symbol is first attested in the old city council building in the Corral de los Olmos, remodelled between 1436 and 1439; when the new town hall was built in the Plaza de San Francisco in the 16th century, the existing shields were simply copied from one building to the other. The device also appeared on repairs to the Caños de Carmona aqueduct and, tellingly, on the house of Francisco de Villafranca, who from July 1437 held for many years the office of obrero mayor, the official charged by the council with planning, contracting and supervising municipal works. He placed his arms and emblems on the works he executed in the city's name, including the culvert over the Tagarete stream, where an image of the Virgin stood, and the Corral de los Olmos reforms. Francisco de Villafranca came from a lineage long connected with the council; his family had carried great weight in the institutional life of the city for a century and a half. On this reading it was principally Ortiz de Zúñiga who propagated the Alfonsine legend, even while himself recording the Villafranca connection.

== The legend of loyalty to Alfonso X ==
The most widespread explanation, though not the historical one, refers to the city's loyalty to Alfonso X in his conflict with his son Sancho over the succession. Among the legal reforms of Alfonso's reign, the law of succession set out in the Siete Partidas provided that if the eldest son predeceased the king leaving children, those grandchildren would inherit, in place of the traditional passage to the next surviving son. When the heir, Infante Ferdinand de la Cerda, died in 1275, Alfonso's heir under the new rule would have been his grandson Alfonso de la Cerda, but Sancho, the king's second son, claimed his rights under the older custom. Supported by the king's wife, Violant of Aragon, Sancho rose in arms against his father, winning cities to his cause in which Alfonso was declared deposed. Sancho even invoked his father's illness (a growing tumour of the jaw that caused the king disfiguring pain, the loss of an eye, and violent changes of temper) as grounds for removing him from power, alleging leprosy. Alfonso died in Seville in 1284, leaving in his will his repudiation of Sancho, who nonetheless reigned as Sancho IV of Castile. This episode was used to justify the origin of the NO8DO, which is now known to have nothing to do with Alfonso X.

== Historical reproductions ==
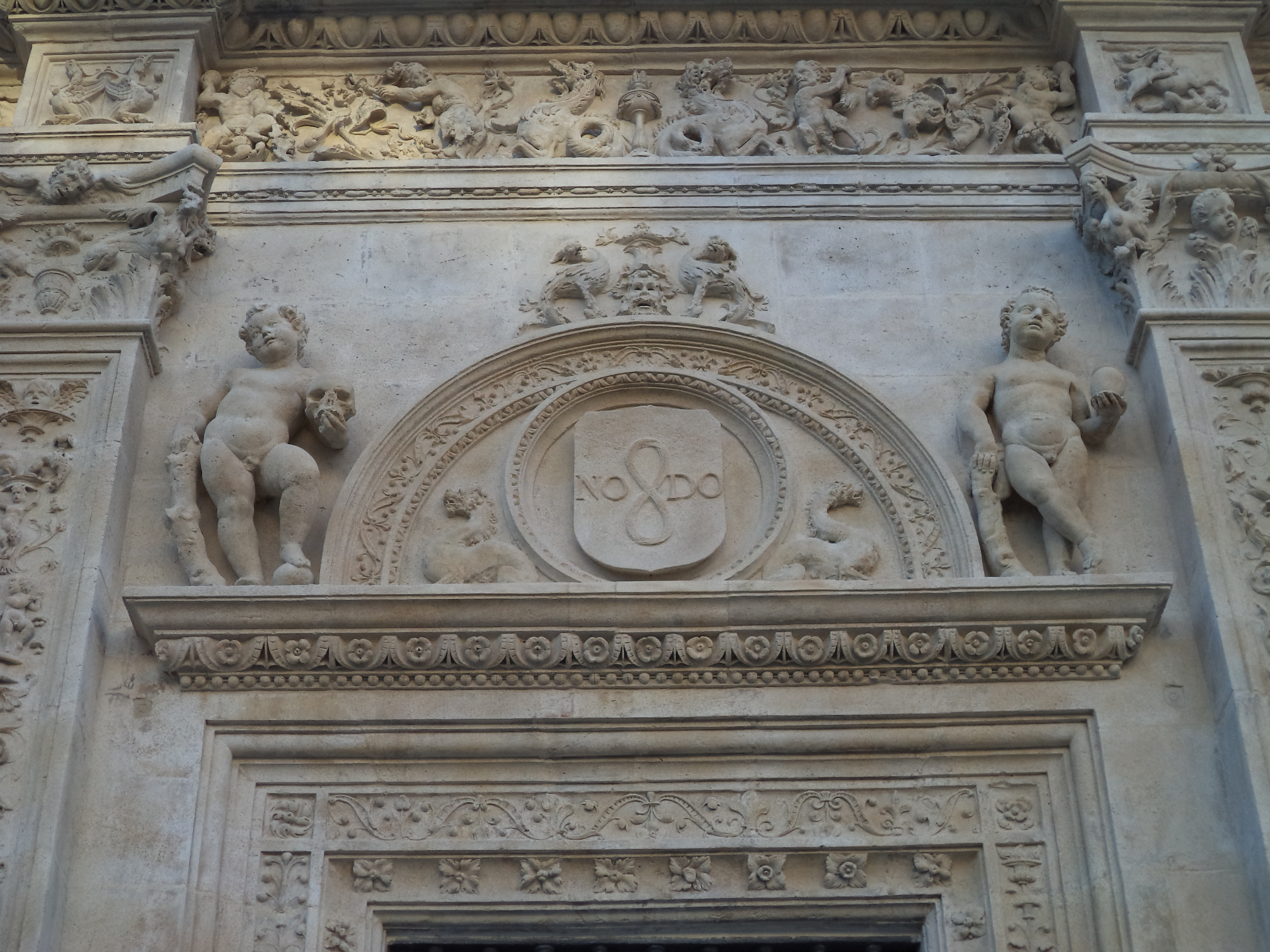
One of the NO8DO reliefs on the town hall, flanked by putti bearing skulls and a trunk

The oldest known reproduction stood in the old council building in the Corral de los Olmos, placed there during the ambitious reforms of 1437–1439 and copied into the new town hall when the corporation moved in the 16th century. A second early reproduction accompanied the image of the Virgin on the Caños de Carmona aqueduct where it crossed the Tagarete; Argote de Molina noted that the device could be seen "in the old council house of Seville, and on the image they call Our Lady of the Skeins" (Nuestra Señora de las Madexas). In the 18th century Cristóbal Ramos carved a Virgin for the niche; profaned in the Revolution of 1868, the image was taken by the faithful to the church of San Roque, where it remained until the church burned in 1936. In 1993 a commemorative azulejo of the Virgin was placed on the surviving arcade of the aqueduct, and a modern copy exists in San Roque.

Through Francisco de Medina and Ortiz de Zúñiga it is known that the device also appeared on a central fortified tower built in 1451 by Francisco de Villafranca, which passed to the counts of Villafranca, then to the counts of Saavedra and the Martel family, and finally to the Castelar line. The tower, which had survived the edict of the Catholic Monarchs prohibiting private fortifications, was demolished by the French in 1811 during the occupation of the city, and the Encarnación market was built on the site. Medina wrote of Villafranca's works on the bridge by the Caños de Carmona that "there he placed the skein and the letters, the device and his arms".

In the present town hall, two cartouches with the NO8DO, flanked by sculptural groups of the Calvary and the sacrifice of Isaac, were executed with the construction of the building around 1533–1534 in the frieze of the lower chapter hall; the reproductions on the facade facing the carriage entrance date from around 1788.

== Alfonso XIII's speech of 1926 ==
In the 1920s King Alfonso XIII took a close interest in Seville's preparations for the Ibero-American Exposition of 1929. On 7 April 1926, after a banquet in the completed Royal Pavilion and during a celebration in the adjoining Plaza de América, he closed a speech on the future exposition with the words: "Tell the Sevillians that if one King Alfonso gave Seville the honour of placing on its shield the phrase 'It has not abandoned me', another King Alfonso says that he will never abandon the Sevillians."

== Sources ==
- Antequera Luengo, Juan José (2008). Símbolos oficiales de Sevilla y su Diputación provincial. Vexilología-sigilografía-heráldica [Official symbols of Seville and its Provincial Council: vexillology, sigillography and heraldry] (in Spanish). Seville: Facediciones. ISBN 978-84-9986-187-6.
- Braojos Garrido, Alfonso (1992). Alfonso XIII y la Exposición Iberoamericana de Sevilla de 1929 [Alfonso XIII and the 1929 Ibero-American Exposition of Seville] (in Spanish). Seville: Secretariado de Publicaciones, Universidad de Sevilla. ISBN 84-7405-960-7. OL 1196057M.
- Carrillo Benito, Emilio (2005). El NO8DO de Sevilla: significado y origen [Seville's NO8DO: meaning and origin] (in Spanish). Seville: RD Editores.
- De Mena, José María (1987). Tradiciones y leyendas sevillanas [Traditions and legends of Seville] (in Spanish) (2nd ed.). Esplugues de Llobregat: Plaza & Janés.
- Sánchez Saus, Rafael (1998). "Origen, creación y fortuna de la divisa NO8DO en Sevilla" [Origin, creation and fortunes of the NO8DO device in Seville] (PDF). Emblemata: Revista Aragonesa de Emblemática (in Spanish) (4): 99–124. ISSN 1137-1056.
