= Antonio Valero =

Antonio Valero is the name of:

- Antonio Valero (actor) (born 1955), Spanish actor
- Antonio Valero (footballer, born 1931), Spanish footballer
- Antonio Valero (footballer, born 1971), Spanish footballer
- Antonio Valero de Bernabé (1790–1863), Puerto Rican military leader
- Antonio Valero Vicente (1925–2001), Spanish engineer and academic, the first dean of IESE Business School
