= Torres, Jaén =

Torres
- Municipality
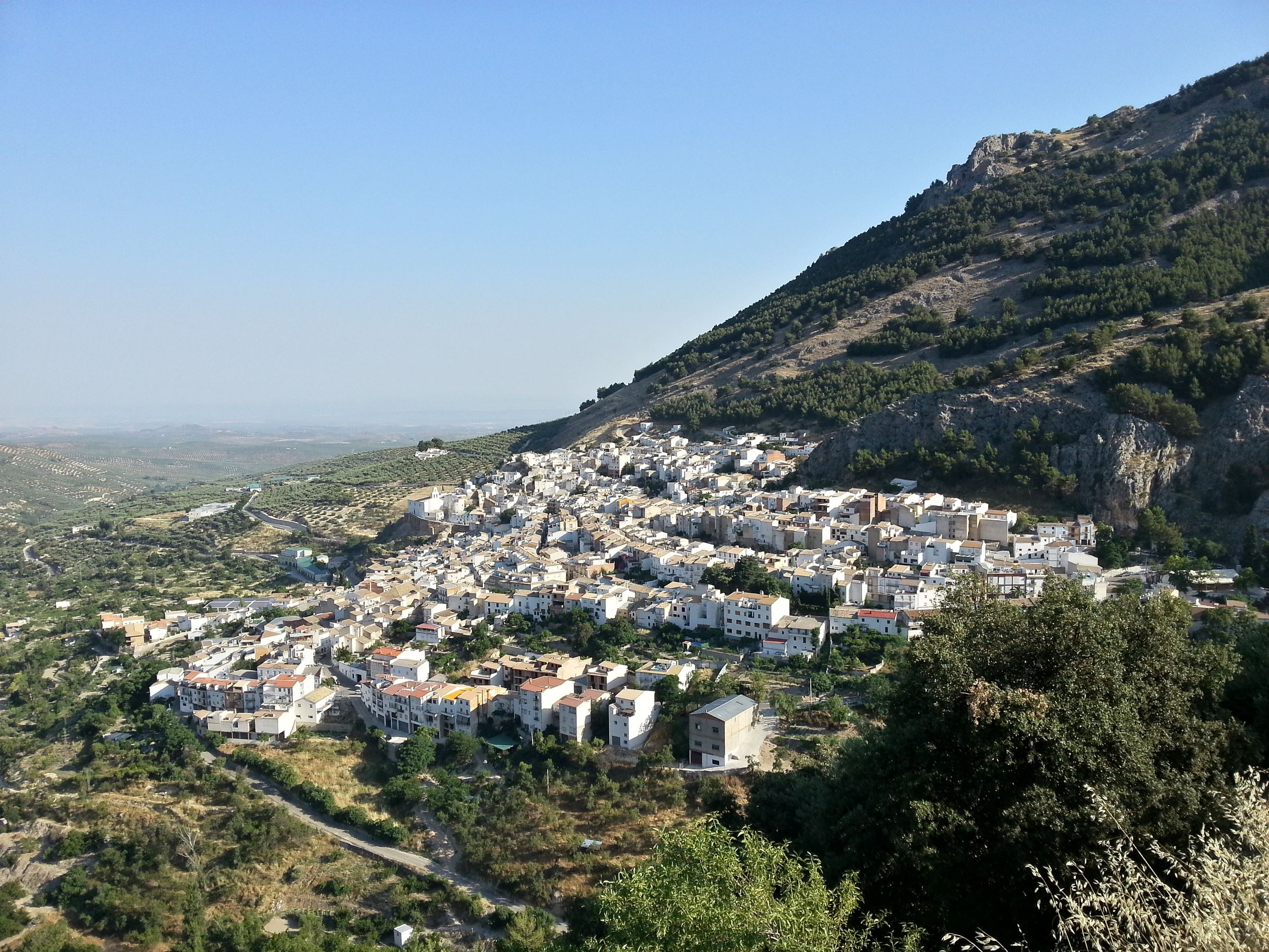

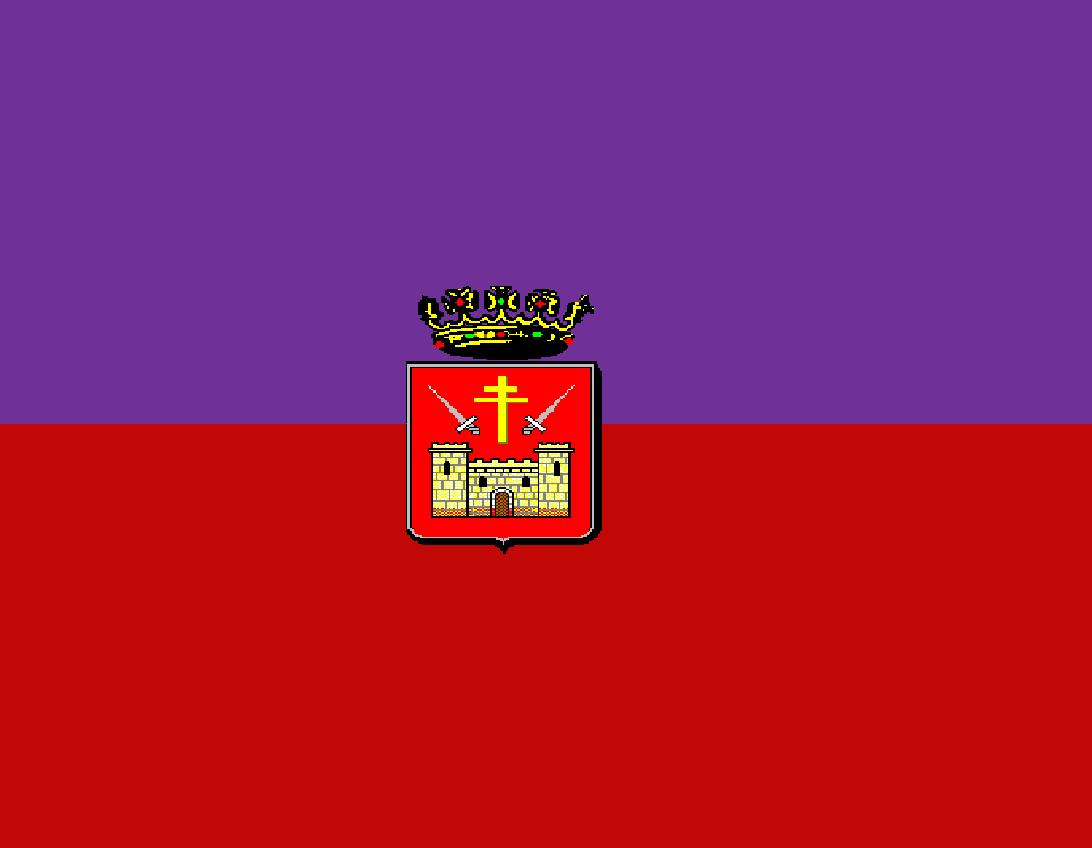
- Flag Coat of arms

- Location in the Province of Jaén Torres (Andalusia) Torres (Spain)
- Coordinates: 37°47′N 3°30′W
- Country: Spain
- Autonomous community: Andalusia
- Province: Jaén
- Comarca: Sierra Mágina

Area
  - Total: 80.04 km^{2} (30.90 sq mi)
- Elevation: 880 m (2,890 ft)

Population (2025-01-01)
  - Total: 1,328
  - Density: 16.59/km^{2} (42.97/sq mi)
- Time zone: UTC+1 (CET)
  - Summer (DST): UTC+2 (CEST)

Torres is a municipality in the province of Jaén, Spain. According to the 2015 census, the municipality has a population of 1,516 inhabitants.

== Economy ==
The economy of Torres is based on the agriculture, basically production of olive oil and cherries. It is also important the rural tourism, with some hotels in the area, the construction sector, and the repairing of agriculture machinery.

In the year 2012, more than 570,000 kg of cherries were collected in its municipality.

== Gallery ==
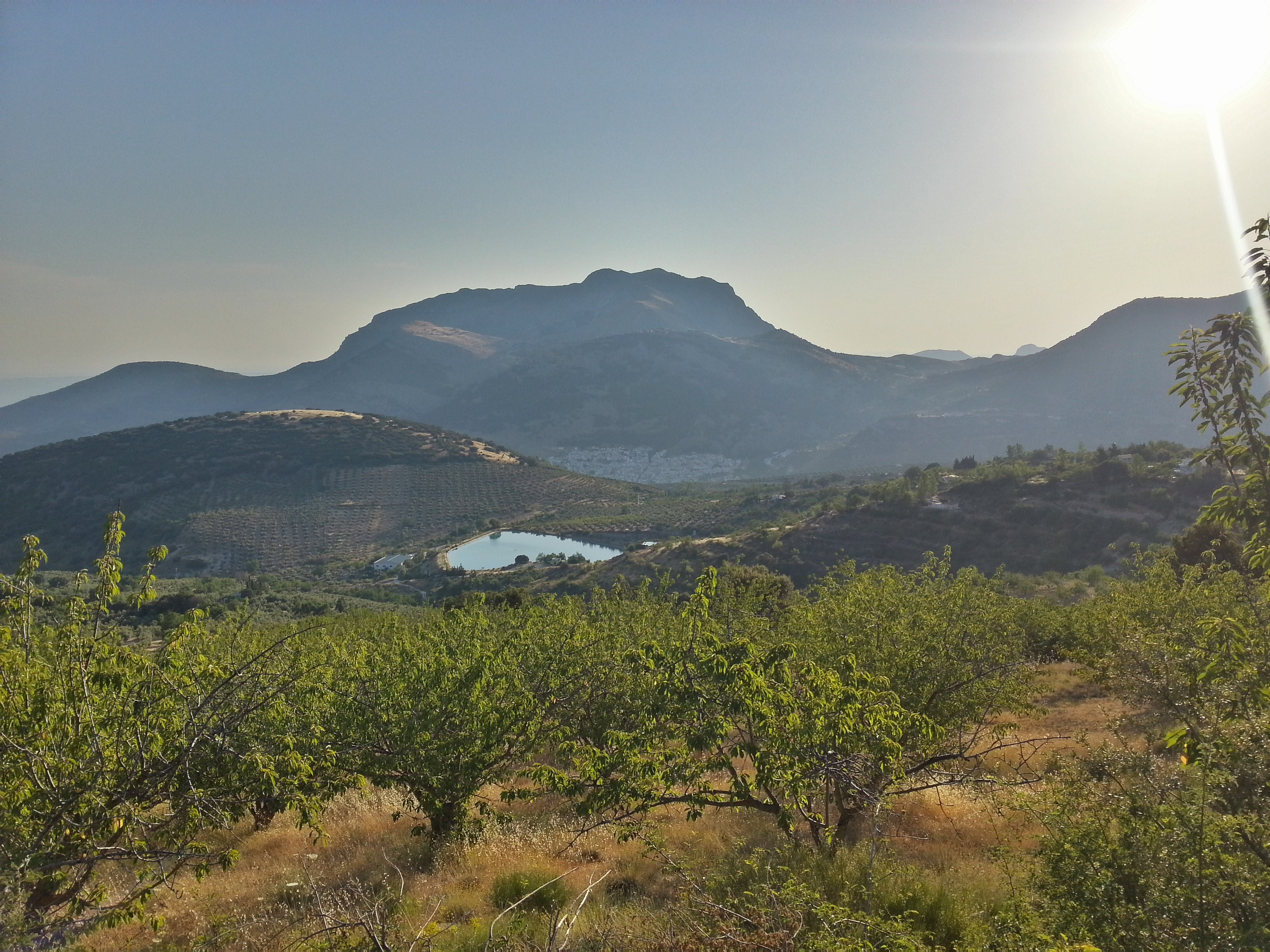
Cherry field. Torres at the bottom.

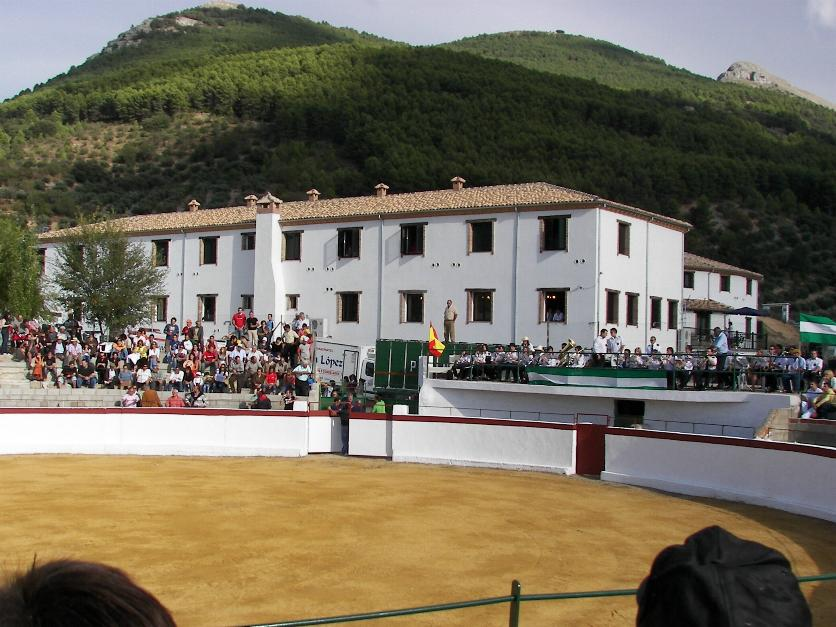
Bullfight ring.

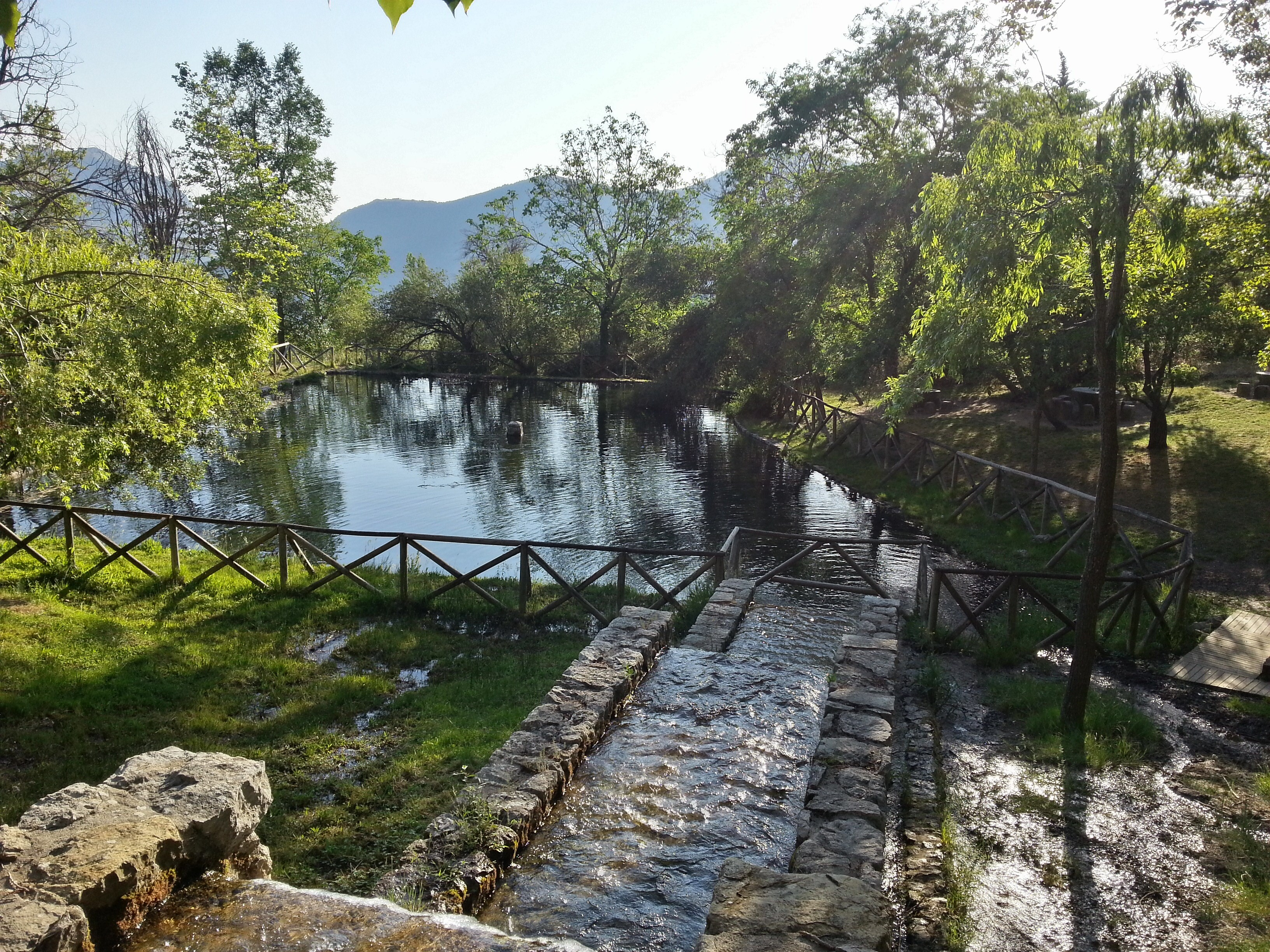
Recreational area Fuenmayor.

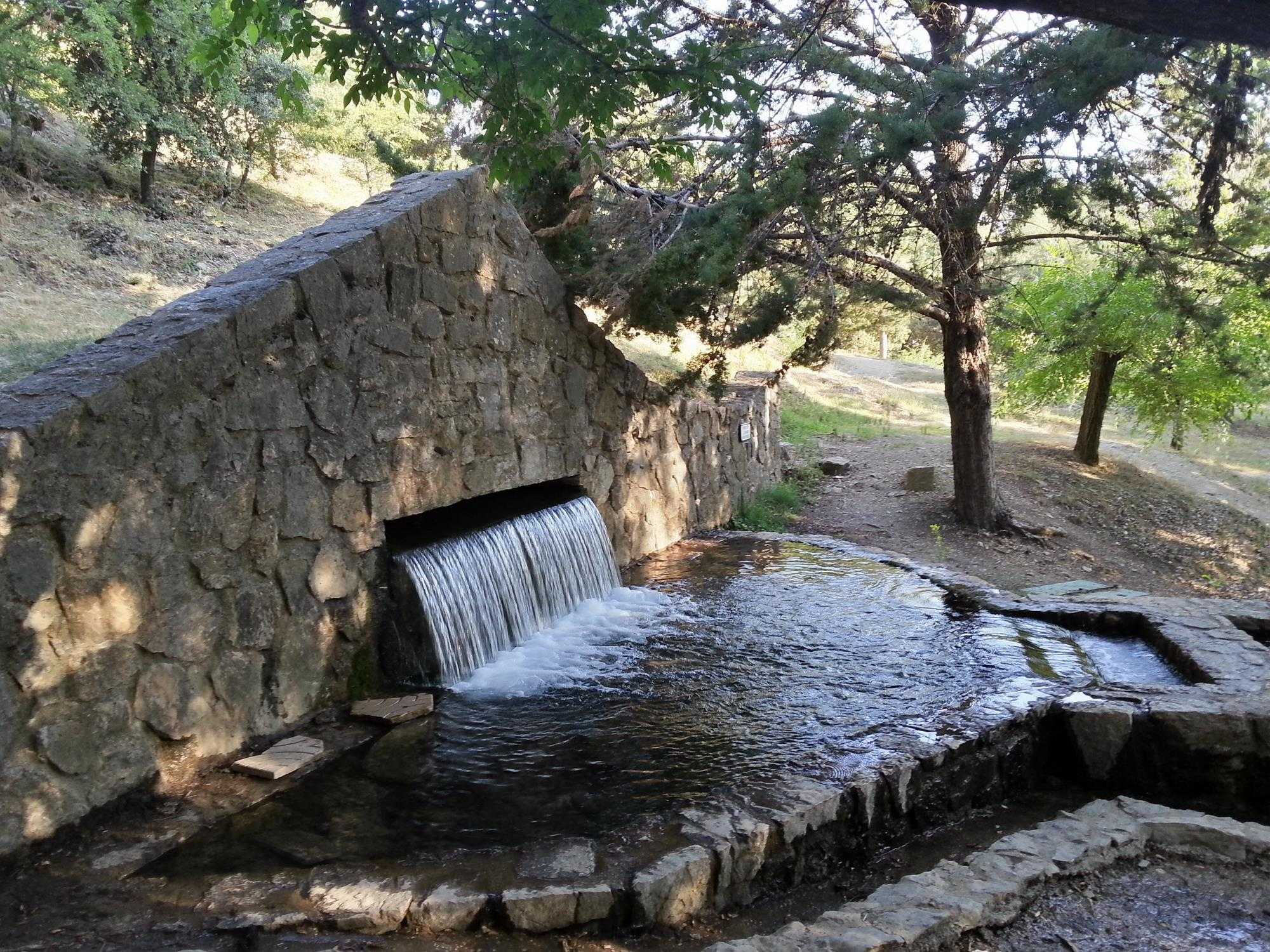
Fuenmayor Spring.

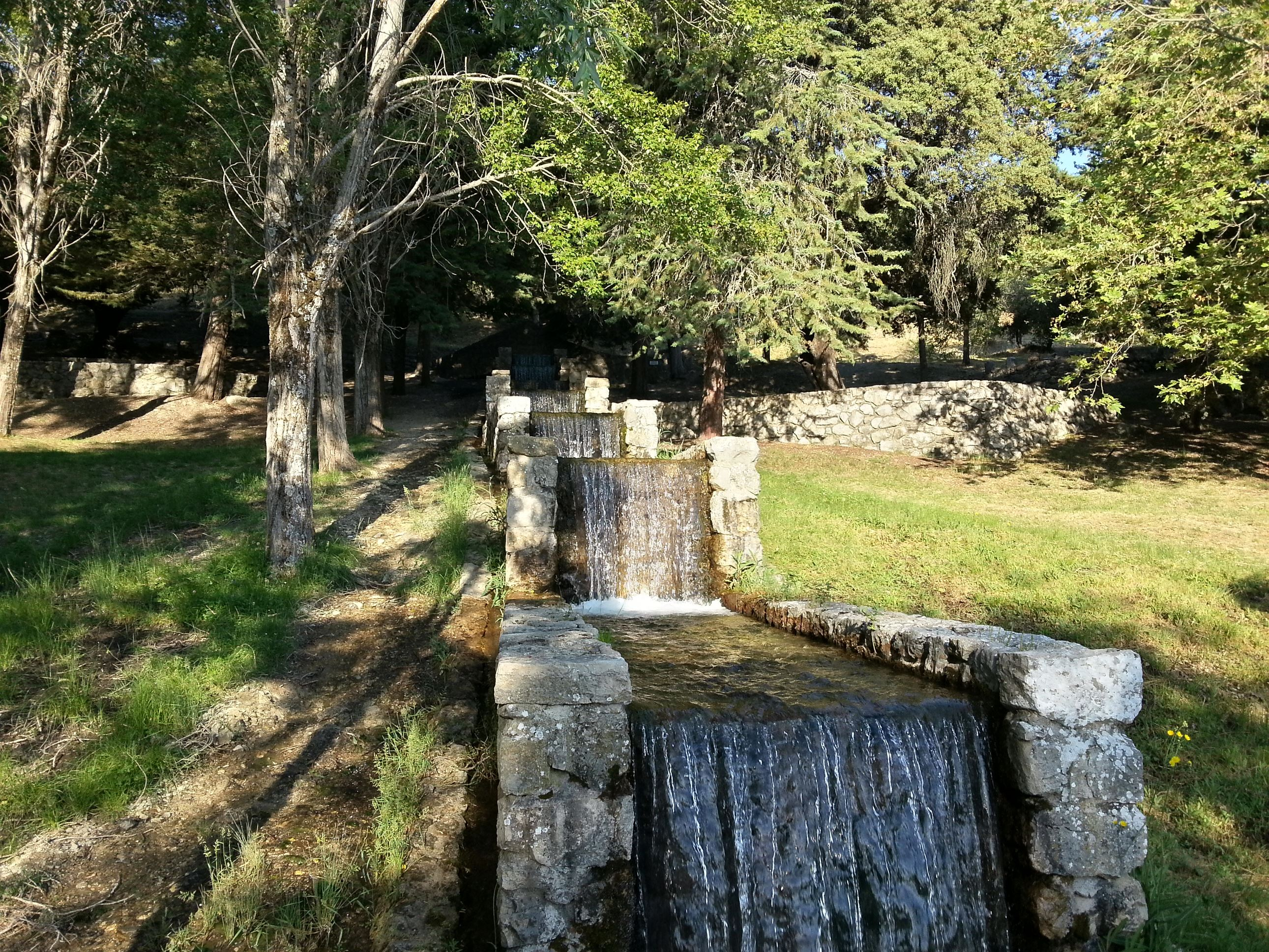
Waterfalls in Fuenmayor.

== See also ==
- Sierra Mágina
- List of municipalities in Jaén
