= Javi Martos =

Spanish footballer

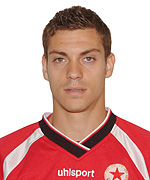
- Martos as a CSKA Sofia player

Personal information
- Full name: Francisco Javier Martos Espigares
- Date of birth: 4 January 1984 (age 42)
- Place of birth: Alamedilla, Spain
- Height: 1.81 m (5 ft 11 1/2 in)
- Position: Centre-back

Youth career
- 1993–2003: Barcelona

Senior career*
Years	Team	Apps	(Gls)
2003–2006	Barcelona C	76	(1)
2006	Barcelona	1	(0)
2006–2007	CSKA Sofia	8	(0)
2007	Girona	18	(1)
2007–2008	Málaga B	24	(0)
2008–2010	Iraklis	45	(0)
2011–2019	Charleroi	286	(0)
2019–2020	Andorra	18	(1)
2020–2023	Prat	69	(3)
Total		545	(6)
- * Club domestic league appearances and goals

Francisco Javier 'Javi' Martos Espigares (born 4 January 1984) is a Spanish former footballer who played as a centre-back.

He spent most of his professional career with Charleroi, having signed with the club in January 2011.

== Club career ==
Born in Alamedilla, Province of Granada, Martos spent one decade in FC Barcelona's youth system, but only represented the C team as a senior. On 20 May 2006 he played his only La Liga game, replacing fellow youth graduate Andrea Orlandi in the second half of a 3–1 loss against Athletic Bilbao at the San Mamés Stadium, as the Frank Rijkaard-led side had already been crowned league champions.

Martos had a brief spell with PFC CSKA Sofia in Bulgaria after being released by the Blaugrana, becoming the first Spaniard to play in the First Professional Football League, then resumed his career in amateur football, first with Girona FC then Atlético Malagueño. In the summer of 2008 summer he joined Iraklis Thessaloniki FC, being first choice and helping the team to back-to-back tenth-place finishes in the Super League Greece.

In early December 2010, Martos went on trial with SD Eibar in his homeland, but nothing came of it. In the following year's winter transfer window, he signed a contract with Royal Charleroi S.C. in Belgium.

Martos was relegated from the Pro League in his first year, but achieved promotion in his first full season after only missing three league matches.
