= Negratín Reservoir =

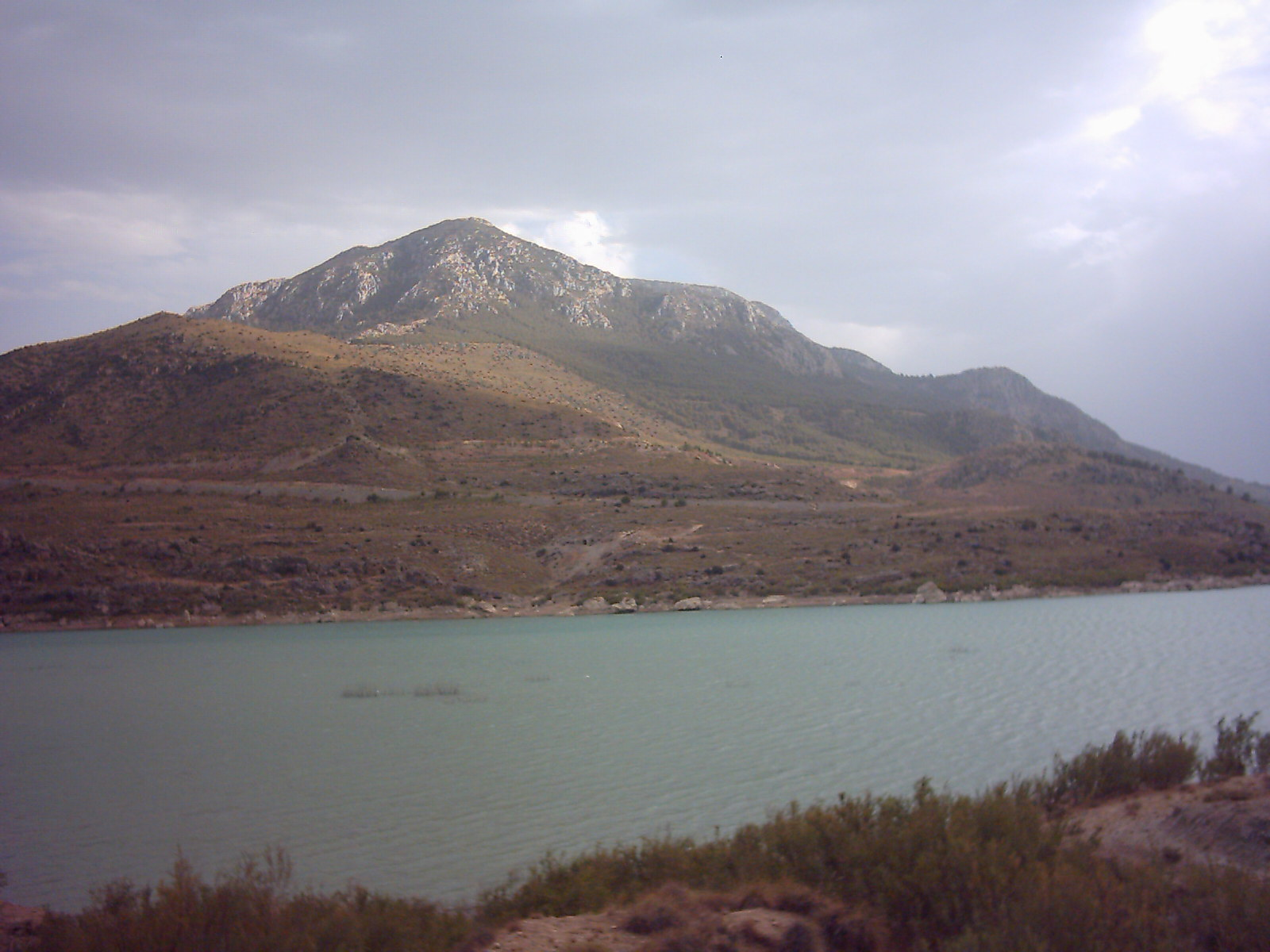
- Embalse del Negratín from Baza

- Location within Andalusia
- Location: Freila
- Coordinates: 37°34′20″N 2°53′16″W
- Type: reservoir
- Primary inflows: Guadiana Menor
- Basin countries: Spain
- Built: 1984

Negratín Reservoir is a reservoir located in Freila, province of Granada, Andalusia, Spain and it is considered one of 11 other reservoirs in Granada.

== Introduction ==
Lake Negratin stands as one of the largest freshwater lakes in Andalusia, created by the Negratin Dam along the Guadiana Menor River. Accessible via the A-315, it can be reached from the nearby villages of Freila, Zujar, or Cuevas del Campo. The lake presents a stunning vista, displaying hues ranging from aquamarine to cobalt blue, influenced by the time of day and the sun's position. Framed by rugged cliffs on its northern bank, the lake provides a picturesque retreat for those seeking tranquility amid natural beauty.

For water enthusiasts, activities such as canoeing and sailing are available through the El Negratin Club Nautico. This sailing club, complete with a lakeside restaurant, is conveniently situated and marked from the village of Cuevas del Campo, offering a delightful opportunity to engage in water sports while enjoying the serene surroundings.

== Dam structure ==
Mixed gravity and loose materials with asphalt screen, straight plant with a crest length of 439 m and 10 meters width. Gated spillway. Botton drains type with 2 channels and a drainage capacity of 120 m3/s.

== Characteristics ==
Covering an expanse of 2,170 hectares and boasting a volumetric capacity of 567 cubic hectometers, this reservoir ranks as the fourth largest in the autonomous community of Andalusia.

The dam is a composite structure, combining elements of both gravity and loose material construction, featuring an asphalt lining for waterproofing. This particular design was opted for due to the insufficient stability of the left abutment, preventing the construction of a concrete dam in that location.

Main Objectives-Purpose of the Negratin Dam & Reservoir:

* Irrigation * Electricity * Fishing * Ecological Flow

== See also ==
- List of reservoirs and dams in Andalusia
