= Benalúa de las Villas =

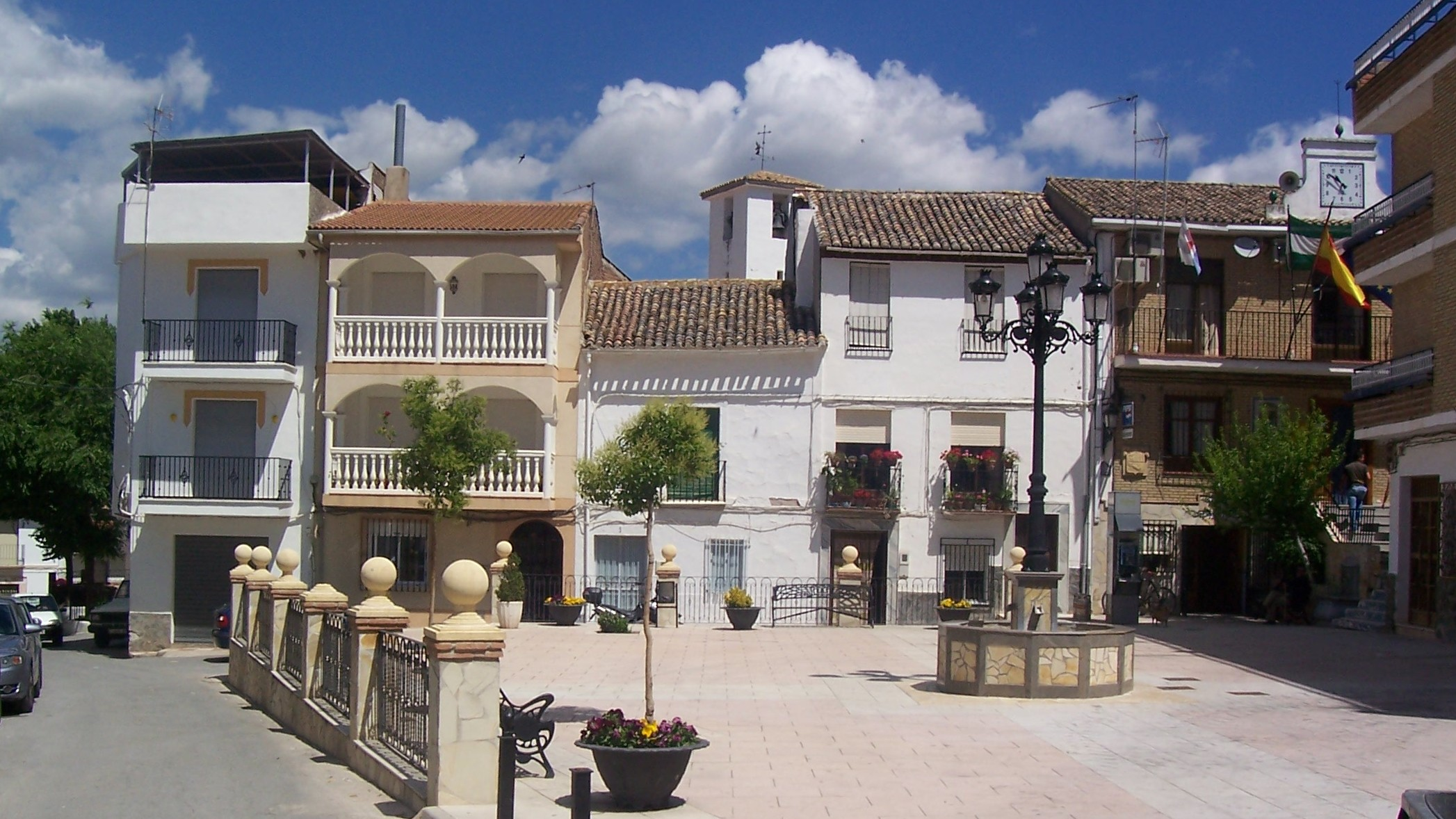
- Place of Spain en Benalúa de las Villas

- Flag Coat of arms

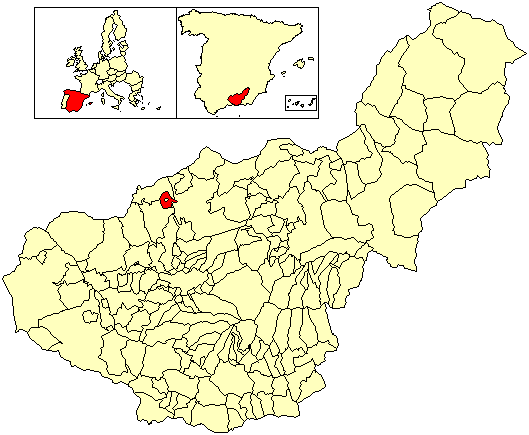
- Location of Benalúa de las Villas

- Location of Benalúa de las Villas in the Province of Granada Location of Benalúa de las Villas in Andalusia Location of Benalúa de las Villas in Spain
- Coordinates: 37°25′54″N 03°40′57″W
- Country: Spain
- Province: Granada
- Comarca: Los Montes

Area
  - Total: 21 km^{2} (8.1 sq mi)
- Elevation: 828 m (2,717 ft)

Population (2025-01-01)
  - Total: 1,028
  - Density: 49/km^{2} (130/sq mi)
- Time zone: UTC+1 (CET)
  - Summer (DST): UTC+2 (CEST)

Benalúa de las Villas is a city located in the province of Granada, Spain. According to the 2005 census (INE), the city has a population of 1,391 inhabitants.

== See also ==
- List of municipalities in Granada
