= Jódar =

Jódar, Spain
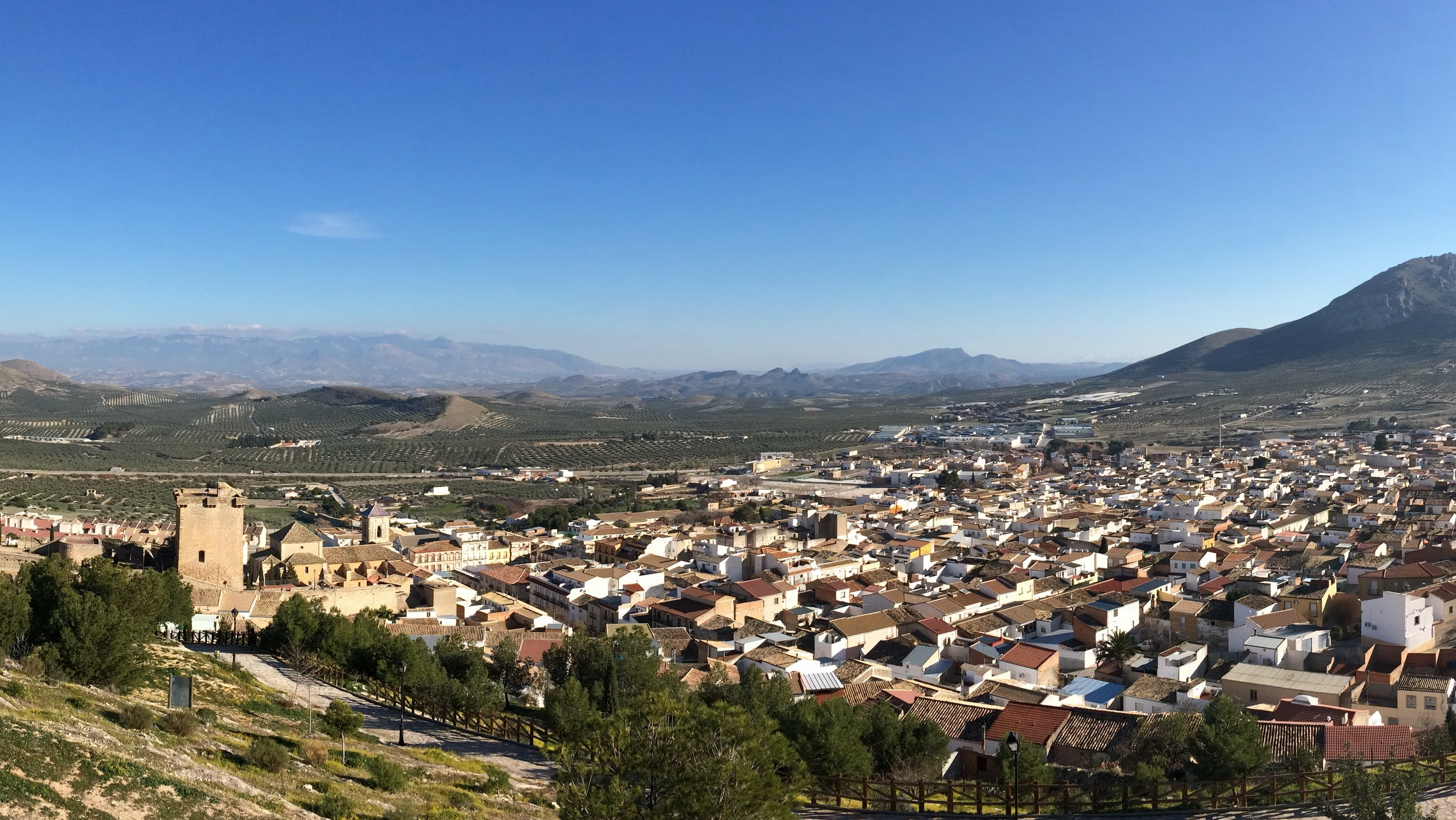

- Flag Coat of arms

- Location in the Province of Jaén Jódar (Andalusia) Jódar (Spain)
- Coordinates: 37°50′N 3°21′W
- Country: Spain
- Autonomous community: Andalusia
- Province: Jaén
- Comarca: Sierra Mágina

Government
  - Mayor: José Luis Angulo Navarro (2007-2011) (IU)

Area
  - Total: 148.78 km^{2} (57.44 sq mi)
- Elevation: 647 m (2,123 ft)

Population (2025-01-01)
  - Total: 11,285
  - Density: 75.850/km^{2} (196.45/sq mi)
- Time zone: UTC+1 (CET)
  - Summer (DST): UTC+2 (CEST)

Jódar is a city in the province of Jaén, Spain. The 2008 census (INE) counted 12119 inhabitants.

The region is agricultural, and produces extra virgin olive oil, green and white asparagus, and cotton.

Jódar is the largest European producer of handcrafted esparto grass arts and crafts, mainly parasols for beach use.

== General information ==
This town is near Mount San Cristóbal, a peak in the north part of the massif of Sierra Mágina, and is the most populous town of the Comarca de Sierra Mágina.

== Geography ==
Mountains and mounts near to the village include:

- Carboneras 1500 m
- La Golondrina 1258 m
- Jódar 1200 m
- Altarillas 1066 m

The climate is Mediterranean, with warm and dry summers and cold winters.

== History ==
There are prehistoric remains in Jódar, at Las Quebradas.

The creation of the town dates back to the 3rd century BCE.

During the al-Andalus period it was called Galdur y Xauda. Its castle is among the oldest in the province, documented since the year 860. In the 10th century the Arab governor Jair Aben Xaquir declared it independent and joined the rebellious Omar Ben Hafsun, later to betray him. One of Omar Ben Hafsun's deputies beheaded him and sent his head to Córdoba. The Christian conquest was carried out by Sancho Martínez de la Torre in 1231, by order of King Fernando III, as a starting point in the battle for Ubeda. In 1485, Diaz Sanchez de Carvajal founded an estate over Jódar, with the approval of the Catholic Monarchs, until the abolition of estate privileges in the 19th century.

== See also ==
- List of municipalities in Jaén
