= Albanchez de Mágina =

Albanchez de Mágina, Spain
- city
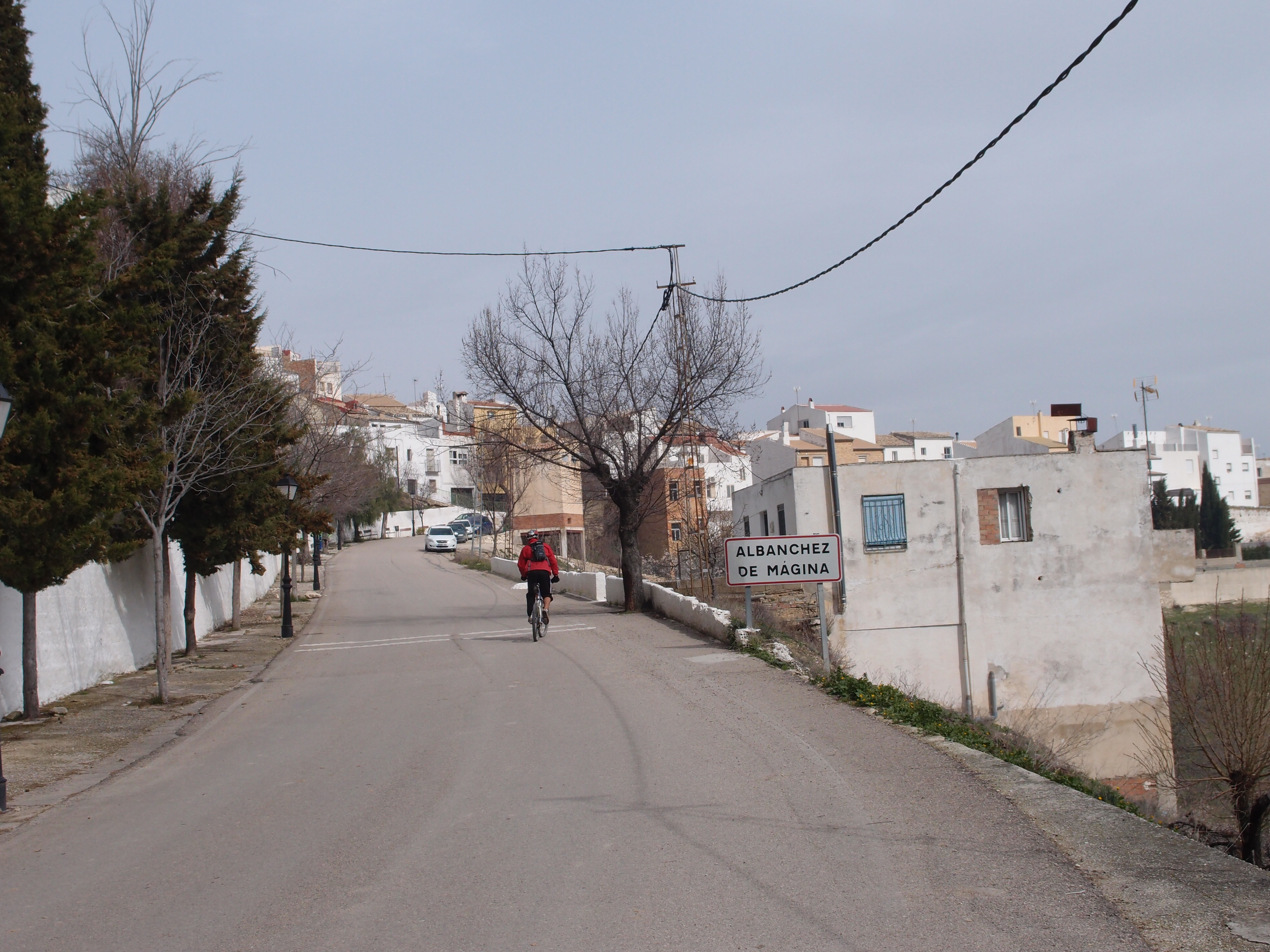

- Coat of arms

- Location in the Province of Jaén Albanchez de Mágina (Andalusia) Albanchez de Mágina (Spain)
- Coordinates: 37°47′30″N 3°27′00″W
- Country: Spain
- Autonomous community: Andalusia
- Province: Jaén
- Municipality: Albanchez de Mágina

Area
  - Total: 38.83 km^{2} (14.99 sq mi)
- Elevation: 862 m (2,828 ft)

Population (2025-01-01)
  - Total: 903
  - Density: 23.3/km^{2} (60.2/sq mi)
- Time zone: UTC+1 (CET)
  - Summer (DST): UTC+2 (CEST)

Albanchez de Mágina (formerly known Albanchez de Úbeda) is a town located in the province of Jaén, Spain. According to 2024 (INE) figures, the town had a population of 930 inhabitants.

== See also ==
- Pico Mágina
- List of municipalities in Jaén
