= Diego Fernández de la Cueva, 1st Viscount of Huelma =

Diego Fernández de la Cueva, 1st Viscount of Huelma (died 26 November 1473) was a Spanish nobleman.

== Biography ==
Diego Fernández de la Cueva was born in Úbeda, Andalusia, Crown of Castille. He was a merchant and banker of King Henry IV of Castile, who granted him the title of 1st Viscount of Huelma.

He was related to or perhaps a descendant of Juan Sánchez de la Cueva, a nobleman from Úbeda, Regedor or Veinte y Quatro (24) of Úbeda in 1367, who rose pennant for the usurper Henry, Count of Trastamara, bribed by his generous promises. He was also a relative and a contemporary of another Diego de la Cueva, Alcalde of Caltinovo, married to María Cortés, whose daughter María Cortés married Rodrigo or Ruy Fernández de Monroy, paternal grandparents of Hernán Cortés.

He married Maior Alfonso de Mercado from Úbeda and had three sons, including :

- Beltrán de la Cueva (c. 1435-1492), close confidant of Enrique IV, first Duke of Alburquerque, first Count of Huelma and Ledesma, Grand Master of the Order of Santiago.

King Enrique IV, in his second year as King, travelled to Úbeda and stayed with Diego. When he left this house, he took Diego's second oldest son, Beltrán, with him to stay at Court to show his gratitude to Diego. (Diego offered Beltrán after Enrique asked for Diego's oldest son Juan, whom Diego wanted to keep close by).

== See also ==
- Henry IV of Castile
- Beltrán de la Cueva
- War of the Castilian Succession

== Notes ==
Spanish nobility
New title	Viscount of Huelma; 1460–1473	Succeeded by Juan de la Cueva
