= Pico Mágina =

Mountain in Spain

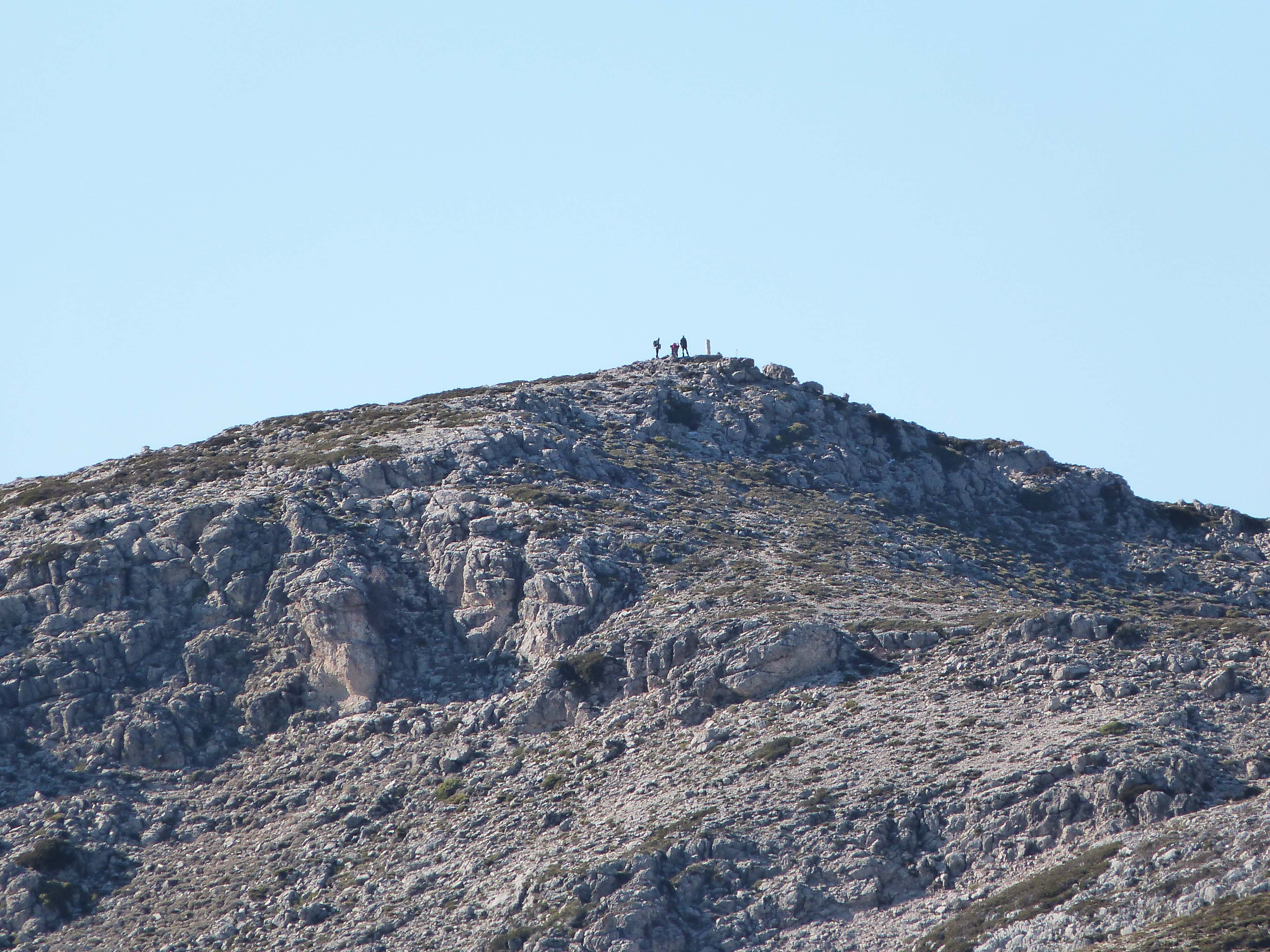
- The summit in December 2011

Highest point
- Elevation: 2,165 m (7,103 ft)
- Prominence: 1,135 m (3,724 ft)
- Listing: Ribu
- Coordinates: 37°43′30″N 03°28′00″W

Geography
- Location within Spain
- Location: Jaén Province, Andalusia
- Parent range: Sierra Mágina

Climbing
- First ascent: ancestral
- Easiest route: hike

Pico Mágina is a 2,165-metre-high (7,103 ft) mountain in Spain.

== Geography ==
The mountain is located in Jaén Province, in the northern part of the autonomous community of Andalusia. It's the highest peak of the province and also of Sierra Mágina, and is located on the border between the municipalities of Albanchez de Mágina and Huelma.

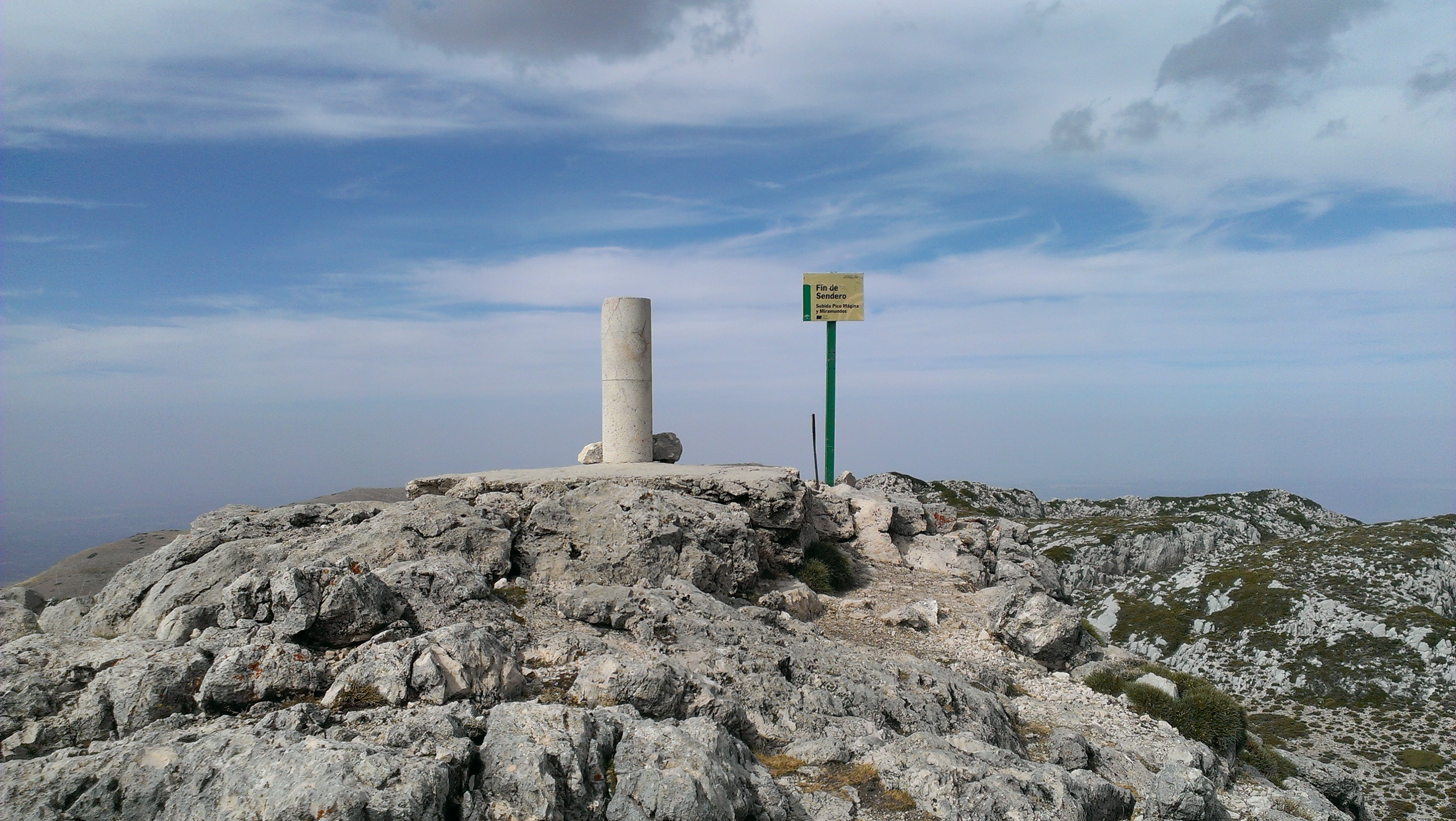
Peak Mágina's geodesic vertex (2,164 masl) and endpoint of his climb path.

== Access to the summit ==
The summit can be accessed by hiking trails. The walk up to the summit is quite long: the first part follows a dirt road and the last one a hiking path through rocky terrain.

== Nature conservation ==
The mountain and most of its chain are included from 1989 in the Parque Natural de Sierra Mágina.

== See also ==
- Baetic System
