= Antonio Valero (footballer, born 1971) =

Spanish footballer

Personal information
- Full name: Antonio Valero Ruiz
- Date of birth: 18 June 1971 (age 55)
- Place of birth: Dehesas de Guadix, Spain
- Height: 1.77 m (5 ft 10 in)
- Position: Midfielder

Senior career*
Years	Team	Apps	(Gls)
1994–1995	San Fernando	29	(8)
1995–1996	CP Almería	11	(1)
1996–1997	Polideportivo Ejido	35	(5)
1997–2001	Motril	97	(12)
2007–2008	Granada 74	35	(0)
Total		207	(26)
- * Club domestic league appearances and goals

Antonio Valero Ruiz (born 18 June 1971) is a Spanish former footballer who played as a midfielder.

== Career ==
Born in Dehesas de Guadix, Valero played club football for San Fernando, CP Almería, Polideportivo Ejido, Motril and Granada 74.
