= Villanueva de las Torres =

Villanueva de las Torres, Spain
- city
- Coat of arms

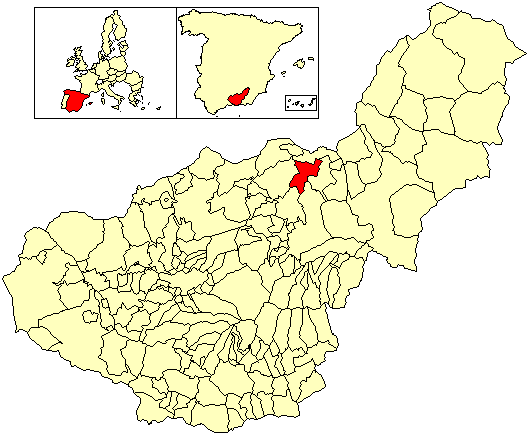
- Location of Villanueva de las Torres
- Coordinates: 37°33′N 3°05′W
- Country: Spain
- Province: Granada
- Municipality: Villanueva de las Torres

Area
  - Total: 66 km^{2} (25 sq mi)

Population (2025-01-01)
  - Total: 491
  - Density: 7.4/km^{2} (19/sq mi)
- Time zone: UTC+1 (CET)
  - Summer (DST): UTC+2 (CEST)

Villanueva de las Torres is a municipality located in the province of Granada, Spain. According to the 2004 census (INE), the city has a population of 786 inhabitants.

== See also ==
- List of municipalities in Granada
