= Rafael López Guzmán =

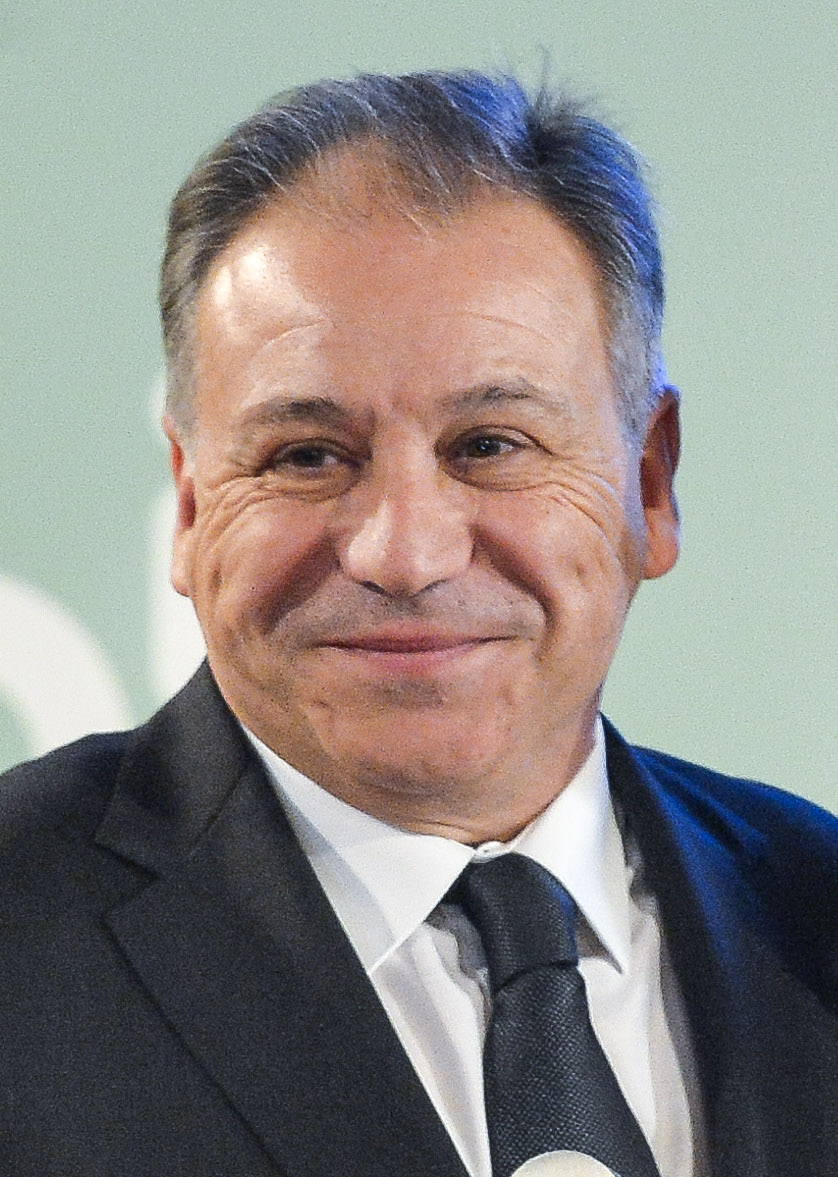

Rafael López Guzmán (born 1958) is a Spanish catedratico and has a Phd in art history. He is an expert in mudejar art in Spain and Latin America. He is a professor in the Universidad de Granada, Spain.

== Books ==
He has published several books and articles on mudejar art and colonial art in Spain and Mexico.

"Tradición y Clasicismo en la Granada del siglo XVI: Arquitectura Civil y Urbanismo" . (Granada, Diputación,1987)
"Arquitectura Mudéjar Granadina". (Granada, Caja de Ahorros,1990.)
"Arquitectura y Carpintería Mudéjar en Nueva España." (México, Azabache, 1992)
"Arquitectura Mudéjar: Del sincretismo medieval a las alternativas americanas" (Madrid, Cátedra, 2000).
"Los Palacios del Renacimiento" (Granada, Diputación, 2005)
"Territorio, poblamiento y arquitectura. México en las relaciones geográficas de Felipe II" (Granada, Universidad, 2007)

He has made several introductions to books of art such as Arquitectura imaginaria Al-Azrak: el Palacio Azul by León R. Zahar, Editorial Artes de México, 1999 (introductory note by Prof. Oleg Grabar). He also made a presentation for the book, Taracea islamica y mudejar, Editorial Artes de Mexico, 2000 by the same author and for the book Arte islamico, evocacion del Paraiso, El Colegio de México, 2008 by the same author.
