= Guadiana Menor =

River in Spain

Guadiana Menor River
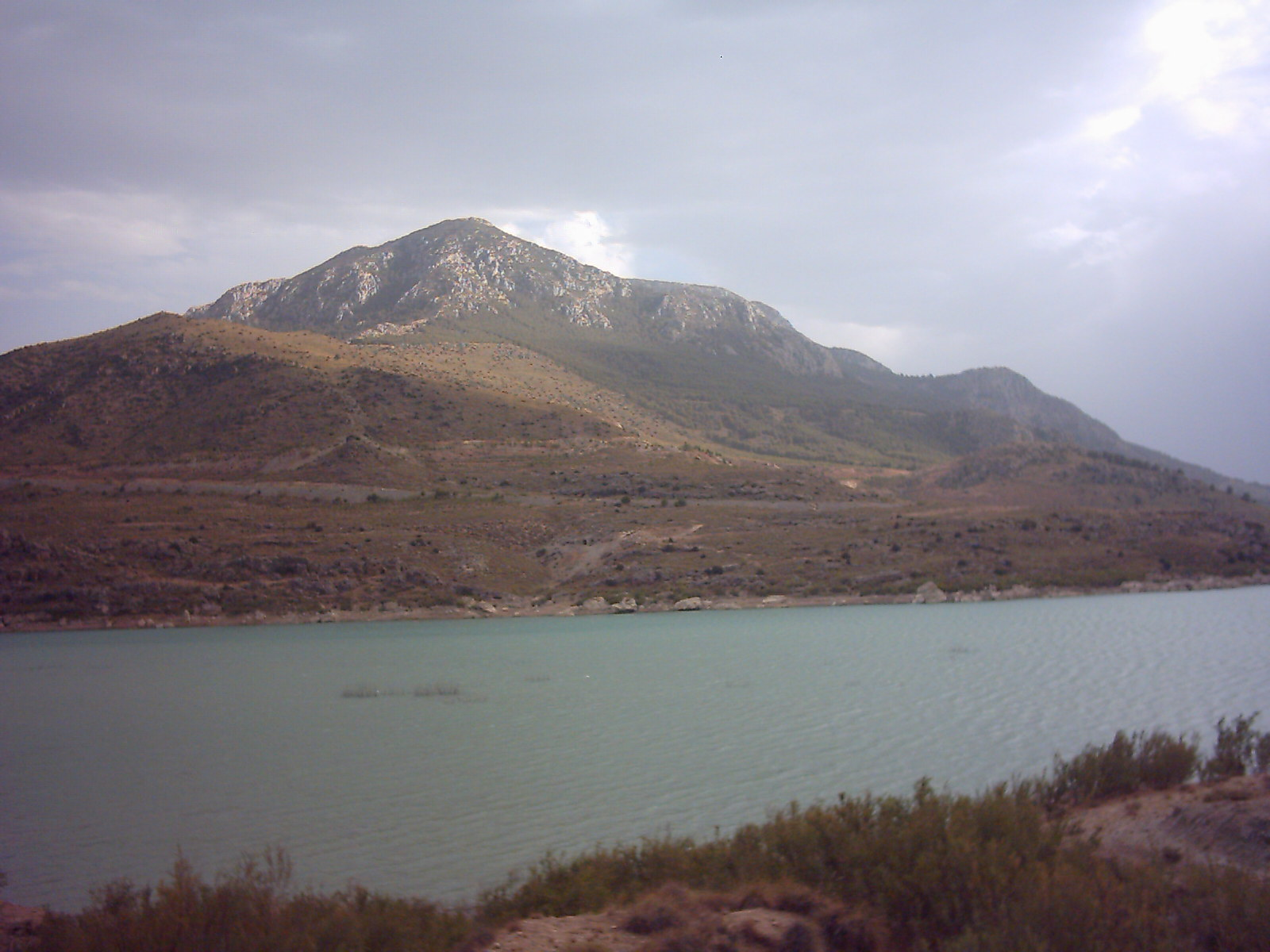
- View of the river at the Negratín Reservoir

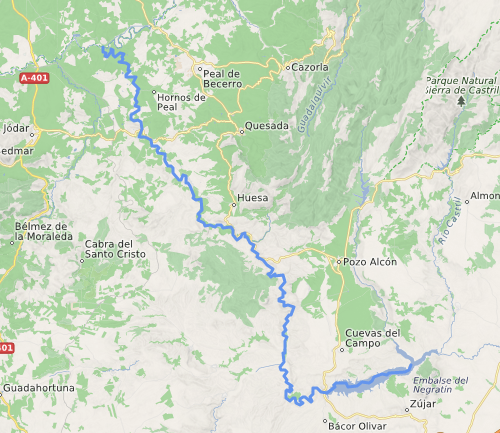
- Location of the Guadiana Menor

Location
- Country: Spain
- Region: Andalusia

Physical characteristics
- Source: Sierra de Baza
  - location: Guadalquivir
  - elevation: 630 m
- 2nd source
  - location: Granada; Jaén
- Mouth: Guadalquivir River, on the left bank
  - coordinates: 37°56′07″N 3°15′27″W
- Length: 182 km
- Basin size: 7251 km²
- Discharge
  - location: 15.76 m³/s

Basin features
- Tributaries
  - left: Guadahortuna River

The Guadiana Menor River is a river in southern Spain, one of the main tributaries of the Guadalquivir River, on its left bank. It has a total length of 182 km (including the length of its upper stretches known as the Baza River and Gallego River), and it drains a large basin of 7,251 km². Administratively, it flows through the provinces of Granada and Jaén in the autonomous community of Andalusia.

In 1977, the Guadalquivir Hydrographic Confederation published a book titled Guadalquivires, which endorsed the thesis that the true source of the Guadalquivir is the Guadiana Menor–Barbata, considered as a single river.

== Etymology ==
The name has an origin independent of the Guadiana River, as it derives from its original Hispanic name (Anas) with the prefix Wadi, meaning valley in Arabic.

== Geography ==
The designation Guadiana Menor is usually applied to the stretch downstream of the confluence of the Fardes River with the Barbata or Guardal. Its main tributaries are the Fardes and Guadahortuna on the left bank, and the Ceal and Toya on the right bank, in addition to those that flow into the Barbata upstream: the Castril, the Cúllar, and the Guadalentín, which should not be confused with the tributary of the Segura River.

The Negratín Reservoir (Province of Granada) is located on the Barbata–Guardal River. In some cases, the name "Guadiana Menor" has also been applied to the stretch of water between this reservoir and the confluence with the Fardes River. Historically, this stretch was called "the Great River" due to the significant increase in flow that occurred when the Castril and Guadalentín rivers, which are more voluminous than the main river, joined the Guardal–Barbata.

No source attributes the designation Guadiana Menor to the entire course of the Barbata–Guardal, although technically they are one and the same river.

== Hydrographic Basin ==
Its basin includes the depressions of Baza and Guadix, a former inland sea in the Pliocene that opened its waters to the Guadalquivir through the Cerrada del Negratín, forming the current Guadiana.

In this former endorheic basin, sheltered from rainfall, precipitation is very scarce, which, combined with the nature of its soil, mostly composed of gypsum, causes the rivers that converge toward the Guadiana to have an intermittent and irregular character. The extensive basin encompasses territories in the provinces of Granada, Jaén, Albacete, Murcia, and Almería. The Cañada del Salar, in the hamlet of Topares, Almería, is the point in the Guadalquivir basin where water must travel the greatest distance to reach its mouth.

The basin of the Guadiana Menor is the second largest among the tributaries of the Guadalquivir, with a surface area of 7,251 km². The largest is that of the Genil River.

The following table attempts to identify the primary and secondary tributaries of greatest length.

River Network of the Guadiana Menor
River		Source	Mouth	Length (km)
Guardal River		Sierra Seca	Right bank	50.7
-	Raigadas River	Sierra de la Sagra	Guardal River	16.3
-	Galera River	Sierra de María	Guardal River	25.4
-	Huéscar River^{a}	Sierra de la Sagra	Galera River	34.2
-	Cúllar River	Sierra de Orce	Guardal River	35.5
-	Baza River	Sierra de Baza	Guardal River	48.8
-	Castril River	Sierra de Castril	Guardal River	48.1
Guadalentín River		Sierra de Cazorla	Right bank	47.6
Baúl Stream		n/a	Left bank	26.8
Fardes River		Sierra de Huétor	Left bank	72
-	Morollón River	Sierra de la Peza	Fardes River	11
-	Alhama River	Sierra Nevada	Fardes River	21.6
-	Guadix River^{b}	Sierra Nevada	Fardes River	35.7
-	Gor River	Sierra de Gor	Fardes River	30.3
Guadahortuna River		Montes Orientales	Left bank	59.1
Ceal River		Sierra de Cazorla	Right bank	14.9
Toya River^{c}		Sierra de Cazorla	Right bank	25.7
Guadiana Menor River		Sierra de Baza^{d}	Guadalquivir River	182

Notes

^{a} Also called the Barbata River.
^{b} Also called the Verde River.
^{c} Also called the Extremera River.

^{d} Including the Baza River and Gallego River.

== Bibliography ==
- Mateo Quero, Soledad (2014). Estudio de impacto ambiental de una cantera situada en la provincia de Jaén, considerando el proceso de restauración de la misma (Thesis) (in Spanish). Universidad de Jaén.
- Salazar, Carlos; Torres, Juan Antonio; Cano, Eusebio (2001). "Aspectos ecológicos y botánicos de la depresión del Guadiana Menor (Sureste de España)". Boletín del Inst. De Estudios Giennenses (in Spanish) (178): 145–176. ISSN 0561-3590.
- Regional Government of Andalusia. Plan de Gestión de las ZEC Río Guadiana menor-tramo inferior (ES6160011), Río Jándula (ES6160012), Río Guadalimar (ES6160014) y Río Guadiana menor-tramo superior (ES6160015) (in Spanish). Boletín Oficial de la Junta de Andalucía. Extraordinary No. 16 - Sunday, 23 June 2019.
- Rodríguez Rodríguez, Jesús; Zoldo Naranjo, Florencio; Español Echániz, Ignacio Miguel (2012). Los paisajes fluviales en la planificación y gestión del agua: Elementos para la consideración del paisaje en la cuenca hidrográfica del Guadalquivir (in Spanish). Centro de Estudios Paisaje y Territorio (CEPT). ISBN 978-84-695-2039-0.
- VV. AA. (2012). Los paisajes fluviales en la planificación y gestión del agua. Elementos para la consideración del paisaje en la Cuenca Hidrográfica del Guadalquivir [River landscapes in water planning and management. Elements for the consideration of the landscape in the Guadalquivir Hydrographic Basin] (PDF) (in Spanish). Confederación Hidrográfica del Guadalquivir. ISBN 978-84-695-2039-0. Legal Deposit: SE1888-2012.
