= Píñar =

- municipality
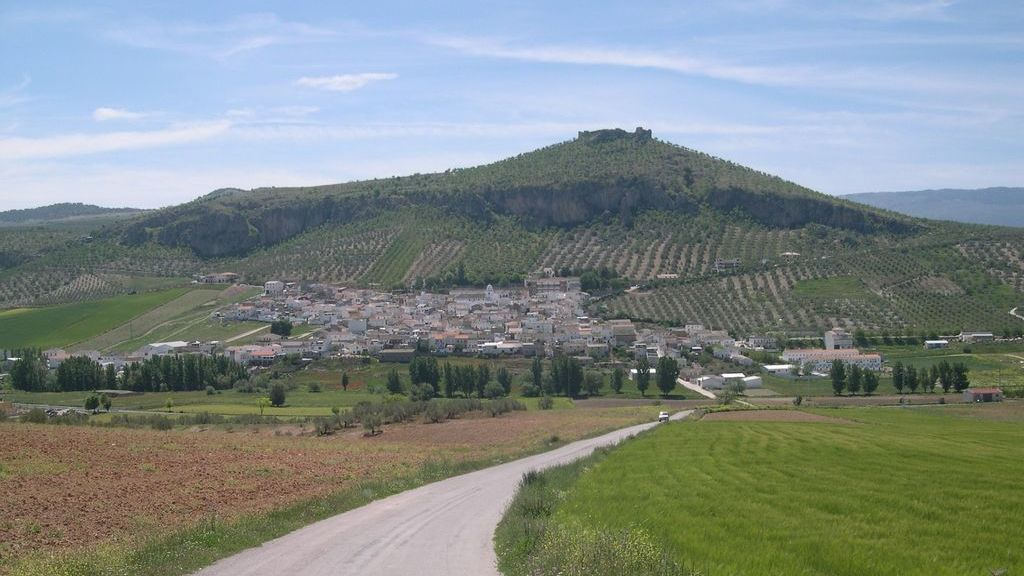

- Coat of arms

- Location in Spain
- Coordinates: 37°7′N 3°35′W
- Country: Spain
- Province: Granada
- Comarca: Los Montes

Government
  - Mayor: María Inmaculada Oria López

Area
  - Total: 122 km^{2} (47 sq mi)
- Elevation: 950 m (3,120 ft)

Population (2025-01-01)
  - Total: 1,040
  - Density: 8.52/km^{2} (22.1/sq mi)
- Time zone: UTC+1 (CET)
  - Summer (DST): UTC+2 (CEST)

Píñar is a municipality located in the province of Granada, Spain. It is located at 46 km from Granada, and 11 km from Iznalloz, capital of the Comarca of Los Montes.

It is home to the ruins of a large castle (likely founded by the Romans and later re-used by the Moors), that has been declared a national monument, and is the location of the Cuevas de las Ventanas, a group of caves.

The Carigüela archaeological site located within the communal territory has evidence of human cultural development that has been dated to the Neolithic period.

Its sister city is Tetuán, Morocco.

== See also ==
- List of municipalities in Granada
