= Freila =

- city
- Flag Coat of arms

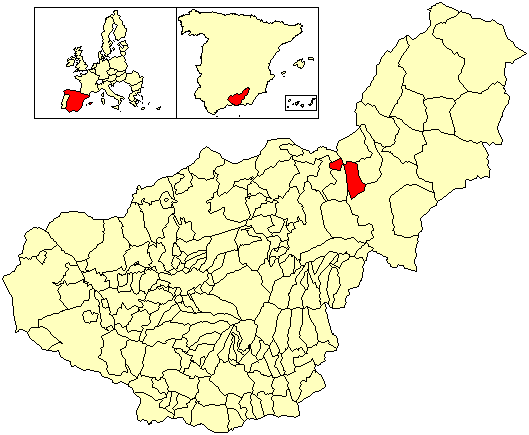
- Location of Freila
- Coordinates: 37°31′N 2°53′W
- Country: Spain
- Province: Granada
- Municipality: Freila

Area
  - Total: 60 km^{2} (23 sq mi)
- Elevation: 822 m (2,697 ft)

Population (2025-01-01)
  - Total: 960
  - Density: 16/km^{2} (41/sq mi)
- Time zone: UTC+1 (CET)
  - Summer (DST): UTC+2 (CEST)
- Website: http://www.altipla.com/freila/

Freila is a municipality located in the province of Granada, Spain. According to the 2005 census (INE), the city has a population of 1039 inhabitants.

== See also ==
- List of municipalities in Granada
