= Alicún de Ortega =

Coordinates: 37°36′N 3°08′W

Alicún de Ortega, Spain
- Coat of arms

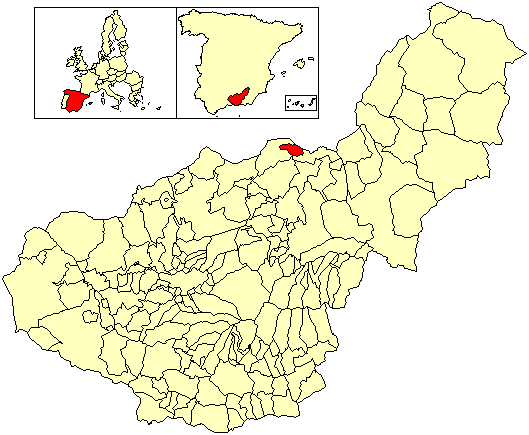
- Location of Alicún de Ortega
- Country: Spain
- Province: Granada
- Municipality: Alicún de Ortega

Area
  - Total: 24 km^{2} (9.3 sq mi)
- Elevation: 680 m (2,230 ft)

Population (2025-01-01)
  - Total: 461
  - Density: 19/km^{2} (50/sq mi)
- Time zone: UTC+1 (CET)
  - Summer (DST): UTC+2 (CEST)

Alicún de Ortega is a village located at the province of Granada, Spain.

In the Islamic era, it was known as ‘Hisn-Laqoon’ - ‘the fort of Luqun’ (Alicun), an strategic outpost of the sub-region of Guadix in the Emirate of Granada. In the year 836 Hijri of the Islamic calendar or 1433 Gregorian, it was captured by the forces of Castile, a regretful loss as recorded in the poetry of the 15th century scholar Abdul Kareem Al-Basti (of Baza). According to the 2005 census (INE), it has a population of 563 inhabitants.

== See also ==
- List of municipalities in Granada
