= Torre-Cardela =

Coordinates: 37°30′N 3°21′W

- city
- Flag Coat of arms

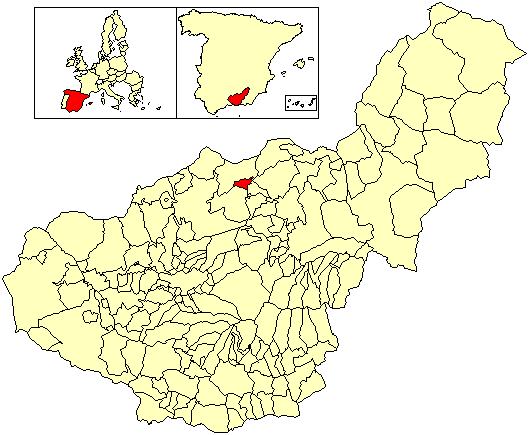
- Location of Torre-Cardela
- Country: Spain
- Province: Granada
- Municipality: Torre-Cardela

Area
  - Total: 15 km^{2} (5.8 sq mi)

Population (2025-01-01)
  - Total: 700
  - Density: 47/km^{2} (120/sq mi)
- Time zone: UTC+1 (CET)
  - Summer (DST): UTC+2 (CEST)

Torre-Cardela is a municipality located in the province of Granada, Spain. According to the 2004 census (INE), the city had a population of 1,134.

== See also ==
- List of municipalities in Granada
