= Boletín Oficial de la Junta de Andalucía =

Periodical

The Boletín Oficial de la Junta de Andalucía (BOJA, "Official Bulletin of the Andalusian Autonomous Government"), is the official gazette of the Andalusian Autonomous Government (Spanish Junta de Andalucía). It publishes the laws effected by the Parliament of Andalusia, and other official announcements of the Andalusian autonomous government.

Prior to 2003, BOJA was published Tuesday, Thursday, and Saturday. Since 2003, it has been published daily Monday through Friday except holidays; occasional special editions (Spanish: boletines extraordinarios) may be published on weekends.

BOJA is published by the office of the presidency of the Andalusian Autonomous Government (Spanish: Consejería de Presidencia de la Junta de Andalucía). Annual subscriptions are available; there are also bookstores that sell individual copies. Issues are numbered within the calendar year; pages are also numbered continuously through the year, rather than the individual issue. Special editions are numbered independently, both in terms of page numbers and the issue as a whole.

The print edition of the BOJA contains the official texts of laws and other documents. An online version is provided for convenience, but is not guaranteed to reproduce official texts exactly.
