= Alamedilla =

Alamedilla, Spain
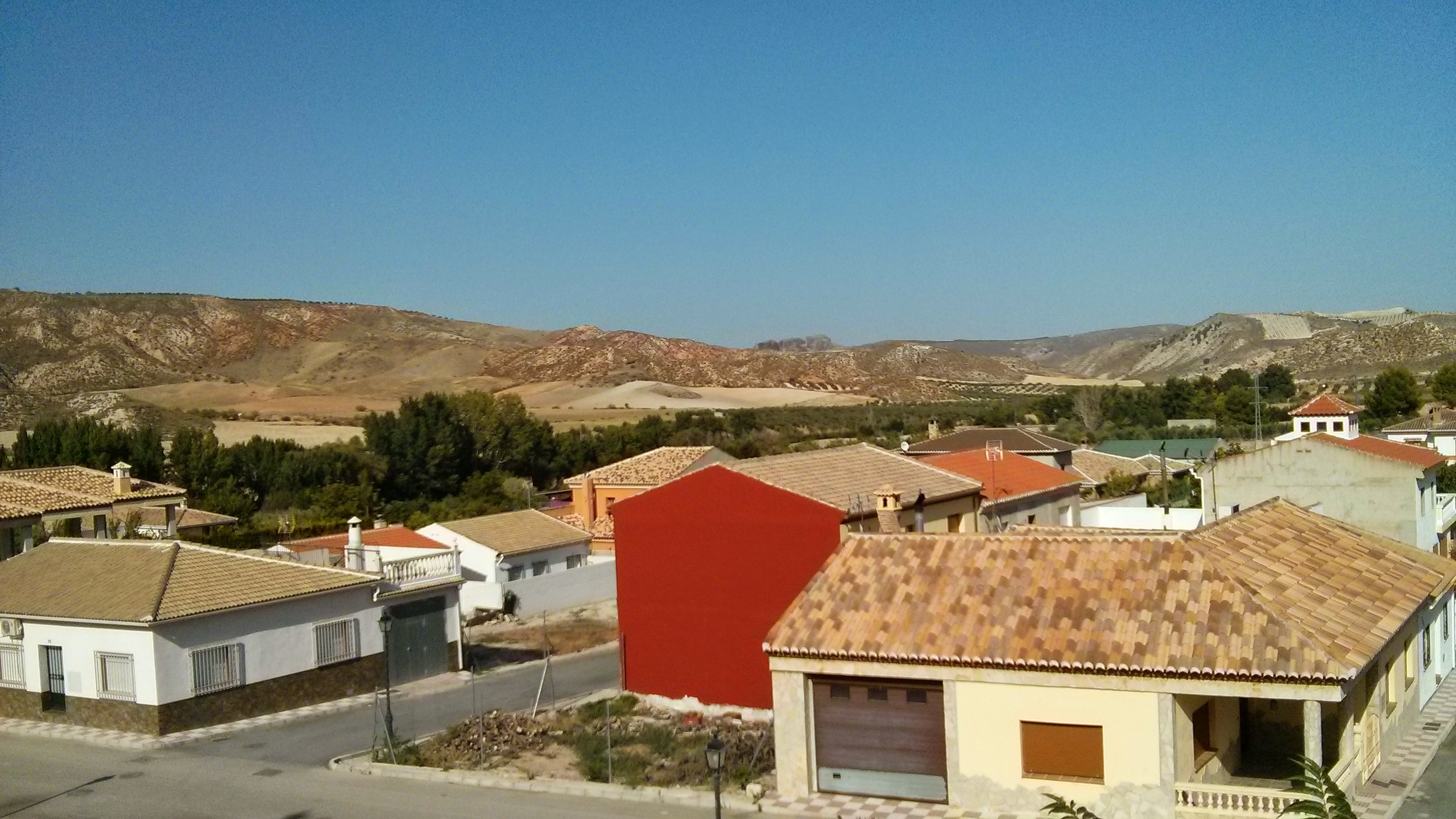
- Flag Coat of arms
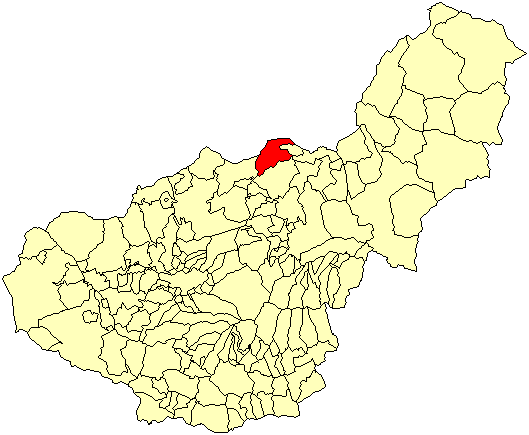
- Coordinates: 37.581667°N 3.244444°W
- Country: Spain
- Province: Granada
- Municipality: Alamedilla

Area
  - Total: 90 km^{2} (35 sq mi)
- Elevation: 862 m (2,828 ft)

Population (2025-01-01)
  - Total: 518
  - Density: 5.8/km^{2} (15/sq mi)
- Time zone: UTC+1 (CET)
  - Summer (DST): UTC+2 (CEST)
- Website: http://www.alamedilla.es/

Alamedilla is a city located in the province of Granada, Spain. According to the 2005 census (INE), the city has a population of 811 inhabitants.

== See also ==
- List of municipalities in Granada
