= Iznalloz =

- Municipality
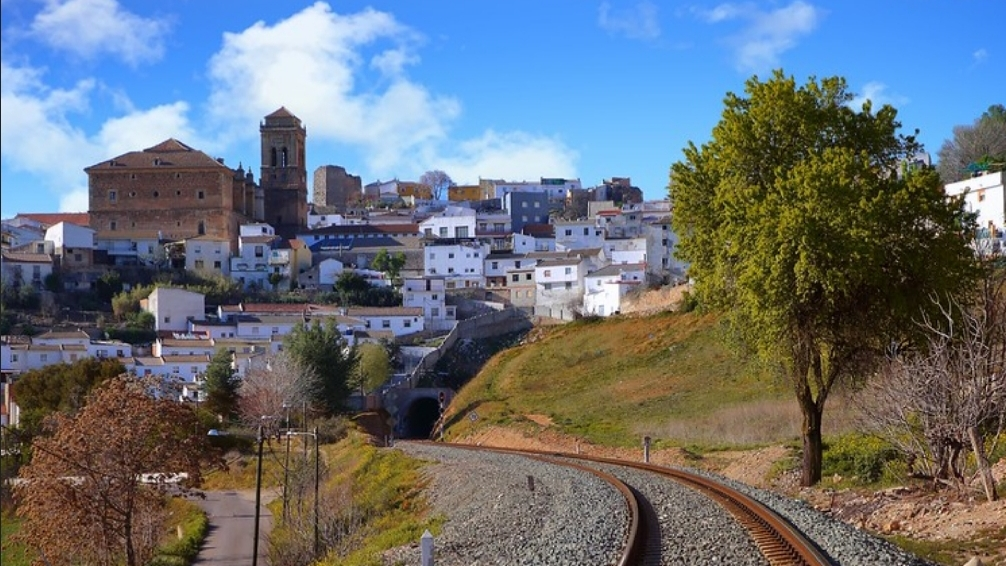
- Iznalloz

- Flag Coat of arms

- Location in Spain
- Coordinates: 37°23′33″N 03°31′21″W
- Country: Spain
- Autonomous community: Andalusia
- Province: Granada
- Comarca: Los Montes
- Judicial district: Granada

Government
  - Mayor: Mariano José Lorente García (2007)

Area
  - Total: 310.03 km^{2} (119.70 sq mi)
- Elevation: 808 m (2,651 ft)

Population (2025-01-01)
  - Total: 5,179
  - Density: 16.70/km^{2} (43.27/sq mi)
- Demonym: Acatuccitanos
- Time zone: UTC+1 (CET)
  - Summer (DST): UTC+2 (CEST)
- Postal code: 18550

Iznalloz is a small town about 35 km north of Granada, Spain. The town is the main center of a region known as Los Montes Orientales, which comprises about 17 towns and villages spread over the north of the province of Granada. Encompassed within this area is the Sierra Arana mountain range (highest peak just over 2000 m).

== History ==
There are prehistoric paintings and tools in the caves surrounding the village. The Iberian peoples are thought to have settled here.

The village sits on the banks of the River Cubillas and what was once on an important Roman road to Tarraco (ancient Roman name for Tarragona) traversing via the south eastern coastline of the Iberian peninsula.

The people of Iznalloz attribute their origins to the Romans and call themselves Acatuccitanos, after Acatucci, the Roman name for the village. Roman imperial soldiers built a garrison, on the hill in what is now the old quarter of the village, and constructed a bridge over the river which remains in use. The origin of the modern name, Iznalloz, has its roots in the Arabic Hisn Allauz which means ‘castle of Almond trees’. Only the ruins of the castle remain, but it formed part of the front line of Muslim defense during the latter days of the reconquest of Spain. The village fell into Christian hands in 1486, after which Iznalloz and its neighbouring villages aided in the siege of Granada. As payment for their services the people of Iznalloz were exempt from various taxes.

Following the Catholic reconquest of Granada, Iznalloz became an important centre for commerce and agriculture. Due to the growing population of workers, and their importance to the local economy, the Reyes Catolicos (Catholic Monarchs) decreed the construction of a hospital to care for the infirm. The building which is now called El Posito became a store for the village harvests.

== Main sights ==
- 16th century church of Ntra. Sra. de los Remedios (16th century), designed by Diego de Siloé and the ruins of an ancient Moorish castle.
- Roma Bridge over the Cubillas river
- Castillo de los almendros, remains, including two towers, of a Moorish fortress
- Cueva del agua, a group of Jurassic caves where numerous findings from the Stone Age have been found

== Economics ==
Agriculture is Iznalloz's major source of income and the cultivation of olives is by far the most common agricultural activity in the municipality. The local mountain range of Sierra Arana contains a large number of caves. Of these the deepest is La Cueva del Agua (Cave of water).

== See also ==
- List of municipalities in Granada
