= Dehesas de Guadix =

Dehesas de Guadix, Spain
- Flag Coat of arms

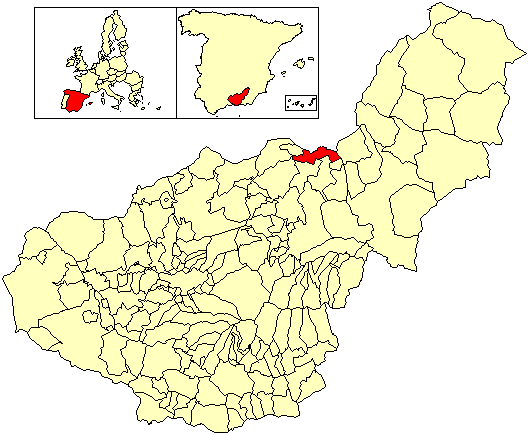
- Location of Dehesas de Guadix
- Coordinates: 37°35′N 3°06′W
- Country: Spain
- Province: Granada
- Municipality: Dehesas de Guadix

Area
  - Total: 72 km^{2} (28 sq mi)
- Elevation: 681 m (2,234 ft)

Population (2025-01-01)
  - Total: 382
  - Density: 5.3/km^{2} (14/sq mi)
- Time zone: UTC+1 (CET)
  - Summer (DST): UTC+2 (CEST)

Dehesas de Guadix is a municipality located in the province of Granada, Spain. According to the 2005 census (INE), the city has a population of 556 inhabitants.

== See also ==
- List of municipalities in Granada
