= Montejícar =

Coordinates: 37°34′N 3°30′W

- Flag Coat of arms

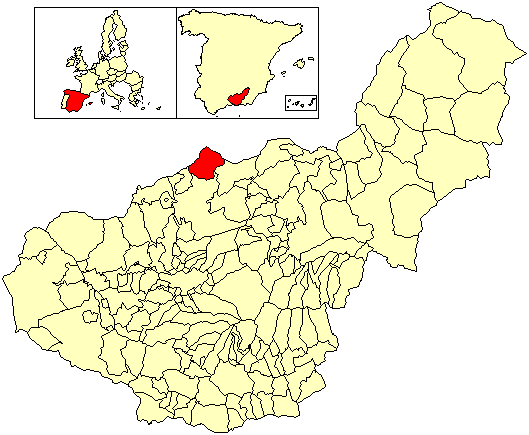

- Location in Spain.
- Country: Spain
- Autonomous community: Andalusia
- Province: Granada

Area
  - Total: 87.73 km^{2} (33.87 sq mi)
- Elevation: 1,137 m (3,730 ft)

Population (2025-01-01)
  - Total: 1,989
  - Density: 22.67/km^{2} (58.72/sq mi)
- Time zone: UTC+1 (CET)
  - Summer (DST): UTC+2 (CEST)
- Website: www.aytomontejicar.com

Montejícar is a municipality in the province of Granada, Spain. As of 2010, it has a population of 2464 inhabitants.

== See also ==
- List of municipalities in Granada
