= Province of Jaén (Spain) =

Province of Spain

Province of Jaén Provincia de Jaén (Spanish)
- Province
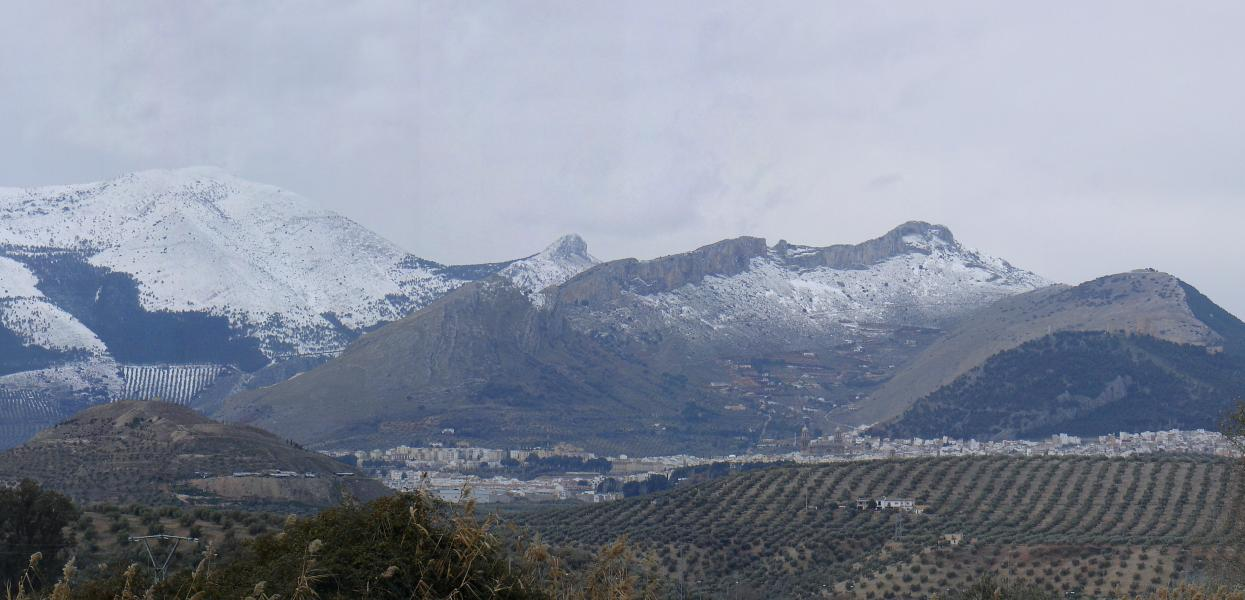
- Jaén mountains

- Flag Coat of arms

- Location of the Province of Jaén in Spain
- Coordinates: 38°00′N 3°30′W
- Country: Spain
- Autonomous community: Andalusia
- Capital: Jaén
- Municipalities: 97

Government
  - President: Francisco Reyes (PSOE)

Area
  - Total: 13,493.33 km^{2} (5,209.80 sq mi)
  - Rank: 14th in Spain
- 2.7% of Spain

Population (2025)
  - Total: 618,143
  - Rank: 27th in Spain
  - Density: 45.8110/km^{2} (118.650/sq mi)
- 1.3% of Spain
- Demonym(s): jienense jiennense giennense jaenero, -a jaenés, -a
- Time zone: UTC+1 (Central European Time)
  - Summer (DST): UTC+2 (Central European Summer Time)
- Postal code: 23
- Area code: 953
- ISO 3166 code: ES-J
- Official language(s): Spanish
- Congress seats: 5 (out of 350)
- Senate seats: 4 (out of 250)
- Parliament of Andalusia: 11 (out of 109)
- Website: www.dipujaen.com

The Province of Jaén (Spanish: Provincia de Jaén, Spanish pronunciation: [xaˈen]) is a province of southern Spain, in the eastern part of the autonomous community of Andalusia. It is bordered by the provinces of Ciudad Real, Albacete, Granada and Córdoba. Its capital is the city of Jaén.

It has a population of 618,143 in an area of 13,493.33 square kilometres (5,209.80 sq mi) across its 97 municipalities.

The highest point of the province is Pico Mágina (2165 m).

== History ==
One of the less-known provinces of Spain, compared to the tourist-oriented coast, it has four national parks and many other protected natural areas. The province also contains two Renaissance cities, Úbeda and Baeza, both recently declared World Heritage Sites by UNESCO. The province has among the highest concentration of castles in the world outside the Levant, thanks to its strategic position during the Reconquista. The annual chess tournament, held until 2010 in Linares, attracted many of the world's best players.

== Symbols ==
=== Flag ===
The flag of the province of Jaén was approved by the Provincial Council of Jaén, in the plenary session held on March 3, 2014, and registered in the Andalusian Registry of Local Entities, complying with Law 6/2003, of October 9 of Symbols, Processing and Registration of Andalusian Local Entities.

The flag is arranged in a rectangular cloth with a proportion of 1/1.5, being longer than it is wide. It has an area of 10×15 sectors, with the shield being three sectors high and eight sectors wide; and occupying six sectors high and five sectors wide. The flag is green Pantone color 377, in reference to the natural heritage of the province.

== Demographics ==
As of 2025, the population is 618,143, of which 49.5% are male, and 50.5% are female. Minors make up 15.9% of the population, and seniors make up 21.5%.

Historical population

Year	Pop.	±%
1842	246,558	—
1857	345,879	+40.3%
1877	403,441	+16.6%
1887	428,152	+6.1%
1900	469,881	+9.7%
1910	524,516	+11.6%
1920	590,570	+12.6%
1930	674,345	+14.2%
1940	760,847	+12.8%

Year	Pop.	±%
1950	781,228	+2.7%
1960	746,941	−4.4%
1970	668,206	−10.5%
1981	639,821	−4.2%
1991	637,633	−0.3%
2001	643,820	+1.0%
2011	667,484	+3.7%
2021	627,568	−6.0%

Source: INE

=== Immigration ===
As of 2025, immigrants make up 5.4% of the population. The 5 largest foreign countries of birth are Morocco, Colombia, Venezuela, Romania, and Peru.

== Economy ==
The province is the largest producer of olive oil in the world. It produces around 45% of all Spanish olive oil and 20% of the world's production. For this reason the province is also known as World Capital of Olive Oil. There are more than 66 million olive trees, spread over 550,000 hectares (1.4 million acres), producing more olive oil than the entire country of Italy.

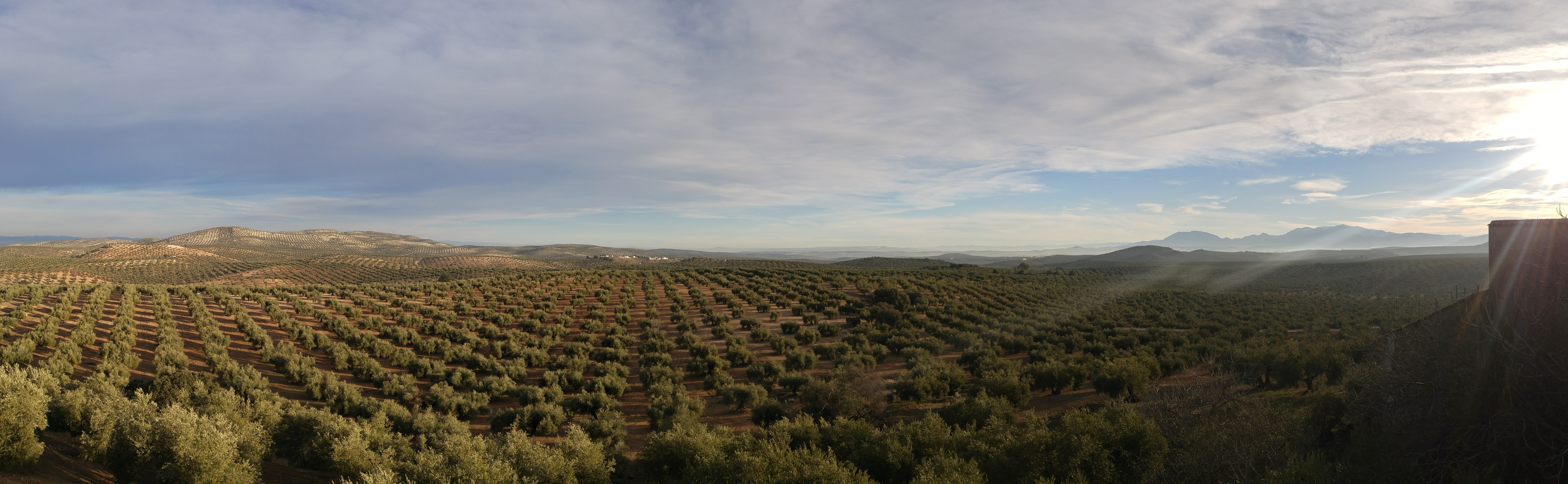
An olive grove in the north of the province

== See also ==
- List of municipalities in Jaén
- Timeline of Jaén, Spain
