= Comarca de Loja =

- Comarca
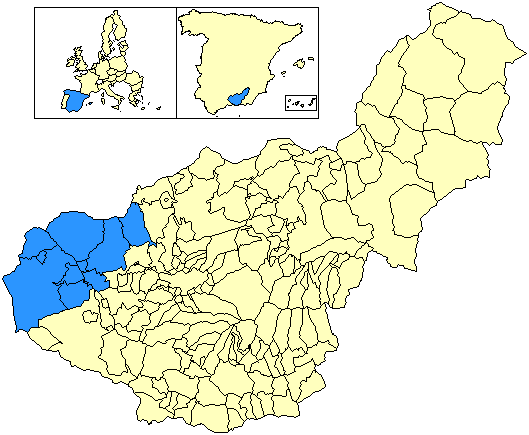
- Location of Loja in the province of Granada, Andalusia, Spain
- Coordinates: 37°28′56″N 3°25′50″W
- Country: Spain
- Autonomous community: Andalusia
- Province: Granada

Area
  - Total: 1,300.27 km^{2} (502.04 sq mi)

Population (2023) (Note: Estimate at 1 January 2023: National Statistics Institute (Spain))
  - Total: 61,155
  - Density: 47.033/km^{2} (121.81/sq mi)

Comarca de Loja is a comarca in the province of Granada, Spain.

It is made up of ten municipalities, of which the most populated and largest is Loja; on the other hand, the municipality with the lowest number of inhabitants is Zagra, and the smallest is Villanueva Mesía. Its traditional and historical capital is the city of Loja. This comarca was established in 2003 by the Government of Andalusia.

It consists of the following municipalities:

| Arms | Municipality | Area (km^{2}) | Population (2023) (Note: Estimate at 1 January 2023: National Statistics Institute (Spain)) | Density (/km^{2}) |
|---|---|---|---|---|
| | Algarinejo | 92.11 | 2,396 | 26.01 |
| | Huétor-Tájar | 39.94 | 10,673 | 267.23 |
| | Íllora | 197.43 | 9,951 | 50.40 |
| | Loja | 447.53 | 20,580 | 45.99 |
| | Moclín | 113.11 | 3,558 | 31.46 |
| | Montefrío | 253.92 | 5,376 | 21.17 |
| | Moraleda de Zafayona | 48.12 | 3,130 | 65.05 |
| | Salar | 85.6 | 2,617 | 30.57 |
| | Villanueva Mesía | 11.18 | 2,009 | 179.70 |
| | Zagra | 11.33 | 865 | 76.35 |
| | Total | 1,300.27 | 61,155 | 47.03 |
