= Júbar =

- Settlement
- Location within Spain
- Coordinates: 37°00′30″N 03°02′00″W
- Country: Spain
- Autonomous community: Andalusia
- Province: Granada
- Comarca: Alpujarra Granadina
- Municipality: Nevada
- Elevation: 1,185 m (3,888 ft)
- Population (2022): 28
- Time zone: UTC+1 (CET)
  - Summer (DST): UTC+2 (CEST)
- Postal code: 18494

Júbar (Spanish: [ˈxu.baɾ]) is a settlement in Andalusia, Spain, located within the municipality of Nevada, in the comarca (district) of Alpujarra Granadina, in the Province of Granada. In 2022, it was inhabited by 28 people.
