= Íllora =

- Municipality
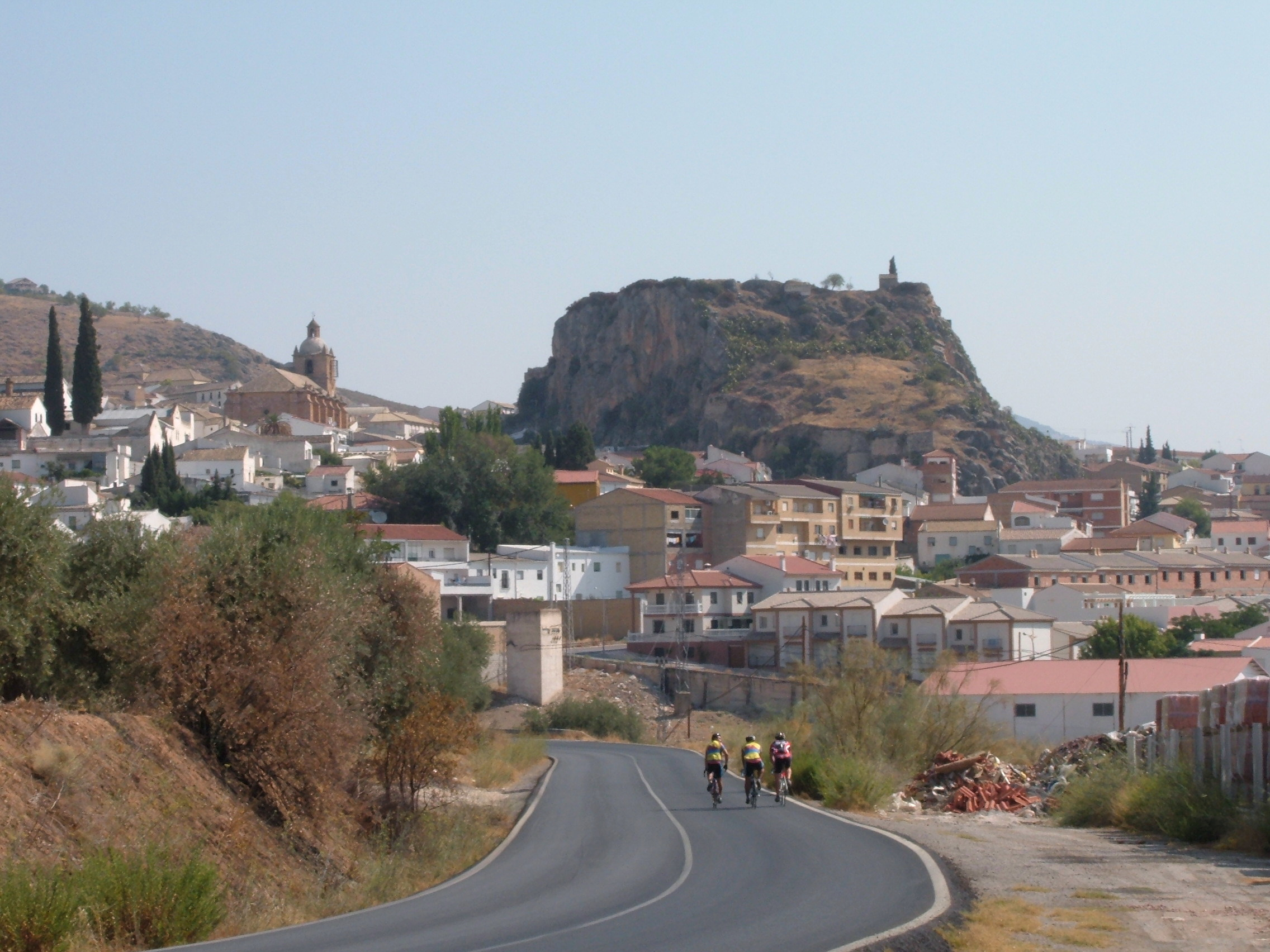
- Íllora

- Coat of arms

- Location in Spain
- Coordinates: 37°17′18″N 3°52′47″W
- Country: Spain
- Autonomous Community: Andalusia
- Province: Granada
- Comarca: Comarca de Loja

Government
  - Mayor: Antonio José Salazar Pérez (PSOE)

Area
  - Total: 197.4 km^{2} (76.2 sq mi)
- Elevation (AMSL): 759 m (2,490 ft)

Population (2025-01-01)
  - Total: 9,923
  - Density: 50.27/km^{2} (130.2/sq mi)
- Time zone: UTC+1 (CET)
  - Summer (DST): UTC+2 (CEST (GMT +2))
- Postal code: 18260
- Area code: +34 (Spain) + 958 (Granada)
- Website: www.illora.com

Íllora is a municipality in the province of Granada, located in Andalucia. Spain. It is surrounded by the following villages: Moclín, Pinos Puente, Valderrubio, Moraleda de Zafayona, Villanueva Mesía, Montefrío, and with the municipality of Alcalá la Real. The municipality consists of Íllora, Alomartes, Tocón, Escóznar, Obéilar- also known as La Estación de Íllora–, Brácana, Ventas de Algarra, Vallequemado and La Alhondiguilla.

The main source of income is the rural economy, especially the olives.

== Demography ==
Number of inhabitants in the past few years:

Demography evolution
2002	2003	2004	2005	2006	2007	2008	2009	2010	2011	2012	2013
10,288	10,130	10,072	10,210	10,304	10,390	10,399	10,440	10,386	10,346	10,716	10,638

== Toponymy ==
Íllora comes from the term “Illurco” or “Ilurco”, which according to Wilhelm von Humboldt seems to be of Basque origin or of some Pyrenean town before the Iberian and Celtic settlement. Hence, its name, “Ilurquense”. All historical references from the fifteenth century to the nineteenth century, showed the word “Yllora”, written with Y instead of be written with I.

== Symbols ==
Íllora's council traditionally comes using a shield based on Felipe's weapons since 1720, although its official approval does not appear. This symbol was adopted when the area passed into the hands of the royal state under his kingdom.

This shield includes the barracks of Castile and León, Aragón-Sicilia, Austria, Modern Burgundy, Old Burgundy, Brabant and Granada with the Borbón-Anjou shield and the collar of the Toisón de Oro's necklace.

As differential elements, there are some sort of agile heads in the upper corners, a star in the middle of the upper border and the inscriptions “Hillora” and “year D'VII” above and below the shield, respectively.

The mention of 507 is a doubt for historians, who consider that perhaps it is referred to the year in which the town's foundation took place. On the unusual place-name written with H, several hypotheses are also proposed, among which it stands out that the letter could have been added simply for the same number of letters and number of syllables.

== History ==
Some archaeological discoveries have been found in Íllora belonging to the prehistory, the Neolithic and mainly of the Copper Age. Towards the year 600 BC the Carthaginians landed in the Iberian Peninsula imposing their authority on the Phoenicians and, with a clever policy, consolidate the foundations of their empire, including Illurco.

With the arrival of the Romans the colonies settle in already existing villages. Of them, Plinio points out among the most celebrated of the interior to Illurco.

During the Muslim conquest there are few data on Íllora; nevertheless, it is deduced from the Christian chronicles that it must have been an important town with fortress and suburbs. Precisely in June 1319 infants Pedro and Juan of Castille seized the town of Íllora and its suburb when they went to devastate the Vega de Granada, and according to the Alfonso XI, if they had stayed another day they would also have taken his castle, although the infante Pedro did not want to stay there any longer, because his will was to besiege Granada and keep it surrounded «until they win it, or die on it», as recorded in the Grand Chronicle of the same king, although shortly after both infants died in the Disaster of the Fertile valley of Granada, happened the 25 of June 1319.

In June 1319, when the Vega de Granada was being devastated, the town of Íllora came into the possession of the infantes Pedro and Juan de Castilla. If they would have stayed one more day, affirms the Chronicle of Alfonso XI, they would have also taken its castle. The infante Pedro did not want to stay anymore, as his main ambition was to isolate Granada until they seized it. However, both infantes were killed in the valley of Granada disaster, which occurred 25 June 1319.

In the spring of 1486 King Ferdinand of Aragon resumed the war against Granada beginning with the place of the current Loja, whose surrender of the city was the key that would open the conquest of the fortress of Ilurquense. On June 8 of that same year the Catholic Monarchs conquered Íllora, who later named Gonzalo Fernández de Córdoba the Great Captain, as their first Christian warden, hence the name of the local school.

After the Reconquest, the manors did not reach similar dimensions to those of other areas of the country. Although they played an important role in the beginning of the new period, little by little it was disintegrating and losing presence in the configuration of the town. The access to the property was produced by the abandonment of the original Muslim owners, passing into Christian hands. Economically, this period will be based on subsistence agriculture, with wheat and barley constituting the population's food base.

During the first half of the nineteenth century Íllora will live a stage of stability that will be interrupted by the Napoleonic invasion and the subsequent War of Independence. The French provoked the rejection of the people, who supported the Grenadian uprising against Godoy in April, and even enlisted many people as soldiers against the French takeover of Granada. The region was in a situation of decadence due to the looting that the Napoleonic troops carried out.

With the return of King Fernando VII Íllora regained its economic and social impulse to be again altered negatively with the clashes between absolutists and realists, who will have in the passage of the General called Rafael Riego Montefrío and its support for certain sectors of the population of Íllora its contact element to subsequently suffer repression in the area. Before the uprising of Loja, the ilurquenses remained faithful to the authorities and even collaborated with the Army to capture fugitives from that city. Circumstance that will not be repeated in the democratic six-year term when Íllora will be added to it.

== Culture ==
=== Museums ===
- Pósito del Trigo – has a neoclassical style, built in 1738
- Molino – Alomartes' museum

=== Historical heritage ===
In the center of the village, at the top of a rock, there are the ruins of the old castle of Íllora, although there are hardly any remains of the walls. This castle dates from the Caliphate period (9th-10th centuries) and is structured in three areas: the villa, the citadel and the suburb. Associated to that castle, there are a series of optical towers, among which the Tower of Brácana stands out. In Tocón, there is another tower, in this case a farmhouse or rural castle. All of them are works from the Nasrid period.

Moreover, there are some towers: The Torre de Brácana, for example. In Tocón there is another tower which is a rural castle. All of them belong to the Nasrid period.

Illora, furthermore, counts with another important historical-artistic monument (which was declared an Asset of Cultural Interest in 1980) is the church called Nuestra Señora de la Encarnación designed by Diego de Siloé who is also known for building Granada's cathedral in the 16th century, with the intervention of some disciples like Juan de Maeda and Diego de Pesquera.

=== Music ===
The most important musical event which is celebrated in Illora is Parapanda Folk festival. It was declared to be of National Tourist Interest and takes place during the summer holidays, in the last week of July. It is performed by some national and international ethnic groups. This activity is considered to be culturally relevant.

=== Festivities ===
The local festival in honor to Saint Rogelio takes place on the third weekend of August. Even though the actual day of San Rogelio is 16 September- which is also a festive day in the village. The local faire is from the 8–12 October. A long time ago was considered to be one of the most important of all Spain. Easter is one of the most important weeks of the whole year culturally and religiously. Beginning with his proclamation, from Palm Sunday to Easter Sunday there are many events and celebrations scheduled by the Parish of the Incarnation and the four existing brotherhoods: the Patronal de San Rogelio, the Christ of Youth, the Our Father Jesus Nazareno and Maria Santísima de los Dolores, and the brotherhood of the Most Holy Christ of Veracruz.

== Sports ==
The Sports Union of Íllora (UD Íllora) is the main football team that the municipality has. His field is in the Sports Complex La Laguna. Since 2011, the Antonio García Football Field "El Calvo" has been a 2-star artificial turf (the maximum number of FIFAs is 5). The lower categories of that team are called UD Parapanda. There are also futsal teams, whose field is the municipal pavilion of Íllora.

There is an association called Gallipatos de Parapanda, which is dedicated to mountain biking and competitions.

== Gastronomy ==
Among the traditional cuisine, one of the main highlights is the conservation method for the food. The meat maintenaiment in olive oil is the principal way of cooking the well-known guisos. Some main dishes are the asparagus in sauce.

== Well-known figures ==
- Saint Rogelio (ninth century), monk and martyr.
- Juan Bautista Sánchez González (1893–1957), a soldier who fought in the War of Morocco and the Spanish Civil War. He became Captain *General of Aragon, the Balearic Islands and Catalonia.
- José Eduardo González Navas (1951), politician

== See also ==
- List of municipalities in Granada
