= Kingdom of Granada (Crown of Castile) =

1492–1833 territorial jurisdiction under the Crown of Castile

Coordinates: 37°14′N 3°15′W

Kingdom of Granada Reino de Granada (Spanish)
- 1492–1833
- Standard Coat of arms
- Motto: Reinar es agridulce ("Reigning is bittersweet")
- Kingdom of Granada
- Capital: Granada
- Religion: Catholicism
- Government: Manorialism
- History
  - Conquest of Granada: 1492
  - Morisco Revolt: 1568–1571
  - Territorial division of Spain: 1833
Preceded by
Emirate of Granada
Succeeded by
Province of Almería
Province of Cádiz
Province of Granada
Province of Jaén (Spain)
Province of Málaga
- Today part of: Spain

The Kingdom of Granada (/ɡrəˈnɑːdə/; Spanish: Reino de Granada) was a territorial jurisdiction of the Crown of Castile from the conclusion of the Reconquista in 1492 until Javier de Burgos' provincial division of Spain in 1833. This was a "kingdom" ("reino") in the second sense given by the Diccionario de la lengua española de la Real Academia Española: the Crown of Castile consisted of several such kingdoms. Its extent is detailed in Gelo del Cabildo's 1751 Respuestas Generales del Catastro de Ensenada (1750–54), which was part of the documentation of a census. Like the other kingdoms within Spain, the Kingdom of Granada was abolished by the 1833 territorial division.

After the Granada War ended 2 January 1492, the old Muslim-ruled Emirate of Granada became part of the Crown of Castile. The kingdom was the location of a Muslim rebellion in 1499-1501 and after the Muslims were defeated and forcibly converted, a Morisco rebellion in 1568–1571. Following the annexation, The city of Granada, which had been the last center of Muslim power in the Iberian Peninsula, lost its political importance and even much of its economic importance, and entered a long period of decline. The European discovery of America gave preeminence to Seville, the only important inland port, which by the 16th century had become the principal city not only of Andalusia, but of all Spain. Nonetheless, Granada continued to play a significant institutional role: it was one of the seventeen cities with a vote in the Cortes de Castilla, the Granada Cathedral was the seat of an archdiocese and the Royal Chancery of Granada was the highest judicial court for half of the Crown of Castile, equaled only by a corresponding institution in Valladolid.

The difficulties of religious and ethnic integration of the Moriscos (former Muslims who had converted to Christianity) with the now-dominant Old Christians resulted in the unsuccessful, harshly repressed Morisco Revolt of 1568–1571. The Moriscos were initially dispersed in the Castilian interior, then expelled outright from Spain in 1609.

Today, all the territory of the Kingdom of Granada is part of the territory of the autonomous community of Andalusia.

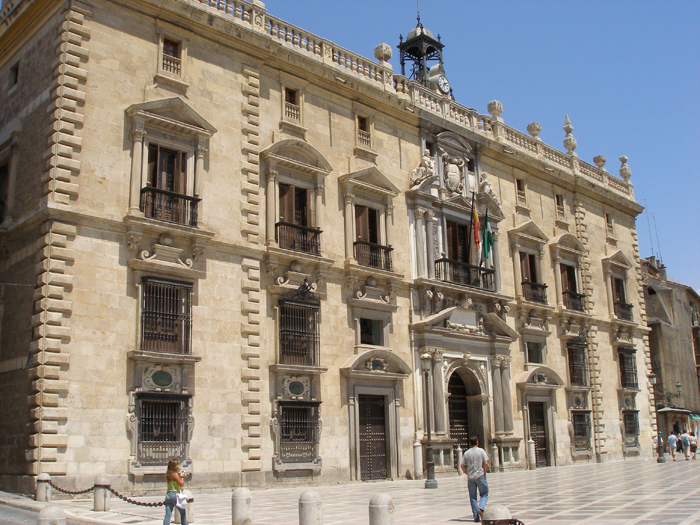
Royal Chancery of Granada.

== Coat of arms ==
The heraldry of Granada was employed as a personal device by Henry IV of Castile before the conquest of Granada, in the form of two fruited pomegranate branches, known as a granada in Spanish, with the motto reinar es agridulce ("reigning is bittersweet"). It was later incorporated into the coats of arms used by the Catholic Monarchs and their descendants. From 1475, the monarchs of Castile called themselves also monarchs of Granada, but it was not until 1492 that their military might made the title more than a boast. In 1497, a new coin, the excelente de granada, featured the coat of arms of the Kingdom of Granada. This heraldic figure became part of Spain's national coat of arms.

== See also ==
- es:Anexo:Localidades del Reino de Granada, a list of the localities that composed the Kingdom of Granada, according to the Catastro of Ensenada (1750–54); this page is an appendix to the Spanish-language Wikipedia.
- Historical configuration of the province of Granada
