= Comarca de Baza =

- Comarca
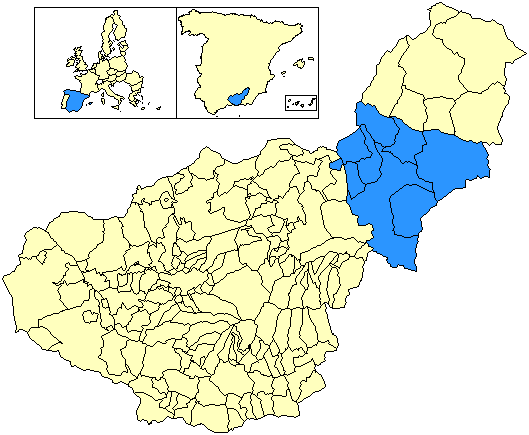
- Location of Comarca de Baza in the province of Granada
- Coordinates: 37°33′21″N 2°46′38″W
- Country: Spain
- Autonomous community: Andalusia
- Province: Granada

Area
  - Total: 1,731 km^{2} (668 sq mi)

Population (2024) (Note: Estimate at 1 January 2024: National Statistics Institute (Spain))
  - Total: 37,763
  - Density: 21.82/km^{2} (56.50/sq mi)

Comarca de Baza is a comarca in the province of Granada, Spain. This comarca was established in 2003 by the Government of Andalusia.

== Municipalities ==
It contains the following municipalities:

Arms	Municipality	Area (km^{2})	Population (2024) (Note: Estimate at 1 January 2024: National Statistics Institute (Spain))	Density (/km^{2})
	Baza	545.0	20,562	37.7
	Benamaurel	127.4	2,246	17.6
	Caniles	216.8	3,906	18.0
	Cortes de Baza	140.6	1,793	12.8
	Cuevas del Campo	96.6	1,775	18.4
	Cúllar	427.7	3,936	9.2
	Freila	74.5	922	12.4
	Zújar	102.1	2,623	25.7
	Total	1731.0	37,763	21.8
