= Játar =

- Municipality
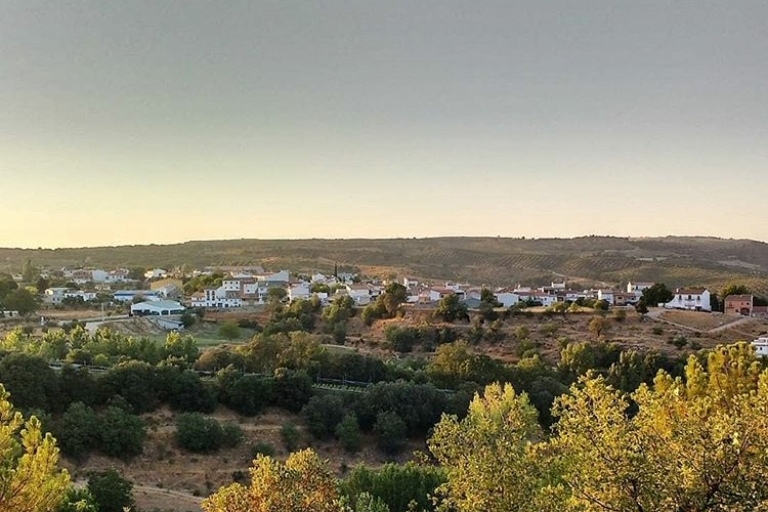

- Flag Coat of arms

- Location of Játar Játar (Spain)
- Coordinates: 36°56′05″N 3°54′36″W
- Country: Spain
- Province: Granada
- Comarca: Alhama
- Judicial district: Loja

Government
  - Mayor: Alexander van Oepen (PSOE)

Area
  - Total: 9.57 km^{2} (3.69 sq mi)
- Elevation: 962 m (3,156 ft)

Population (2025-01-01)
  - Total: 631
  - Density: 65.9/km^{2} (171/sq mi)
- Demonym(s): jatareño, -ña
- Postal code: 18127
- Website: Official website

Játar is a municipality in the province of Granada, Spain. As of 2019, it had a population of 614 inhabitants.

== See also ==
- List of municipalities in Granada
