= Jorairatar =

Coordinates: 36°55′33″N 3°06′27″W

Jorairátar is a village of the Southern Alpujarras in the autonomous community of Andalusia, Spain. It is located within the municipality of Ugíjar in the Province of Granada.
