= Fornes, Granada =

Fornes
- Municipality
- Flag Coat of arms

- Location of Fornes Fornes (Spain)
- Coordinates: 36°57′16″N 3°51′19″W
- Country: Spain
- Province: Granada
- Comarca: Alhama
- Judicial district: Loja

Government
  - Mayor: Ana Belén Fernández Navas (PSOE)

Area
  - Total: 16.29 km^{2} (6.29 sq mi)
- Elevation: 856 m (2,808 ft)

Population (2025-01-01)
  - Total: 526
  - Density: 32.3/km^{2} (83.6/sq mi)
- Demonym(s): forneño, -ña
- Postal code: 18127

Fornes is a municipality in the province of Granada, Spain. As of 2019, it had a population of 555 inhabitants.

== See also ==
- List of municipalities in Granada
