= Montillana =

Coordinates: 37°30′N 3°40′W

- Flag Coat of arms

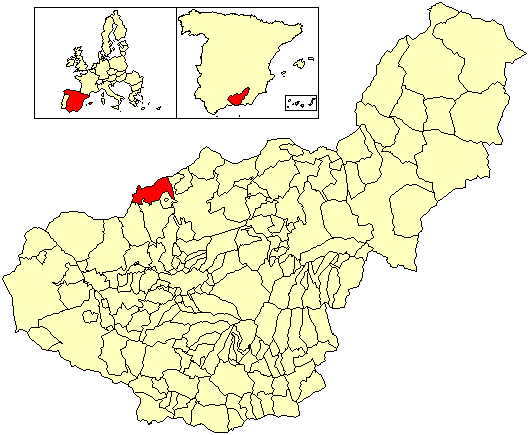

- Location in Spain.
- Country: Spain
- Autonomous community: Andalusia
- Province: Granada

Area
  - Total: 75.17 km^{2} (29.02 sq mi)
- Elevation: 1,022 m (3,353 ft)

Population (2025-01-01)
  - Total: 1,054
  - Density: 14.02/km^{2} (36.32/sq mi)
- Time zone: UTC+1 (CET)
  - Summer (DST): UTC+2 (CEST)
- Website: www.montillana.es

Montillana is a municipality in the province of Granada, Spain. As of 2010, it has a population of 1360 inhabitants.

== See also ==
- List of municipalities in Granada
