= Los Guájares =

Coordinates: 36°50′N 3°40′W

- Flag Coat of arms

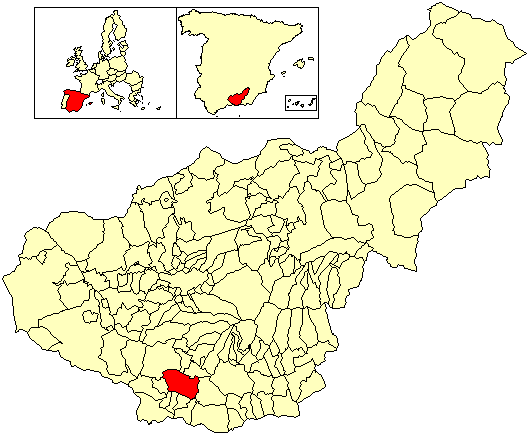

- Location in Spain.
- Country: Spain
- Autonomous community: Andalusia
- Province: Granada

Area
  - Total: 89 km^{2} (34 sq mi)
- Elevation: 280 m (920 ft)

Population (2025-01-01)
  - Total: 1,081
  - Density: 12/km^{2} (31/sq mi)
- Time zone: UTC+1 (CET)
  - Summer (DST): UTC+2 (CEST)
- Website: www.losguajares.es

Los Guájares is a municipality in the province of Granada, Spain. As of 2010, it has a population of 1191 inhabitants.

== See also ==
- List of municipalities in Granada
