= Ugíjar =

Ugíjar, Spain
- city
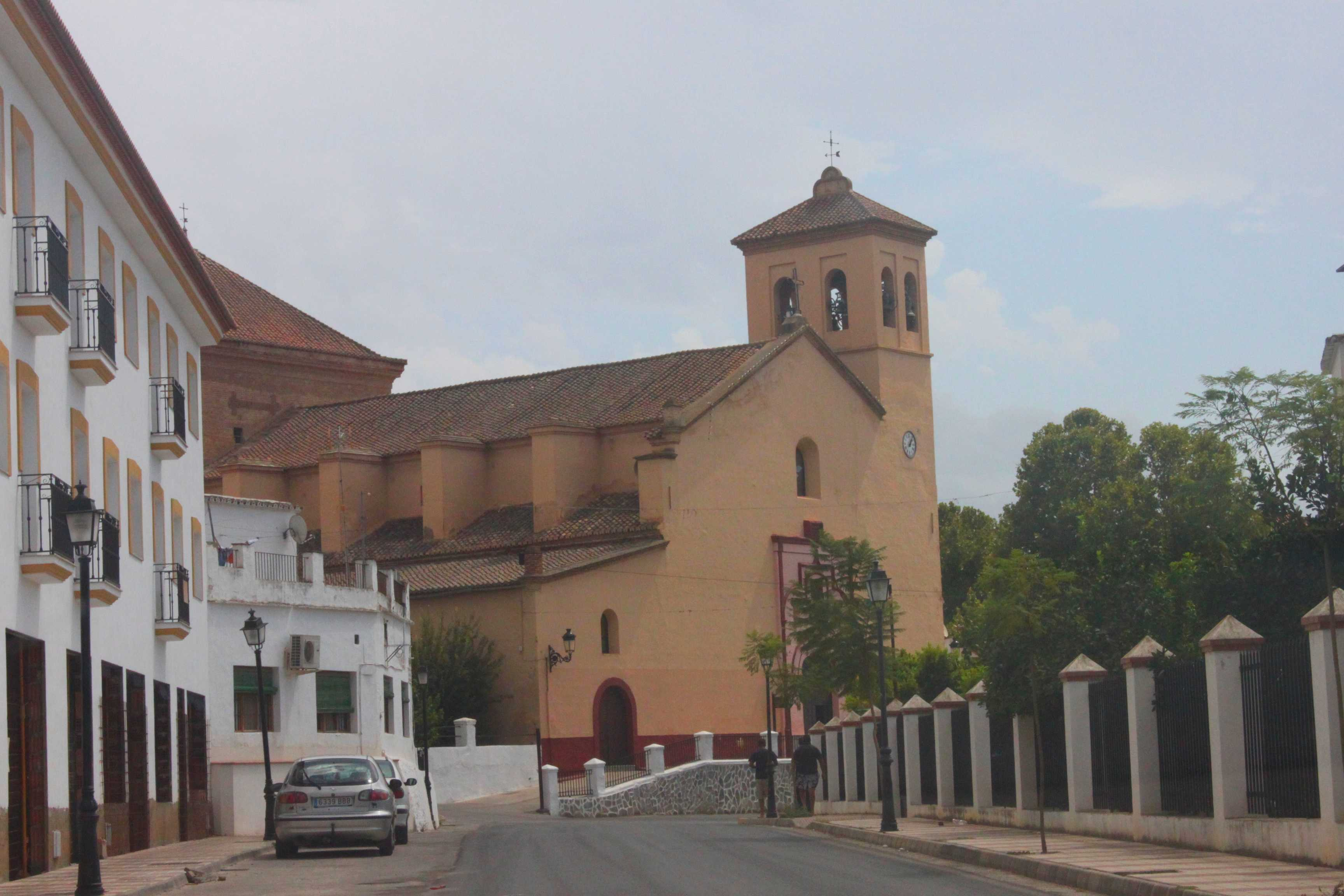
- The church of Ugíjar

- Coat of arms

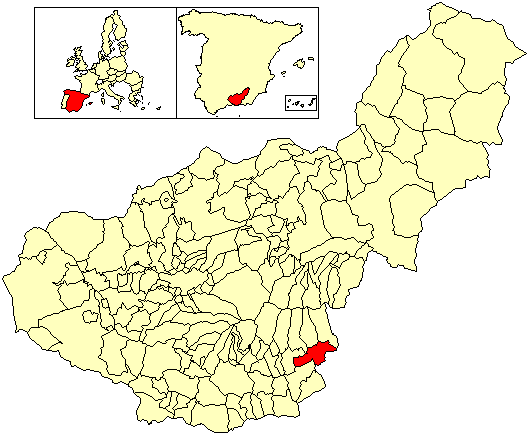
- Location of Ugíjar
- Coordinates: 36°58′N 3°03′W
- Country: Spain
- Province: Granada
- Municipality: Ugíjar

Area
  - Total: 67 km^{2} (26 sq mi)
- Elevation: 559 m (1,834 ft)

Population (2025-01-01)
  - Total: 2,574
  - Density: 38/km^{2} (100/sq mi)
- Time zone: UTC+1 (CET)
  - Summer (DST): UTC+2 (CEST)

Ugíjar is a municipality located in the province of Granada, Spain. According to the 2005 census (INE), the city has a population of 2524 inhabitants. Historically, it was a Moorish village.

== Populated places ==
- Cherín
- Jorairatar
- Las Canteras
- Los Montoros

== See also ==
- List of municipalities in Granada
