= Fonelas =

Coordinates: 37°25′N 3°10′W

Fonelas, Spain
- city
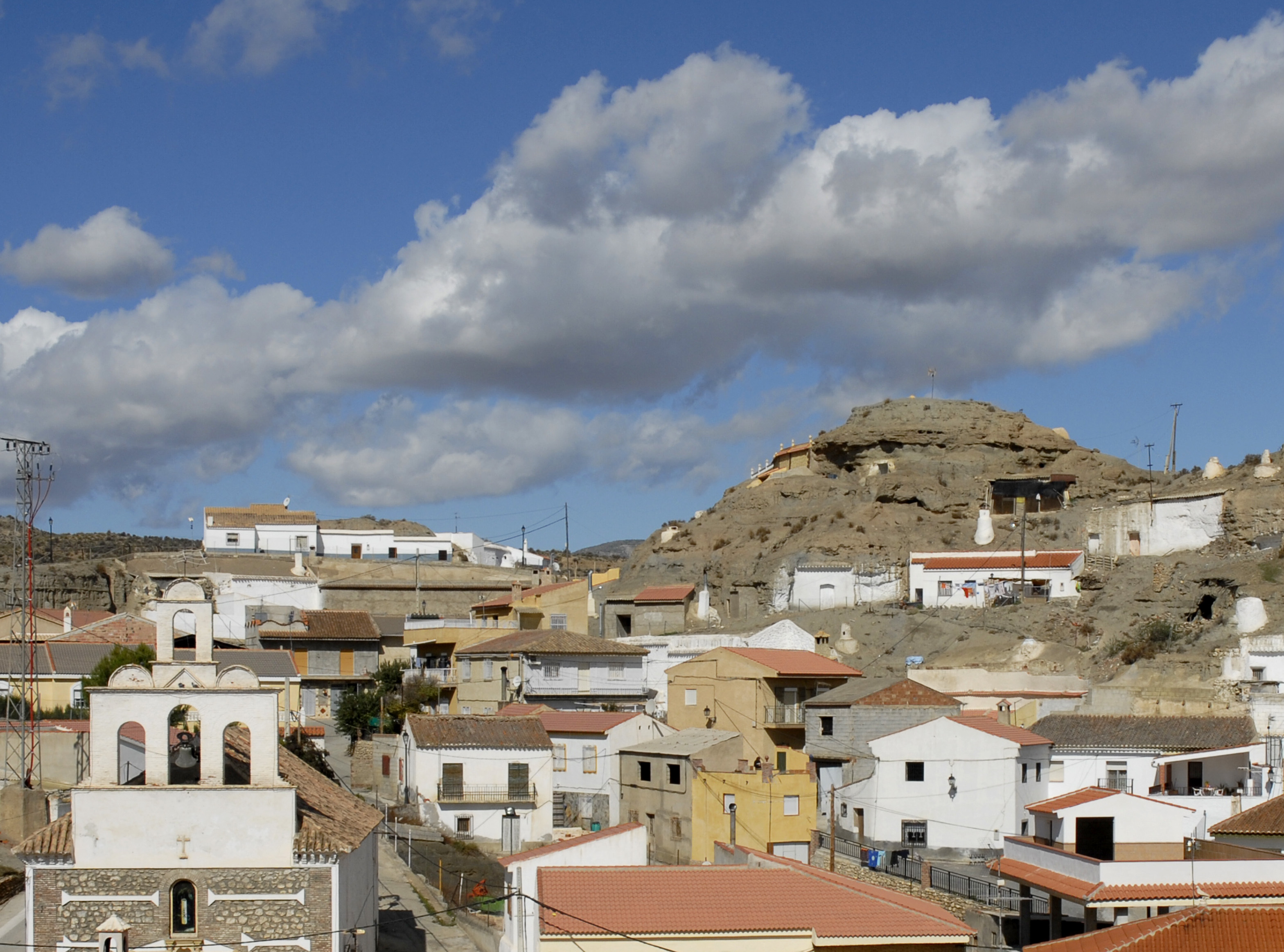

- Flag Coat of arms

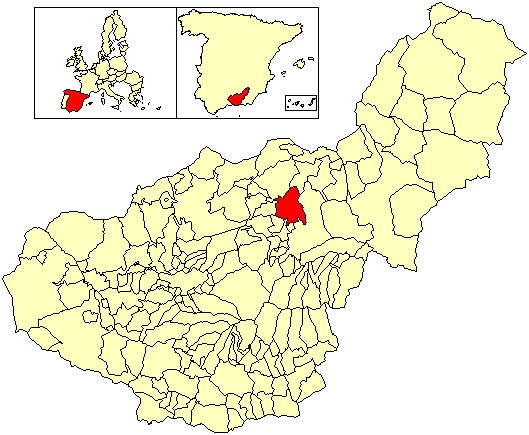
- Location of Fonelas
- Country: Spain
- Province: Granada
- Municipality: Fonelas

Area
  - Total: 96 km^{2} (37 sq mi)
- Elevation: 810 m (2,660 ft)

Population (2025-01-01)
  - Total: 965
  - Density: 10/km^{2} (26/sq mi)
- Time zone: UTC+1 (CET)
  - Summer (DST): UTC+2 (CEST)

Fonelas is a municipality located in the province of Granada, Spain. According to the 2006 census (INE), the town has a population of 1145 inhabitants.

== See also ==
- List of municipalities in Granada
