= Pedro Martínez, Granada =

Pedro Martínez
- Municipality
- Coat of arms

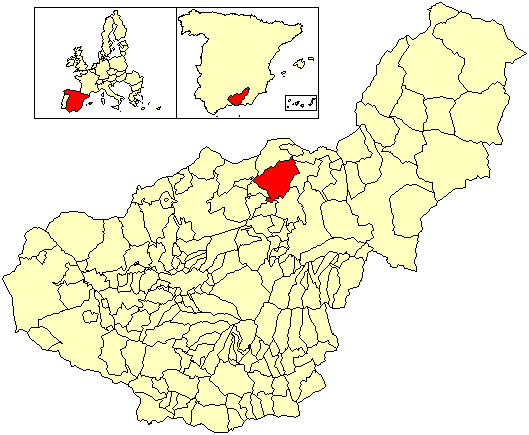
- Location of Pedro Martínez

- Location in Spain
- Coordinates: 37°30′N 3°13′W
- Country: Spain
- Autonomous community: Andalusia
- Province: Granada
- Comarca: Los Montes
- Judicial district: Guadix

Government
  - Alcalde: Blas Julián Lozano Cazorla (2007) (PSOE)
- Elevation: 1,035 m (3,396 ft)

Population (2025-01-01)
  - Total: 1,166
- Demonym(s): Pedromartinero, -ra
- Time zone: UTC+1 (CET)
  - Summer (DST): UTC+2 (CEST)
- Postal code: 18530
- Dialing code: (34)958
- Official language(s): Spanish
- Website: Official website

Pedro Martínez is a municipality located in the province of Granada, in Spain. As of 2002, Pedro Martínez had a population of 1,232.

== See also ==
- List of municipalities in Granada
