= Felipe Bauzá =

Spanish naval officer

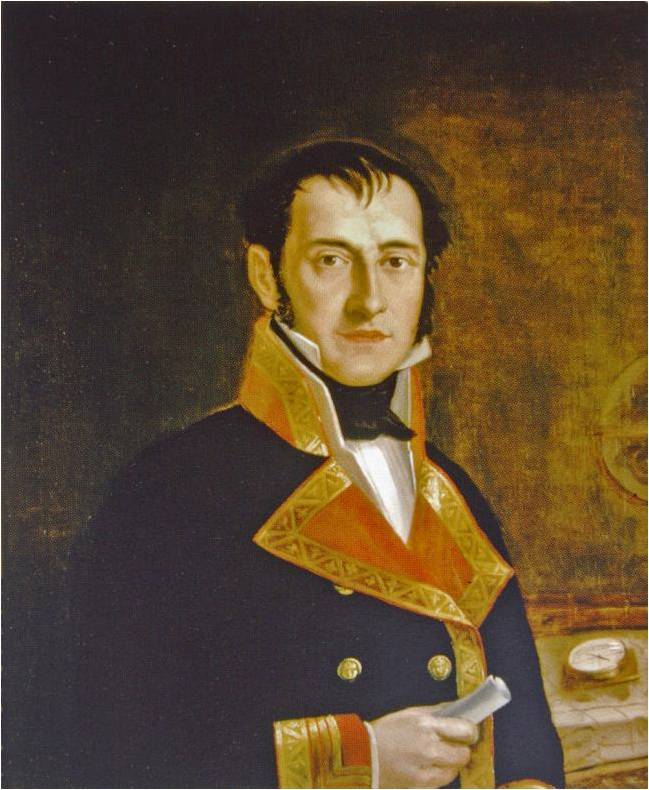
- Portrait of Felipe Bauzá, 1800, Museo Naval de Madrid (Naval Museum of Madrid)

Felipe Bauzá y Cañas (1764 in Palma de Mallorca – 1834 in London) was a Spanish naval officer, hydrographer, and cartographer.

== Biography ==
He was born on 17 February 1764 in Palma de Mallorca. He studied at the nautical college of Cartagena, Spain and qualified as a maritime pilot. In 1785 he started training as a hydrographer under cartographer Vincente Tofino, whom he helped chart the Mediterranean coastline of Spain.

He was the main cartographer of the Malaspina Expedition to the Americas, Oceania and Australasia between 1789 and 1794, and Bauza Island in New Zealand is named after him. At the end of that expedition he travelled across South America by land and created a map of the Andes.

In 1797 he started working at the Hydrography Office in Madrid, of which he became director in 1815. He was highly esteemed as a cartographer, both by the Spanish government and by foreign authorities. He was honoured with the Russian Cross of St Vladimir in 1816 and was elected a Foreign Member of the Royal Society of London in 1819.

He was deputy for Mallorca at the Cortes Generales during the Trienio Liberal ("Three Liberal Years") of 1820–1823. In 1823 due to the renewed persecution of liberals by King Ferdinand VII of Spain, Bauzá was sentenced to death and had to flee to London with his son, while his wife and daughter remained in Madrid. He took with him his large collection of geographical documents and maps of the Americas and Spain. In London he had contacts with many prominent English and European scientists, and sold many of his charts to the British Hydrographic Office.

In 1833 his death sentence was vacated. He was planning to return to Spain, but died of a brain haemorrhage on 3 March 1834.

The British Library holds a collection of his maps as the Bauzá Collection.
