= Morelábor =

Coordinates: 37°25′N 3°18′W

- Flag Coat of arms

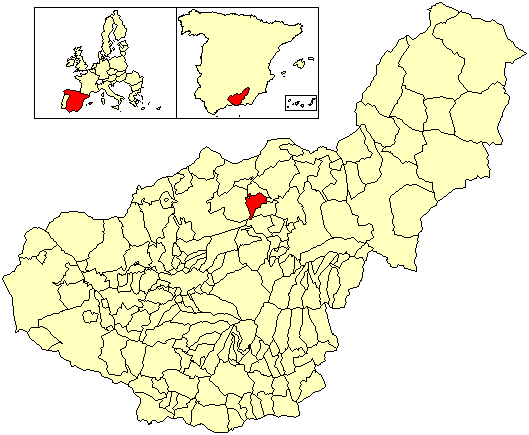

- Location in Spain.
- Country: Spain
- Autonomous community: Andalusia
- Province: Granada

Area
  - Total: 38.56 km^{2} (14.89 sq mi)
- Elevation: 1,090 m (3,580 ft)

Population (2025-01-01)
  - Total: 588
  - Density: 15.2/km^{2} (39.5/sq mi)
- Time zone: UTC+1 (CET)
  - Summer (DST): UTC+2 (CEST)
- Website: www.morelabor.es

Morelábor is a municipality in the province of Granada, Spain. As of 2010, it has a population of 737 inhabitants.

== See also ==
- List of municipalities in Granada
