= Dehesas Viejas =

- Municipality
- Flag Coat of arms

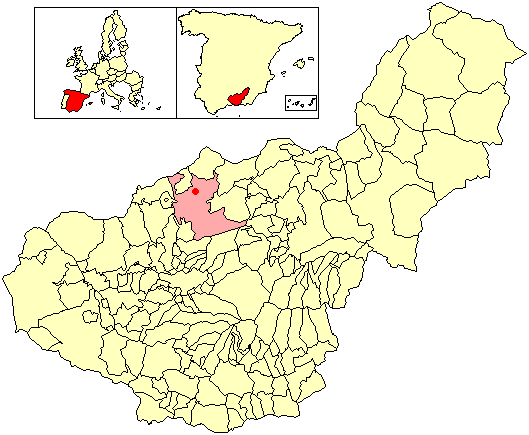
- Location of Dehesas Viejas

- Location in Spain
- Coordinates: 37°28′25″N 3°33′07″W
- Country: Spain
- Province: Granada
- Comarca: Los Montes
- Judicial district: Granada

Government
  - Mayor: Emilio (PSOE)

Area
  - Total: 13.72 km^{2} (5.30 sq mi)
- Elevation: 812 m (2,664 ft)

Population (2025-01-01)
  - Total: 635
  - Density: 46.3/km^{2} (120/sq mi)
- Demonym(s): izaviejero/a, desavejeño/a or dehesero/a
- Postal code: 18567
- Website: Official website

Dehesas Viejas is a municipality in the province of Granada, Spain. As of 2013, it had a population of 772 inhabitants.

== See also ==
- List of municipalities in Granada
