= Zagra, Granada =

Coordinates: 37°15′N 4°10′W

Zagra
- city
- Flag Coat of arms

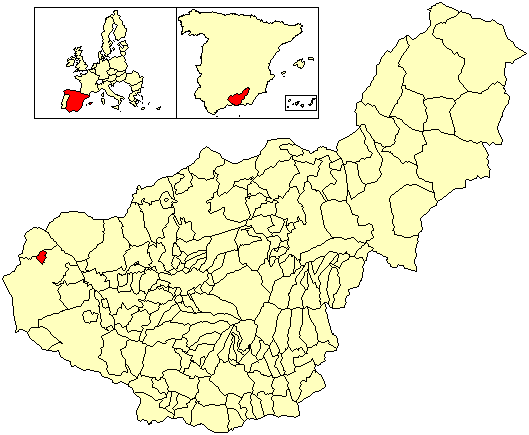
- Location of Zagra
- Country: Spain
- Province: Granada
- Municipality: Zagra

Area
  - Total: 11 km^{2} (4.2 sq mi)
- Elevation: 682 m (2,238 ft)

Population (2025-01-01)
  - Total: 845
  - Density: 77/km^{2} (200/sq mi)
- Time zone: UTC+1 (CET)
  - Summer (DST): UTC+2 (CEST)

Zagra is a municipality located in the province of Granada, Spain.

== Economy ==
Zagra is a largely arable town where farming is the main economic activity. Crops grown include tomatoes, apples, and meat is also produced here, as well as milk.

Farms are small independent ones that are family-run.

== Population ==
According to the 2004 census (INE), the city has a population of 1094 inhabitants.

== See also ==
- List of municipalities in Granada
