= Nevada, Spain =

Coordinates: 37°00′N 3°01′W

Nevada
- Flag Coat of arms

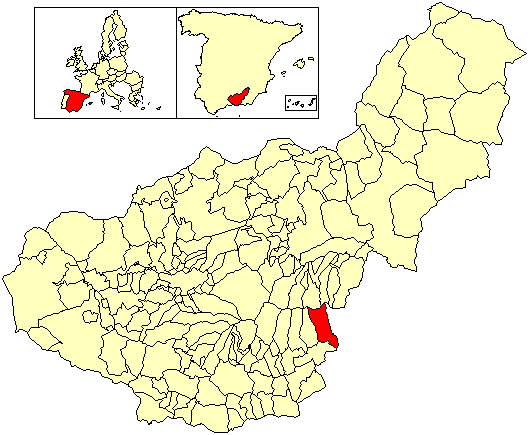

- Location in Spain.
- Country: Spain
- Autonomous community: Andalusia
- Province: Granada

Area
  - Total: 77.31 km^{2} (29.85 sq mi)
- Elevation: 1,082 m (3,550 ft)

Population (2025-01-01)
  - Total: 1,086
  - Density: 14.05/km^{2} (36.38/sq mi)
- Time zone: UTC+1 (CET)
  - Summer (DST): UTC+2 (CEST)
- Website: www.nevada.es

Nevada is a municipality in the province of Granada, Spain. As of 2010, it has a population of 1,179 inhabitants.

== See also ==
- List of municipalities in Granada
