= Algarinejo =

Algarinejo, Spain
- Flag Coat of arms

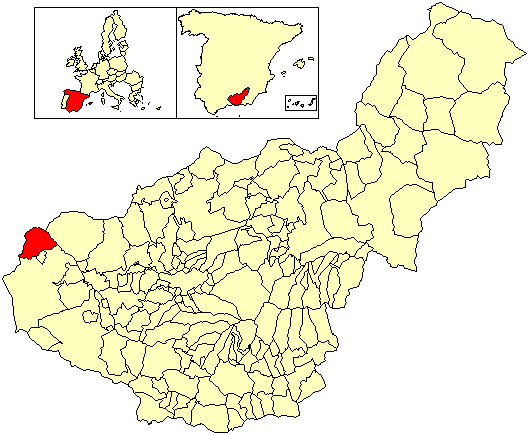
- Location of Algarinejo
- Coordinates: 37°19′N 4°09′W
- Country: Spain
- Province: Granada
- Municipality: Algarinejo

Area
  - Total: 93 km^{2} (36 sq mi)
- Elevation: 602 m (1,975 ft)

Population (2025-01-01)
  - Total: 2,335
  - Density: 25/km^{2} (65/sq mi)
- Time zone: UTC+1 (CET)
  - Summer (DST): UTC+2 (CEST)

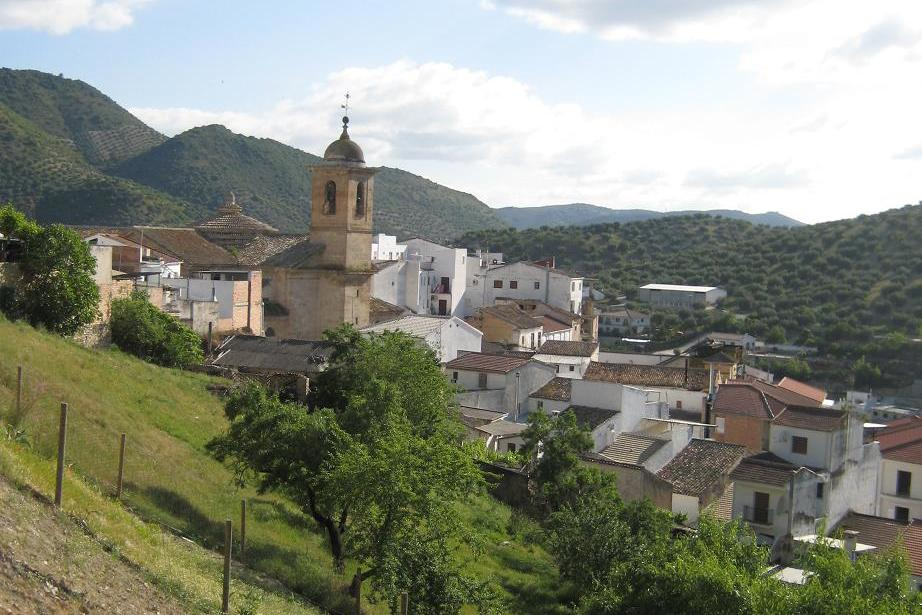
A view of Algarinejo (2009)

Algarinejo is a city located in the province of Granada, Spain. According to the 2005 census (INE), the city had a population of 4,184 inhabitants. The city is located by the Pesquería River.

The name "Algarinejo" presumably originates from the Arabic word "al-gar", meaning "the cave".

== See also ==
- List of municipalities in Granada
