= Cuevas del Campo =

Cuevas del Campo, Spain
- city
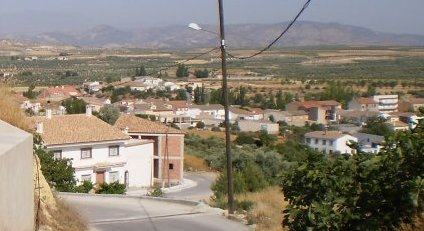
- Cuevas del Campo

- Flag Coat of arms

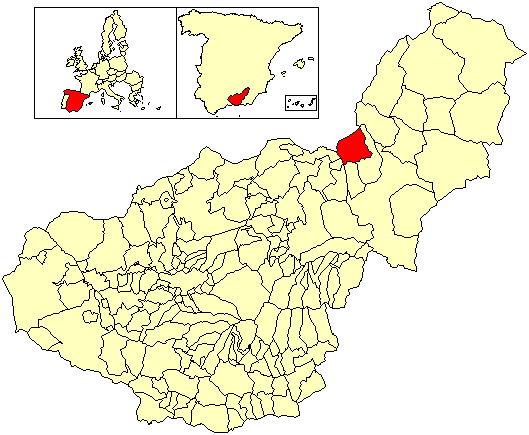
- Location of Cuevas del Campo
- Coordinates: 37°36′N 2°46′W
- Country: Spain
- Province: Granada
- Municipality: Cuevas del Campo

Area
  - Total: 97 km^{2} (37 sq mi)
- Elevation: 855 m (2,805 ft)

Population (2025-01-01)
  - Total: 1,841
  - Density: 19/km^{2} (49/sq mi)
- Time zone: UTC+1 (CET)
  - Summer (DST): UTC+2 (CEST)

Cuevas del Campo is a municipality located in the province of Granada, Spain. According to the 2006 census (INE), the city has a population of 2073 inhabitants. In the north east corner of the Granada Province and at around 130 kilometres from Granada City (home of the Alhambra), Cuevas del Campo is one of the six picturesque villages that make up the area of Baza in the Altiplano region. It covers 97 km2 and has a population of approximately 2,500.

It lies in between the Sierra de Baza and the Sierra de Cazorla.

Cuevas del Campo is the youngest of the municipalities in the Baza region, having been formed in 1980. The population is approximately 2,500 and the inhabitants are known as ’cueveños’. The village economy is basically agricultural, with a strong emphasis on olives.

== History ==
Over many years there have been disputes between the towns of Pozo Alcón (Jaén Province) and Zújar (Granada Province) regarding the boundaries of these two municipalities. The result of a long legal wrangle ended up with the dividing of the territory into three parts, one of which was El Retamar (which is now Cuevas del Campo). Over 30 years the people of Cuevas del Campo wanted segregation from Zújar (which is situated some 20 kilometres away). This was finally granted on 21 November 1980, when Cuevas del Campo finally became an independently constituted municipality.

== Climate ==
As with the other villages in the Altiplano area the summers are long and dry, with cooler evenings than many other parts of Andalusia. The winters can bring cold days and occasional snow, but often coupled with bright sunshine.

== Fiestas ==
On the 15h and 16 May there is a festival in honour of San Isidro. At the beginning of October is the Fiesta of the Santo Angel.

== See also ==
- List of municipalities in Granada
