= Royal Chancellery of Granada =

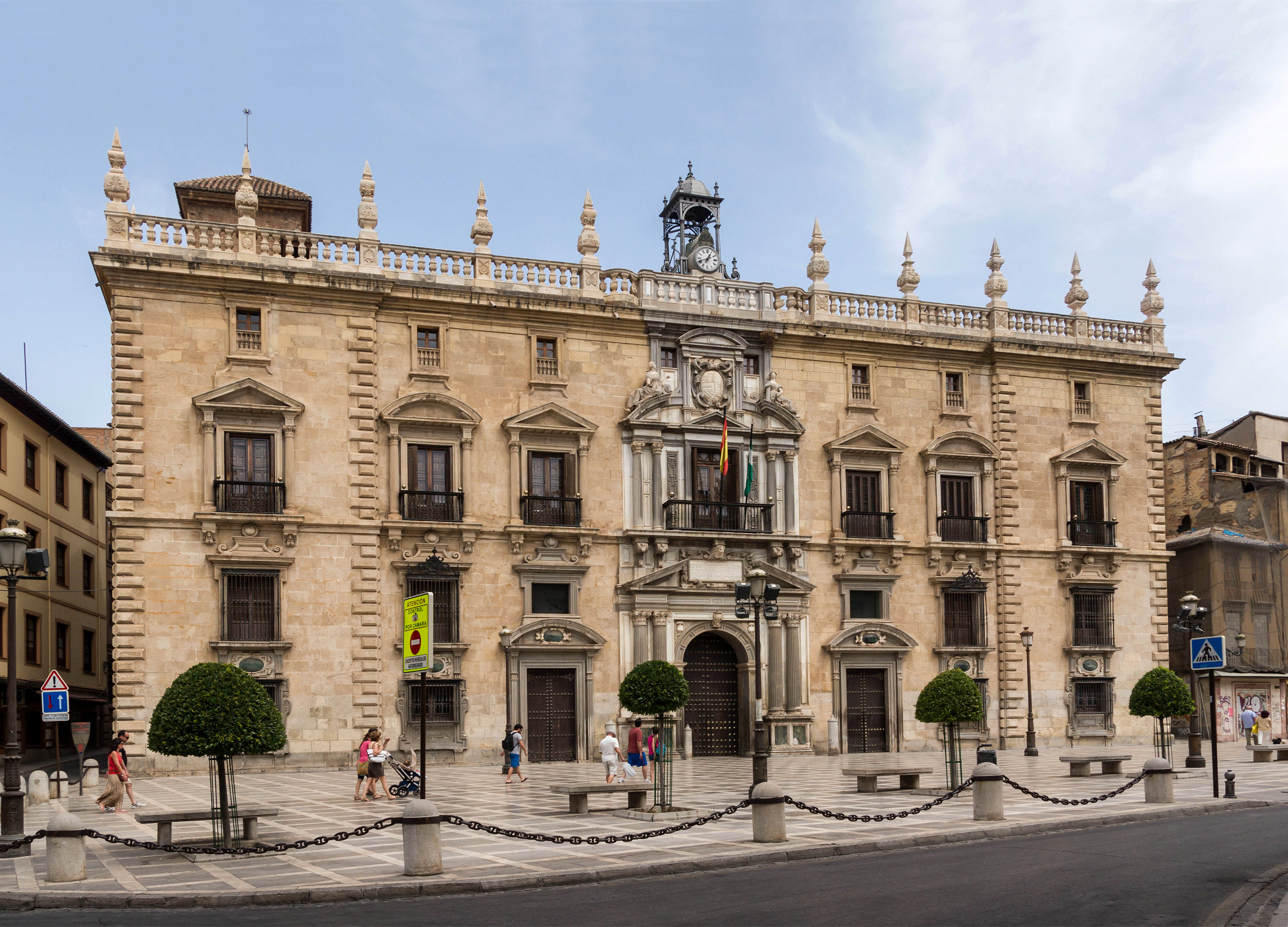
The Palacio de la Chancillería, in which the Chancellery was housed.

The Royal Chancellery of Granada (Spanish - La Real Chancillería de Granada or Real Audiencia y Chancillería de Granada) was a court established by Isabel I of Castile in 1505 when she moved the Royal Audience and Chancellery of Ciudad Real (Real Audiencia y Chancillería de Ciudad Real) to Granada - it had originally been set up in Ciudad Real in 1494.
It was abolished in 1834 with the rise of liberalism in Spain.
