= Loja, Granada =

Loja
- Municipality
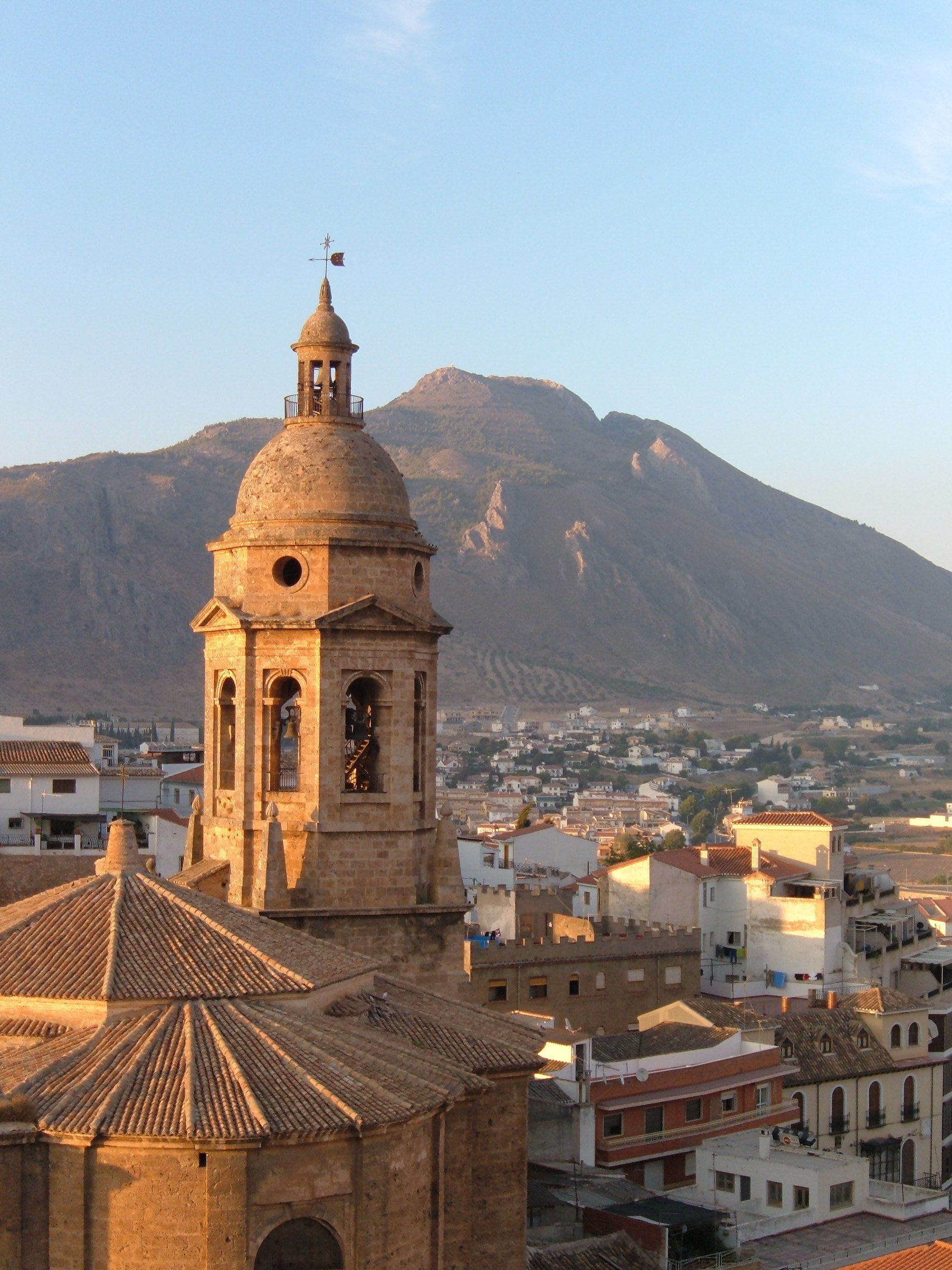
- Bell Tower of the Church of the Incarnation.

- Flag Coat of arms
- Nickname: Flower among thorns
- Location in the Province of Granada Location in Andalusia Location in Spain
- Coordinates: 37°10′N 04°9′W
- Country: Spain
- Autonomous community: Andalusia
- Province: Granada
- Comarca: Loja
- Judicial district: Loja
- Founded: 9th century BC

Government
  - Mayor: Francisco Joaquín Camacho Borrego (2011) (PP)

Area
  - Total: 447.29 km^{2} (172.70 sq mi)
- Elevation: 448 m (1,470 ft)

Population (2025-01-01)
  - Total: 20,951
  - Density: 46.840/km^{2} (121.31/sq mi)
- Demonym: Lojeños
- Time zone: UTC+1 (CET)
  - Summer (DST): UTC+2 (CEST)
- Postal code: 18300
- Website: www.aytoloja.org

Loja (Spanish pronunciation: [ˈloxa]; locally also [ˈlohɐ, ˈloɐ]), formerly Loxa, is a town in southern Spain, situated at the western limit of the province of Granada. It is in the valley of the River Genil, overlooked by the so-called Sierra de Loja, of which the highest peak, Sierra Gorda, stands 1,671 metres above sea-level.

== History ==
Loja has sometimes been identified with the ancient Ilipula, or with the Lacibi (Lacibis) of Pliny and Ptolemy. It is unknown when Loja was first captured by the Moors; most likely this happened in the 8th century. It first clearly emerges in the Arab chronicles of the year 890. Back then, it was also likely to be named as Lūsha.

=== Reconquista ===
It was taken by Ferdinand III of Castile in 1226, but was soon afterwards abandoned.

As part of the Granada War, Loja was attacked in 1486 by Christian forces under Ferdinand and Isabella. These soldiers included some Englishmen commanded by Sir Edward Woodville. The victorious Spanish allowed the Muslim population to leave for Granada. The town's Moorish name, Medina Lawša, was changed to Lauxa. Isabella called it the "flower among thorns". In 1491 work began on the Church of the Incarnation on the site of the town's main mosque.

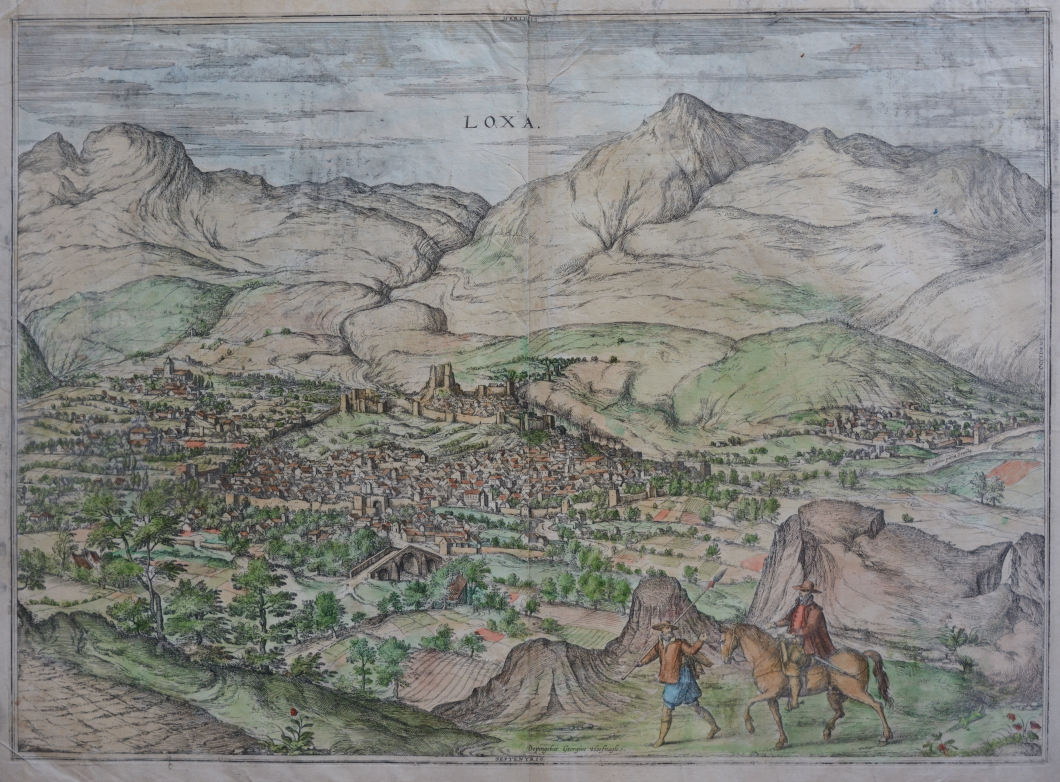
Loxa

=== 19th century ===
The town was the centre of the Loja uprising in 1861, led by local Rafael Pérez del Álamo, that was quickly suppressed.

== Transport ==
In the 1870s a railway line was laid linking Bobadilla and Granada. The line has been adapted to enable high-speed AVE trains to reach Granada, but the nature of the route still prevents them from running at full speed. As at 2025 a new high-speed route through Loja is being built. This new track (the variante de Loja) will improve journey times between Madrid and Granada as well as forming a component of the "Mediterranean Corridor" route between Antequera and Almería.

== Main sights ==
The town's Islamic heritage is still evident in the quarter of the Alcazaba, a Moorish fortress of which most of the walls and towers remain.

Other sights include:

- Convent of Santa Clara (16th century)
- Convento of St. Francis of Assisi, including a 16th-century cloister
- Church of the Incarnation, the main church which was begun in Mudéjar style at the end of the 15th century
- Church of San Gabriel (16th century)
- Church of Santa Catalina (16th-17th century)
- Church of N.tra S.ra Virgen de la Caridad (16th century)
- Hermitages of Jesus Nazareno, san Roque, and Calvario, 16th century chapels and sanctuaries
- Caseron de los Alcaides Cristianos (17th century)
- Palacio de Narvaez (17th century)
- Fuente de la Mora ("Fountain of the Moorish maiden"), also known as los venticinco canos, a fountain where waters from different springs are made to flow from twenty-five tubes.
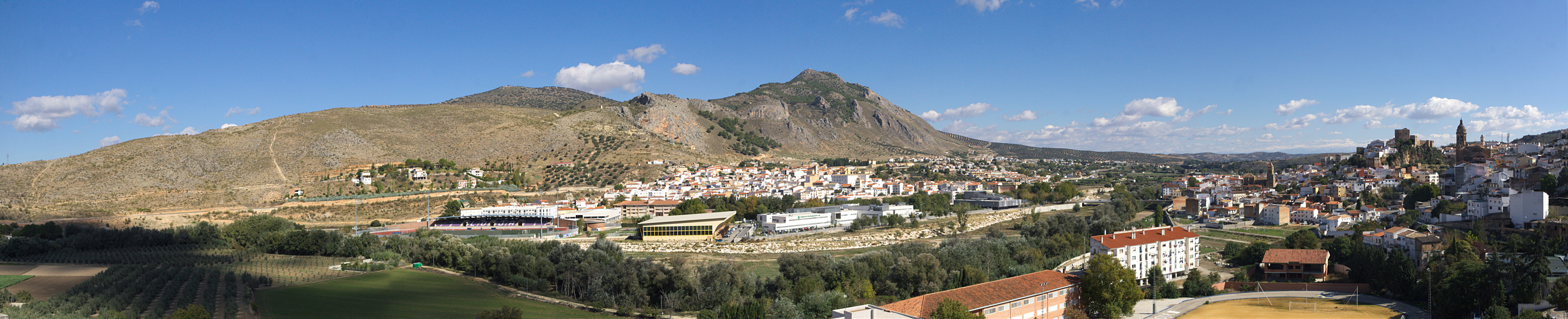
View of La Loja

== See also ==
- List of municipalities in Granada
