= Province of Granada =

Province of Spain

Province of Granada Provincia de Granada
- Province
- Flag Coat of arms

- Location of the Province of Granada in Spain
- Coordinates: 37°15′N 3°15′W
- Country: Spain
- Autonomous community: Andalusia
- Capital: Granada
- Municipalities: 174 (list)

Government
  - Type: Diputación
  - Body: Provincial Deputation of Granada

Area
  - Total: 12,645.38 km^{2} (4,882.41 sq mi)
  - Rank: 15th in Spain
- Highest elevation (Mulhacén): 3,479 m (11,414 ft)
- Lowest elevation (Alboran Sea): 0 m (0 ft)

Population (2025)
  - Total: 945,797
  - Rank: 17th in Spain
  - Density: 74.7939/km^{2} (193.715/sq mi)
- Demonym(s): Granadan, granadino/a
- Time zone: UTC+1 (CET)
  - Summer (DST): CEST
- GDP: €18,190,000,000
- GDP (per capita): €19,885
- Website: dipgra.es

The Province of Granada (Spanish: Provincia de Granada) is a province in the eastern part of the autonomous community of Andalusia in Spain. It is bordered by the provinces of Albacete, Murcia, Almería, Jaén, Córdoba, Málaga, and the Mediterranean Sea (along the Costa Tropical). Its capital is the city of Granada.

The province has a population of 945,797 in an area of 12,645.41 km^{2} (4,882.42 sq mi) across its 174 municipalities.

== Geography ==
The tallest mountain in the Iberian Peninsula, Mulhacén, is located in Granada. It measures 3,479 m (11,414 ft). The next highest mountains in the province are Veleta (3,396 m or 11,142 ft) and Alcazaba (3,371 m or 11,060 ft).

The river Genil, which rises in Granada, is one of the main tributaries of the Guadalquivir. Other important rivers include the Fardes, Monachil, Guadalfeo, Dílar, Ízbor, Verde and Darro.

Granada shares the Sierra Nevada National Park (in the Sierra Nevada mountain range) with Almería province. Another important range is the Sierra de Baza.

The northern part of the province, comprising the districts of Baza and Huescar is known as the Granada Altiplano.

== Municipalities ==
The province has 174 municipalities:

- Agrón
- Alamedilla
- Albolote
- Albondón
- Albuñán
- Albuñol
- Albuñuelas
- Aldeire
- Alfacar
- Algarinejo
- Alhama de Granada
- Alhendín
- Alicún de Ortega
- Almegíjar
- Almuñécar
- Alpujarra de la Sierra
- Alquife
- Arenas del Rey
- Armilla
- Atarfe
- Baza
- Beas de Granada
- Beas de Guadix
- Benalúa
- Benalúa de las Villas
- Benamaurel
- Bérchules
- Bubión
- Busquístar
- Cacín
- Cádiar
- Cájar
- La Calahorra
- Calicasas
- Campotéjar
- Caniles
- Cáñar
- Capileira
- Carataunas
- Cástaras
- Castilléjar
- Castril
- Cenes de la Vega
- Chauchina
- Chimeneas
- Churriana de la Vega
- Cijuela
- Cogollos de Guadix
- Cogollos Vega
- Colomera
- Cortes de Baza
- Cortes y Graena
- Cuevas del Campo
- Cúllar
- Cúllar Vega
- Darro
- Dehesas de Guadix
- Dehesas Viejas
- Deifontes
- Diezma
- Dílar
- Dólar
- Domingo Pérez de Granada
- Dúdar
- Dúrcal
- Escúzar
- Ferreira
- Fonelas
- Fornes
- Freila
- Fuente Vaqueros
- Las Gabias
- Galera
- Gobernador
- Gójar
- Gor
- Gorafe
- Granada
- Guadahortuna
- Guadix
- Los Guájares
- Gualchos
- Güéjar Sierra
- Güevéjar
- Huélago
- Huéneja
- Huéscar
- Huétor Santillán
- Huétor Tájar
- Huétor Vega
- Íllora
- Ítrabo
- Iznalloz
- Játar
- Jayena
- Jérez del Marquesado
- Jete
- Jun
- Juviles
- Láchar
- Lanjarón
- Lanteira
- Lecrín
- Lentegí
- Lobras
- Loja
- Lugros
- Lújar
- La Malahá
- Maracena
- Marchal
- Moclín
- Molvízar
- Monachil
- Montefrío
- Montejícar
- Montillana
- Moraleda de Zafayona
- Morelábor
- Motril
- Murtas
- Nevada
- Nigüelas
- Nívar
- Ogíjares
- Orce
- Órgiva
- Otívar
- Padul
- Pampaneira
- Pedro Martínez
- Peligros
- La Peza
- El Pinar
- Pinos Genil
- Pinos Puente
- Píñar
- Polícar
- Polopos
- Pórtugos
- Puebla de Don Fadrique
- Pulianas
- Purullena
- Quéntar
- Rubite
- Salar
- Salobreña
- Santa Cruz del Comercio
- Santa Fe
- Soportújar
- Sorvilán
- La Taha
- Torre-Cardela
- Torrenueva Costa
- Torvizcón
- Trevélez
- Turón
- Ugíjar
- Valderrubio
- El Valle
- Valle del Zalabí
- Válor
- Vegas del Genil
- Vélez de Benaudalla
- Ventas de Huelma
- Villa de Otura
- Villamena
- Villanueva de las Torres
- Villanueva Mesía
- Víznar
- Zafarraya
- Zagra
- La Zubia
- Zújar

== Demographics ==
Historical population
Year	Pop.	±%
1842	367,984	—
1857	441,917	+20.1%
1877	478,092	+8.2%
1887	482,787	+1.0%
1900	494,449	+2.4%
1910	526,865	+6.6%
1920	580,338	+10.1%
1930	656,396	+13.1%
1940	747,381	+13.9%
1950	793,338	+6.1%
1960	777,112	−2.0%
1970	741,659	−4.6%
1981	758,618	+2.3%
1991	790,515	+4.2%
2001	821,660	+3.9%
2011	922,100	+12.2%
2021	925,046	+0.3%
Source: INE

As of 2025, the population is 945,797, of which 49.2% are male, and 50.8% are female. Minors make up 16.8% of the population, and seniors make up 19.9%.

=== Immigration ===
As of 2025, immigrants make up 12.3% of the population. The 5 largest foreign countries of birth are Morocco, Colombia, Argentina, Romania, and the United Kingdom.

Foreign-born population (2025)
Country of birth	Population
Morocco	23,717
Colombia	9,660
Argentina	7,157
Romania	6,533
United Kingdom	6,278
Venezuela	5,211
Bolivia	4,851
France	4,515
Germany	4,320
Senegal	3,307
Ecuador	2,706
Honduras	2,673
Peru	2,145
Brazil	2,124
China	1,932

== Economy ==
Primary industries such as agriculture and fishing play an important role in the local economy. There was previously also a very large construction sector, but as of 2011 it was experiencing a deep downturn. The Granada Health Science Technological Park has created some high-skilled jobs in the biotechnology sector.

=== Tourism ===
The coast of Granada province is known as the Costa Tropical. It attracts large numbers of both Spanish and foreign holiday-makers. The main resorts are Almuñecar, Salobreña and La Herradura. The city of Granada brings in tourists from all over the world thanks to its Moorish architecture, especially the famous Alhambra palace. In the winter the mountains of the Sierra Nevada play host to Europe's most southerly ski resort. Hiking and eco-tourism also attract a number of visitors to areas such as the Alpujarras and Lecrin Valley.

=== Major employers ===
Puleva: founded in Granada in 1910, the company has been a subsidiary of the Lactalis group since 2001. It produces a wide range of dairy products, including milk and milkshakes, cream and products for infants. Puleva Biotech S.A. developed the first infant formula to contain nucleotides, and was a pioneer in the use of Omega-3 fatty acids in infant food products.

Coviran: supermarket chain which operates on a franchise basis, specialising in small, neighbourhood shops. It has 2,501 supermarkets across the whole of Spain and Portugal.

=== University and language students ===
The University of Granada is one of the largest universities in Spain, with approximately 56,000 students. Each year the city also attracts over 10,000 foreign students, including over 2,000 European students through the Erasmus programme. As well as providing employment to a large number of people, the university also boosts the local economy by creating demand for rental property. The money spent by students also helps to support shops, restaurants, bars and other services in the city. In recent years the university has also been working to capitalise on the research it does through commercial ventures.

== Transport ==
Air travel for the province is served by Federico García Lorca Granada Airport which provides direct routes to other parts of Spain and some European destinations. However, other nearby airports such as Málaga Airport, Seville Airport, Córdoba Airport and Región de Murcia International Airport are frequently used by air travellers from the province.

== Important monuments ==
The Alhambra World Heritage Site, Granada's biggest tourist attraction, showcases one of the very finest architectural legacies of Moorish rule in Spain, which in Granada lasted from 711 until 1492.

There are Roman Catholic cathedrals at Granada and Guadix.

The Royal Chapel of Granada houses the remains of the Catholic Monarchs, Isabella I of Castile (1451–1504) and Ferdinand II of Aragon (1452–1516); as well as of their daughter Joanna of Castile (1479–1555) and of her husband Philip the Handsome (69–70).

== See also ==
- List of municipalities in Granada
- Emirate of Granada
- Province of Spain
- Sierra Nevada National Park
- Historical configuration of the province of Granada
