= Montefrío =

Municipality in Granada, Spain

- Montefrío
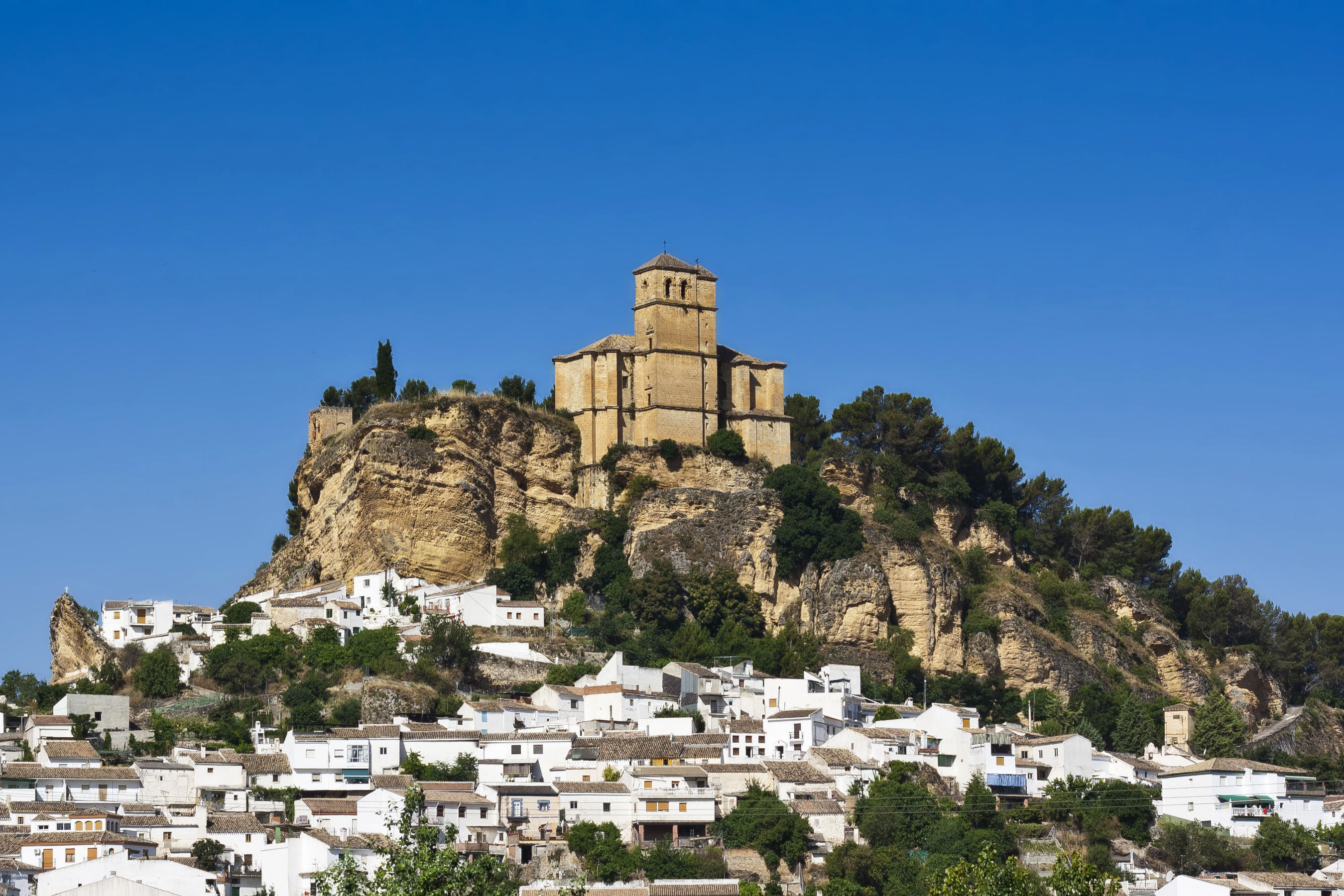
- View of Montefrío

- Coat of arms

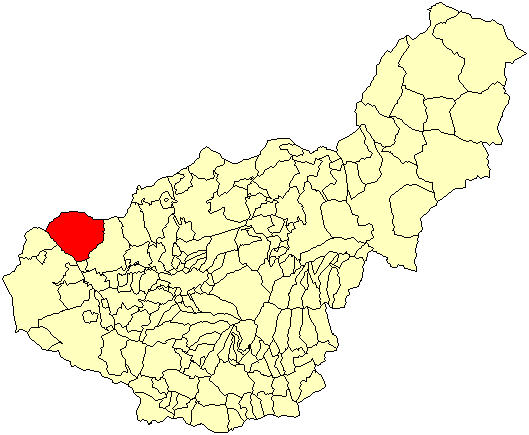
- Location of Montefrío

- Location in Spain
- Coordinates: 37°19′16″N 4°00′40″W

Area
  - Total: 253.92 km^{2} (98.04 sq mi)
- Elevation: 834 m (2,736 ft)

Population (2025-01-01)
  - Total: 5,283
  - Density: 20.81/km^{2} (53.89/sq mi)
- Demonym(s): montefrieño, -ña
- Time zone: UTC+1 (CET)
  - Summer (DST): UTC+2 (CEST)
- Postal code: 18270
- Website: Official website

Montefrio is a municipality in the province of Granada. The ruins of a Moorish castle sit near the highest point. Being built midway between the Sierra de Priego and Sierra Parapanda, and commanding the open valley between these ranges, it became one of the chief frontier fortresses of the Moors in the 15th century.

The climate of Montefrío is a continental Mediterranean type. The economy is typically agrarian, with olives as the main crop. The relatively limited industry revolves around agricultural processing such as oil and dairy products. The population is reported as 6,688, with 3,337 men and 3,351 women. Near the town is a vast archaeological site known as Las Peñas de los Gitanos, famous for its prehistoric tombs and remains of Roman and Visigothic settlements.

Montefrío's main road has many shops, cafes, bars and restaurants which are independently run. It leads on to Plaza Virgen de Los Remedios which then leads on to Plaza de España.

Montefrio's primary church is the only round church in the whole of Spain since its recapture from Muslim control. The church is said to have been converted from an old mosque.

== Etymology ==
The town's name means "cold mountain", from Spanish monte frio.

== Geography ==
Montefrío is in the northwest of the province of Granada, situated in the region of Loja. The township occupies about 254 km2 and has a density of 25.37 inhabitants / km ². Its geographical coordinates are 37 ° 19 'N, 04 ° 01' W. It is situated at an altitude of 834 m and 57 km from the capital of Granada. Montefrio is limited on the north with the municipalities of Priego de Córdoba and Almedinilla (Córdoba) and Alcalá la Real (Jaén); the southeast with íllora, on the south by Villanueva Mesia and Stump; and on the southwest by Loja and Algarinejo, the latter belonging to the province of Granada.

=== Districts ===
The municipality counts with the annexed of Lojilla. This small village is located about 7 km from the village. The only access is to Lojilla is by the road between Montefrío and Alcalá la Real, from the junction at “La venta del conejo”. Its altitude is 994.3 meters and the terrain has a slope of 20.89%. Its population is 79 inhabitants. They celebrate a feast on 20 January in honor of its patron saint San Sebastian, and on July 25, the feast of Santiago. They highlight the festival of San Sebastián. The amazing thing about this festival is that locals walk through the streets of the village dressed in colorful costumes, hats with bells and ribbons which are also colored. Jumping, dancing and begging passers towards the cost of the party. It was ancient custom that were getting farmhouse cottage in cakes, oil and melons. The beginning is in the late afternoon and after a day of olive picking and last until the early hours of the night. Flush (coffee with anise) and typical local products such as chorizo and morcilla grilled are taken.

The origin of the festival is unknown, but is believed that the party is related with the one celebrated in Los Verdiales (Málaga) because of the similarity of its outfit. After 15 years without taking place, it was celebrated again in 2010. The party seeks to be declared by their ancestral origin and singularity of interest by the Junta de Andalucía.

=== Hydrography ===
The township has four main streams:

- Arroyo de turca, which rises in the hill of Gachas and Marcos and empties into the term Algarinejo
- El arroyo Milanos, born in Montesanto, runs through lands of Loja and ends up in the Genil and the lands of Huétor Tájar
- Arroyo de los pinares, born in the farmhouse Fuente Dorada and flows into the Genil, in the lands of Villanueva Mesia
- Arroyo de los Molinos, watering the western slope of the Sierra de Parapanda and joins the stream flows into the Genil by the íllora term

=== Climate ===
Montefrío climate is Mediterranean with continental features. It is not particularly cold, with rainy winters and hot, dry summers. Autumns and Springs are mild and slightly rainy. According to a study by the Council of Granada, made in the early 1990s, between three distinct locations (Cortijo de Tara, Lojilla and Montefrío), the following data are derived:

- Rainfall: 631.4 mm
- Average temperature: 15.2 °C
- Average low temperature: 8.34 °C
- Maximum average temperature: 20.44 °C

Data should not be taken too seriously, because within the same municipality, there are areas with higher rainfall than others. In some areas if this average is reached, other do not get to 500 mm per year.

=== Communications ===
The A-335 crosses through the town from north to south. To the east is the NO-26 which also binds to the N-432 as it passes through Puerto Lope and is the shortest way to get to Granada.

From the A92, exit Huétor-Tájar, then up the road connecting the two towns, bordering the creek Milanos, which is the best option. One can also reach Montefrío from neighboring villages and Algarinejo íllora through local roads. The major elevations are the Sierra de Parapanda with 1,604 m at the boundary between Montefrío and íllora, and saw the peak Chanzas Pepper of 1,213 m between Montefrío and Algarinejo.

== Economy ==
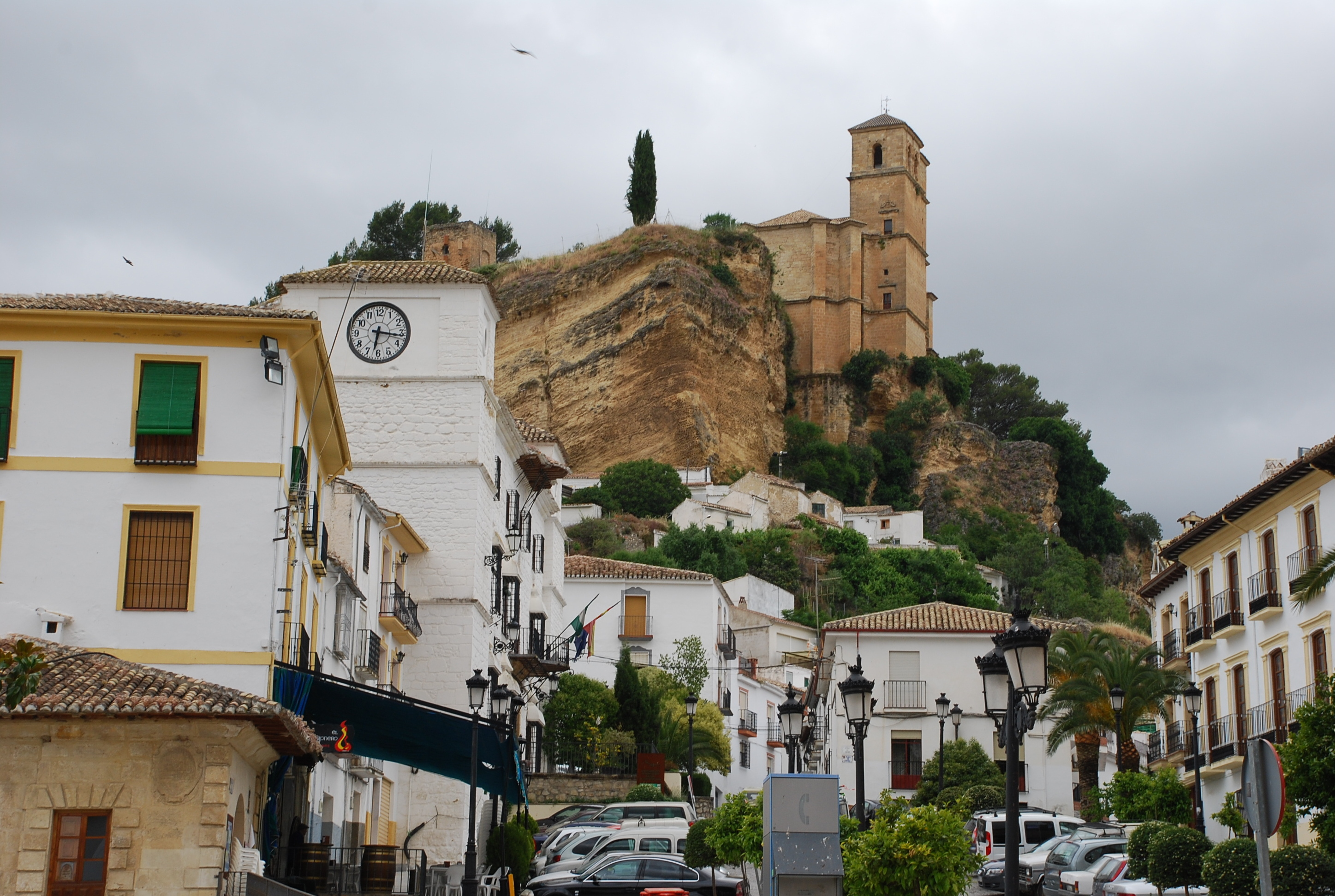
Montefrío

Montefrio's economy is based on agriculture and animal husbandry. Must emphasize the 16,221 olives of which 15204 belong to dry farming and irrigated rest. Within arable crops we highlight the 471 ha of barley and 12 ha of potato (SIMA 2007).

As for livestock, Montefrío in the eighteenth century became one of the most important pastoral areas of eastern Andalusia (about 50,000 head of cattle). Currently these figures are substantially lower, highlighting the pigs won, goat and sheep. It is this primary sector that derives little existing industry. A cooperative dairy related products, the cheese is famous throughout Spain; several mills, two of which incorporated cooperatives; companies engaged in the development of products derived from the olive; and a high-quality meat products.

Montefrío is one of Andalucia's “Pueblos Blancos” (white towns of Andalucia). Tourism in Montefrío has escalated in recent years having been named a top 10 National Geographic views of a pueblo (town) in 2017. There are several fiestas (festivals) throughout the year, notably the month long “Fiesta de Agosto” (August Festival). Iits culture, fiestas, heritage sites drive year-round tourism.

== See also ==
- List of municipalities in Granada
