= National and regional identity in Spain =

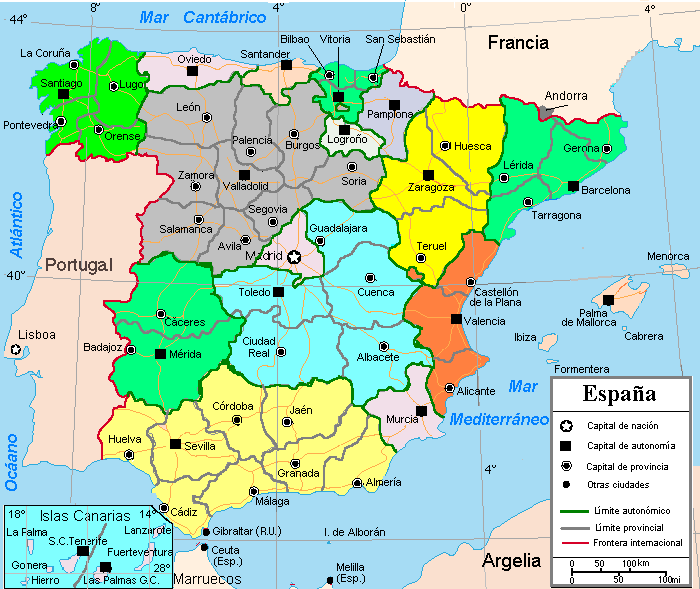
Autonomous communities and provinces of Spain

Both the perceived nationhood of Spain, and the perceived distinctions between different parts of its territory derive from historical, geographical, linguistic, economic, political, ethnic and social factors.

Present-day Spain was formed in the wake of the expansion of the Christian states in northern Spain, a process known as the Reconquista. The Reconquista, ending with the Fall of Granada in 1492, was followed by a contested process of religious and linguistic unification and political centralisation, which began under the Catholic Monarchs and continued intermittently into the 20th century. Peripheral nationalism in its modern form arose chiefly in Catalonia and the Basque Country during the 19th century. The modern division of Spain into Autonomous Communities embodies an attempt to recognise nationalities and regional identities within Spain as a basis for devolution of power.

From the Reconquista onwards, in most parts of the peninsula, territories have identified themselves as distinct from the rest of Spain in one of three ways. In the north: Galicia, León, Cantabria, Asturias, the Basque Country and Navarre; and the east: Aragon, Catalonia, Balearic Islands and Valencia distinguish themselves through claims of historical independence and, often, the presence of a native minority language. Many of these areas also identify with Christian kingdoms from the early Reconquista, before dynastic unions linked the provinces. In the south, some Andalusians claim a unique national identity, often based on the idea of a distinct Andalusian dialect of Spanish or, sometimes, because of the deeper impact of the Al-Andalus historical period there. In central Spain, entities have identities historically connected to the Kingdom of Castile.

Demands for greater autonomy or full independence remain in certain regions, conflicting with the view that decentralisation has already gone far enough. The most dramatic recent manifestations of separatism have been the violent campaign by the Basque ETA group in the late 20th century, and the unilateral Catalan declaration of independence in 2017.

== Aspects of unity and diversity within Spain ==
=== Geographical ===
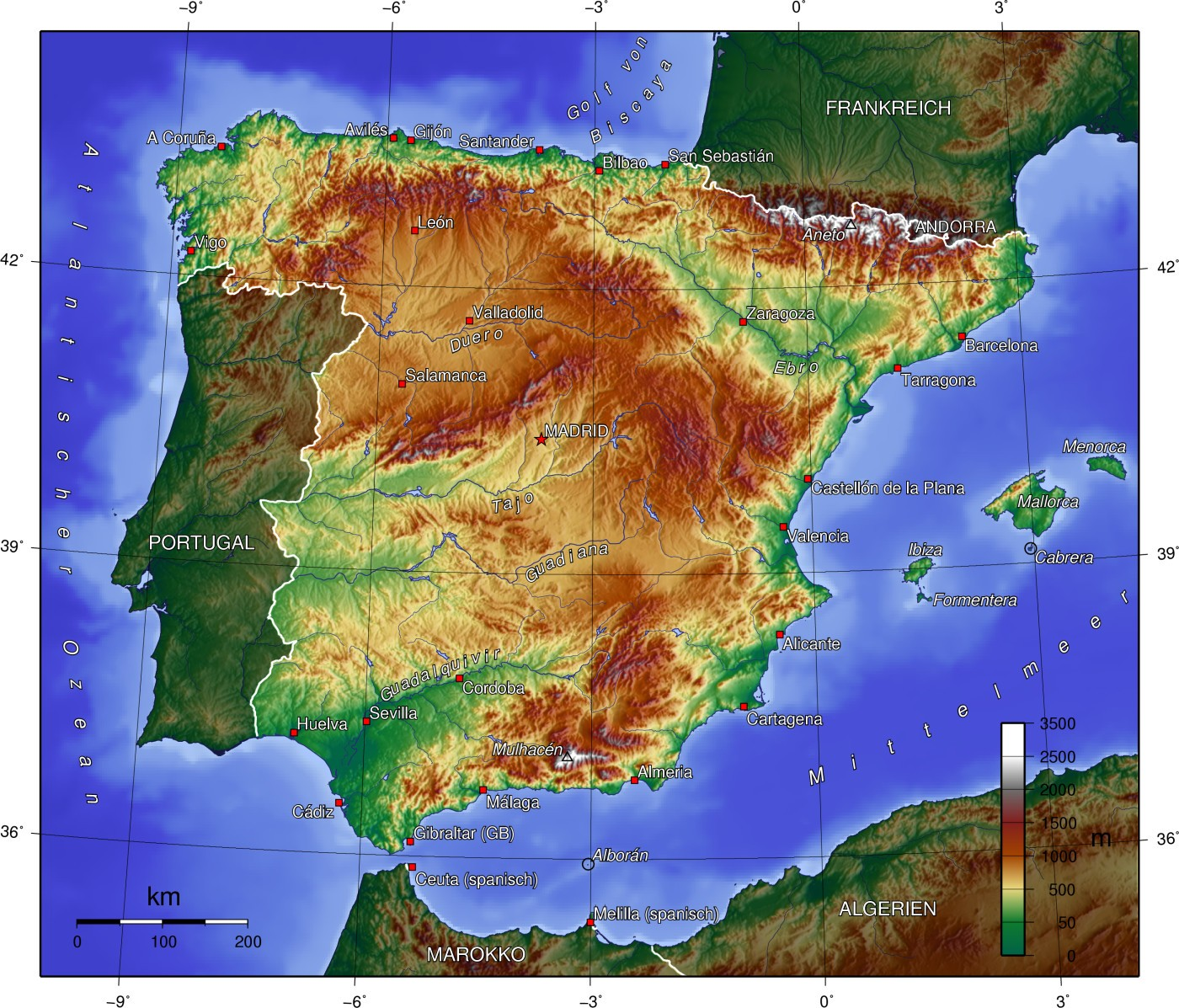
Topography of Spain

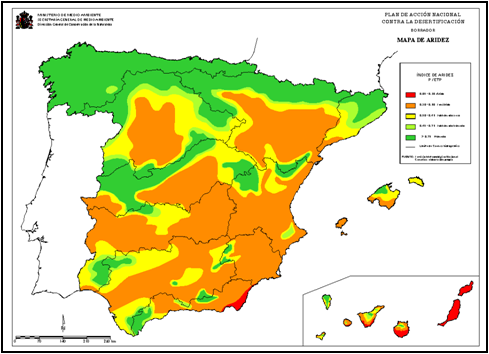
Extent of arid conditions in Spain

... the Peninsula strongly asserts a fundamental unity comprising considerable variety

— Madariaga, p. 177–8

Mainland Spain has been characterised historically by relative inaccessibility from outside and by difficult communication between different parts of it. "[W]alls and battlements divide within itself the territory which walls and battlements separate from other countries". In contrast to the "vast monotony" of the central plateau, the surrounding peripheral areas "present to the traveler every possible landscape". Diversity in forms of agriculture and its productivity are conditioned by the contrasts in rainfall between "wet" and "dry" Spain, and to the extent that irrigation has been introduced. In the past the peripheral regions benefited from cheap coastal transport, whereas transport costs and distance hindered the development of the central regions.

=== Historical ===
==== Roman and Islamic conquests ====
Muslim conquests, 732

The Iberian Peninsula, as Hispania, became subject to Rome in the third to first centuries BC. The Romans divided the peninsula into different provinces and introduced the Latin language, Roman law, and later Christianity to the majority of the peninsula. They were succeeded by a number of Germanic tribes. The most significant of these was the Visigoths, who attempted to unify the disparate parts of Iberia, focusing on the Roman legacy, especially the Roman law.

711AD marks the beginning of the Arab period. The vast majority of Iberia came under Islamic control fairly quickly. Over the next couple hundred years, the rulers of Muslim Spain, especially the Caliphate of Cordoba, were consolidating power and patronizing the arts and sciences, as well as experiencing relative religious tolerance.

==== Reconquista: Rise of the Christian states ====
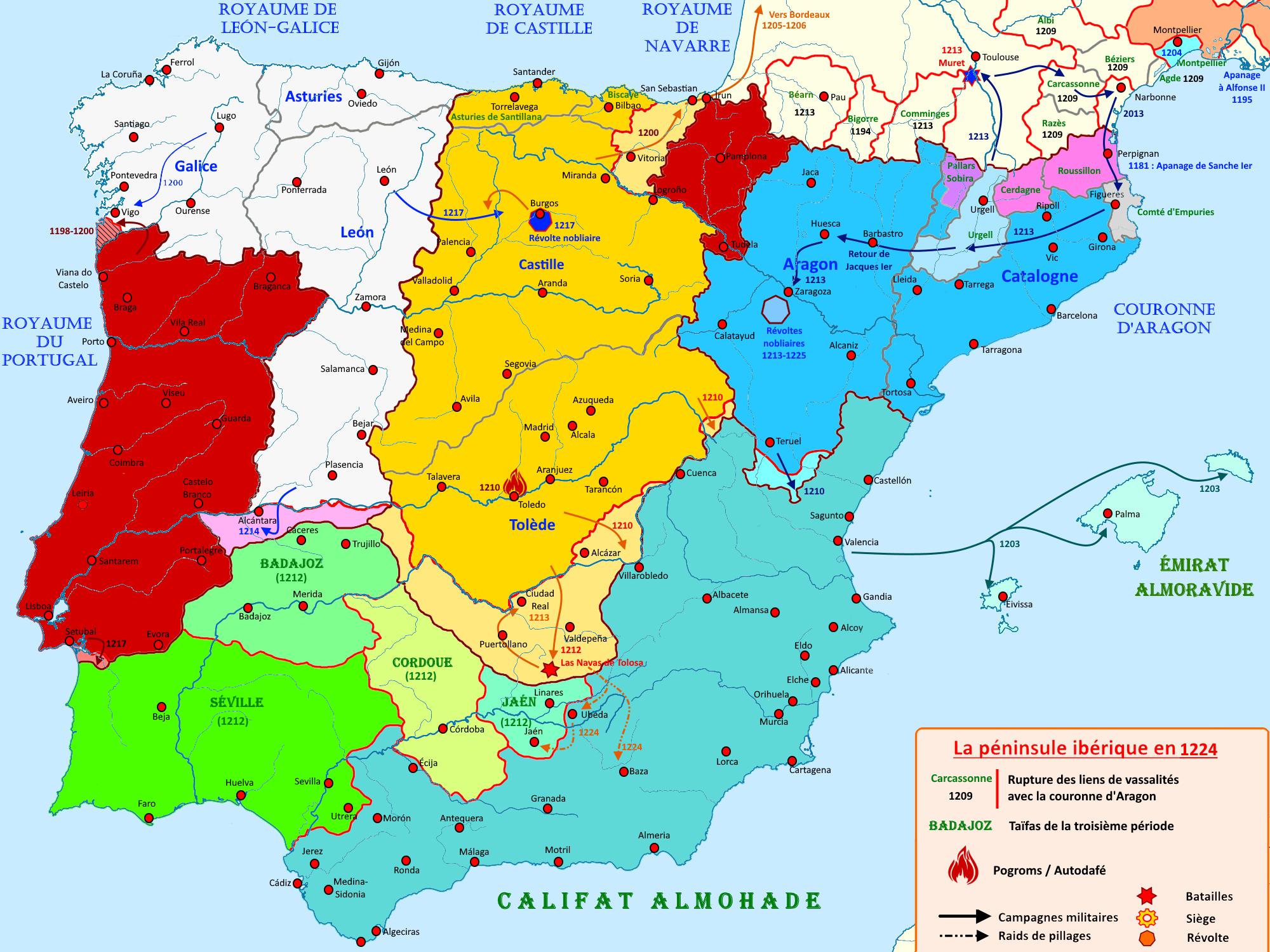
Iberian polities in 1224

In the mountainous, rural northern regions to the north, the Christian rulers were regaining their footing, despite numerous internal conflicts, and they slowly expanded their control throughout the Reconquista, between the Battle of Covadonga c. 720 CE and the Fall of Granada in 1492.

During this period several independent Christian kingdoms and mostly independent political entities (Asturias, León, Galicia, Castile, Navarre, Aragon, Catalonia) were formed by their own inhabitants' efforts under aristocratic leadership, coexisting with the Muslim Iberian states and having their own identities and borders. Portugal, formerly part of León, gained independence in 1128 after a split in the inheritance of the daughters of Alfonso VI and remained independent throughout the Reconquista.

All these different kingdoms were ruled together, or separately in personal union, but maintained their particular ethnic differences, regardless of similarities through common origins or borrowed customs. These kingdoms sometimes collaborated when they fought against Al-Andalus and sometimes allied themselves with the Muslims against rival Christian neighbors.

==== Unification ====
Former Kingdoms on the Iberian peninsula

The common non-Christian enemy has been usually considered the single crucial catalyst for the union of the different Christian realms. However, it was effective only for permanently reconquered territories. Much of the unification happened long after the departure of the last Muslim rulers. Just as Christians remained in Arab Spain after the Muslim conquest, so too did Muslims and Arab culture remain after Christian conquest.

Eventually, the kingdoms of Castile and Aragon eclipsed the others in power and size through conquest and dynastic inheritance. The process of amalgamation can be summed up thus: From the west, Galicia and Asturias merged into León, which itself was incorporated in the Crown of Castile; from the east, Catalonia and Valencia merged into the Crown of Aragon. The Crowns of Castile and Aragon finally united in 1469 with the marriage of the Catholic Monarchs. After this, the Muslim Emirate of Granada was conquered in 1492, and Navarre was invaded and forced into the union in 1512, through a combination of conquest and collaboration of the local elites. Castile and Aragon remained in many ways distinct territories: Philip II and his Castilian officials marked the occasion of crossing into Aragon with a ceremony of laying down their symbols of authority.

During the Bourbon monarchy of the 18th century, the central authorities in Spain made various efforts towards centralisation, notably the Nueva Planta decrees extinguishing most of the ‘’fueros’’ – long-standing privileges and institutions of different territories. Some kingdoms, like Navarre and the Lordships of the Basque Country, did maintain constitutions based on their historical rights and laws, while other kingdoms revolted against this process of centralisation demanding a return of their derogated laws as well as better living conditions (Revolt of the Comuneros, Revolt of the Brotherhoods, Catalan Revolt).

==== 19th- and 20th-century movements ====
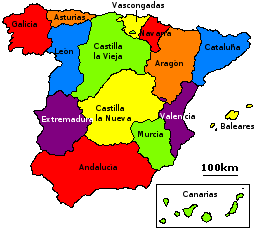
The "historic regions" of Spain, as listed in the 1833 decree

In the 1833 territorial division of Spain, the nation was divided into 49 provinces – most of which have remained unchanged since then – which were grouped into 15 "historic regions", many of whose boundaries bear a strong resemblance to those of the present-day Autonomous Communities. The "historic regions", however, were not granted any administrative powers.

Carlism, a royalist Catholic reaction to the 19th-century liberal state, was strongest among poorer peasants in Navarre, the Basque Country, and rural areas of Catalonia. Nationalistic movements with significant support appeared in some parts of Spain – especially in the Basque Country and Catalonia – later in the 19th century, coinciding with the loss of the last parts of the Spanish Empire, the abolition of privileges, and some regions having advanced more than others in industrial development. The dictator Primo de Rivera moved against regional liberties and privileges, but the Second Republic (1931–6) made a start on restoring and extending regional autonomy.

Following the Spanish Civil War, the Francoist regime imposed Spanish as the only official language. The use of other languages was restricted, and all forms of regional autonomy and special privileges (except in Navarre) were suppressed. The attempt to "eradicate the linguistic and cultural diversity of Spain" went further than any previous regime, but only "led to the revitalization and spread of regionalist sentiments".

==== Autonomous communities ====
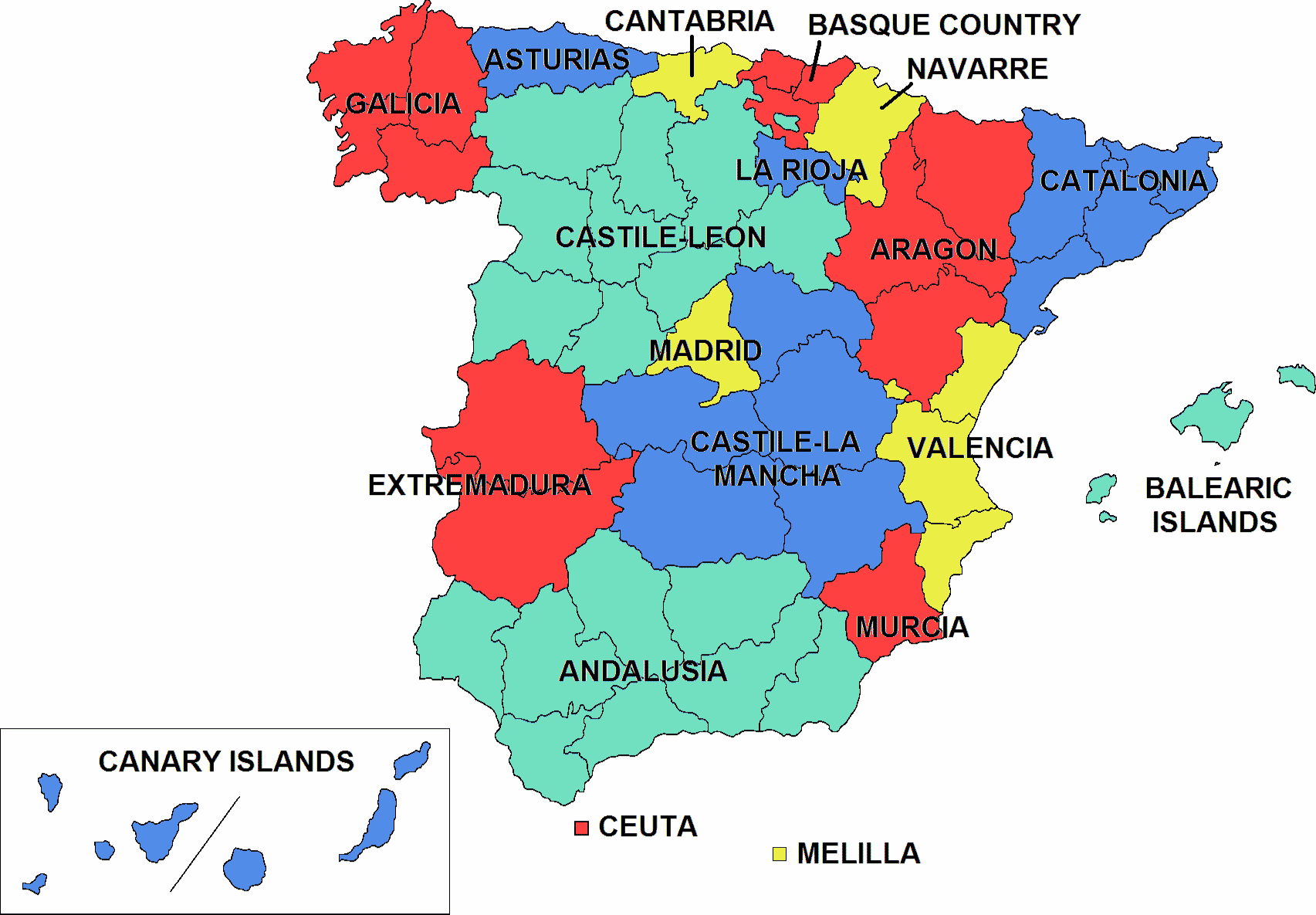
Autonomous Communities of Spain

In the Spanish transition to democracy after the Franco period, there were many movements for more autonomy in certain regions of the country, advocating full independence in some cases, and an autonomous "community" in others. Following the provisions of the 1978 Constitution, Spain was divided into seventeen autonomous entities, each comprising one or more of the fifty provinces. Various powers have been devolved from the centre to these “Autonomous Communities”, which have their own parliaments and governing institutions. This process created a decentralised state structure but not a federal one. While recognising a "right to autonomy", the Constitution reaffirmed the "indissoluble unity of Spain". There has been a "real decentralisation of power", at the expense of an "enormous and confusing variety of autonomy statutes".

Eight of the Autonomous Communities (Andalucia, Aragon, Basque Country, Canary Islands, Catalonia, Galicia, and Valencia) are officially designated as "nationalities", while the rest are defined as regions, historical regions, communities and historical communities. The designation as a "nationality" was originally confined to the "historic nationalities" of Catalonia, the Basque Country, and Galicia, which were selected to receive a greater degree of autonomy sooner, but later amendments have increased the autonomy of most other regions as well.

This delineation of regions and nationalities within Spain has been seen as only imperfectly reflecting historical and ethnic distinctions. The Autonomous Communities were not built from scratch but were assembled from pre-existing provinces, some of which themselves contained splits in terms of linguistic and regional identity. By contrast, several smaller regions such as La Rioja opted to become separate Autonomous Communities despite having a weak or conflicted regional identity.

=== Linguistic ===
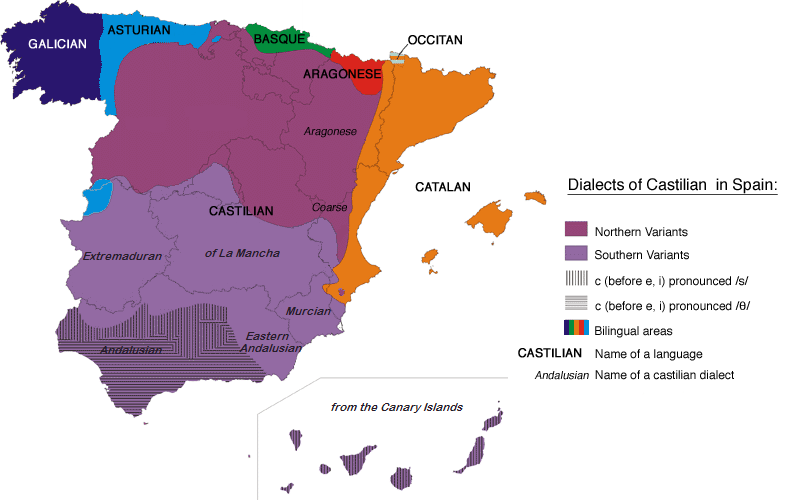
Languages and dialects in Spain

The 1978 Constitution specifies Spanish as the official language of the State and declares that "all Spaniards have the duty to know it and the right to use it". It goes on to state that other Spanish languages shall also be official within their respective Autonomous Communities as laid down in their Statutes of Autonomy. This provision has been criticised as a "territoriality principle", conflicting with the "personality principle" underlying the right to use Spanish anywhere in Spain.

Among the Spanish population as a whole, Spanish is spoken by 98.9%, and 23.3% speak Catalan/Valencian (17.5% speak Catalan and 5.8% speak Valencian), 6.2% speak Galician and 3,0% speak Basque. Valencian and Catalan are regarded by most linguists and the European Union as the same language. There are other minority languages such as Asturian, Cantabrian and Leonese which are dialects of the same language, spoken in Asturias, Cantabria and the region of León, alongside Aragonese and Aranese in the Pyrenees.

=== Economic ===
The economic history of Spain has been described in terms of a regional imbalance between a progressive periphery and a stagnant centre. "The prosperity of the periphery could not be easily transferred to the rest of Spain: there was still no true national economy". "By 1930, when a Roman would still have felt at home on an Andalusian estate, Catalonia contained some of the largest textile concerns in Europe". Madrid had long been a centre of small-scale manufacturing, but the development of Spanish industry began in Catalonia at the end of the 18th century in the form of cotton textiles, and later in the Basque Country centred on the iron ore deposits. Thus the regions of industrial development in part coincided with those where a distinctive language and culture were most prominent. Moreover, the economic development of Spain as a whole was late and sporadic, and its wealth and prestige had suffered repeated blows from the loss of the colonies: "if [Spain] had become a prosperous and progressive community, no-one would have turned to Catalan nationalism".

Regional disparity continued into the 1960s and the 1970s as industry continued to grow mainly in the regions where it was already concentrated, bringing about the internal migration of millions of Spaniards and contributing to a revival of nationalism in the receiving regions. Catalonia and the Basque Country, together with Madrid and Navarre, are still the wealthiest parts of Spain in terms of GDP per head, and this has fuelled conflict between the regions and the centre over regional autonomy in taxation and over policies for redistribution between richer and poorer regions.

== Expressions of unity and diversity ==
=== Social attitudes ===
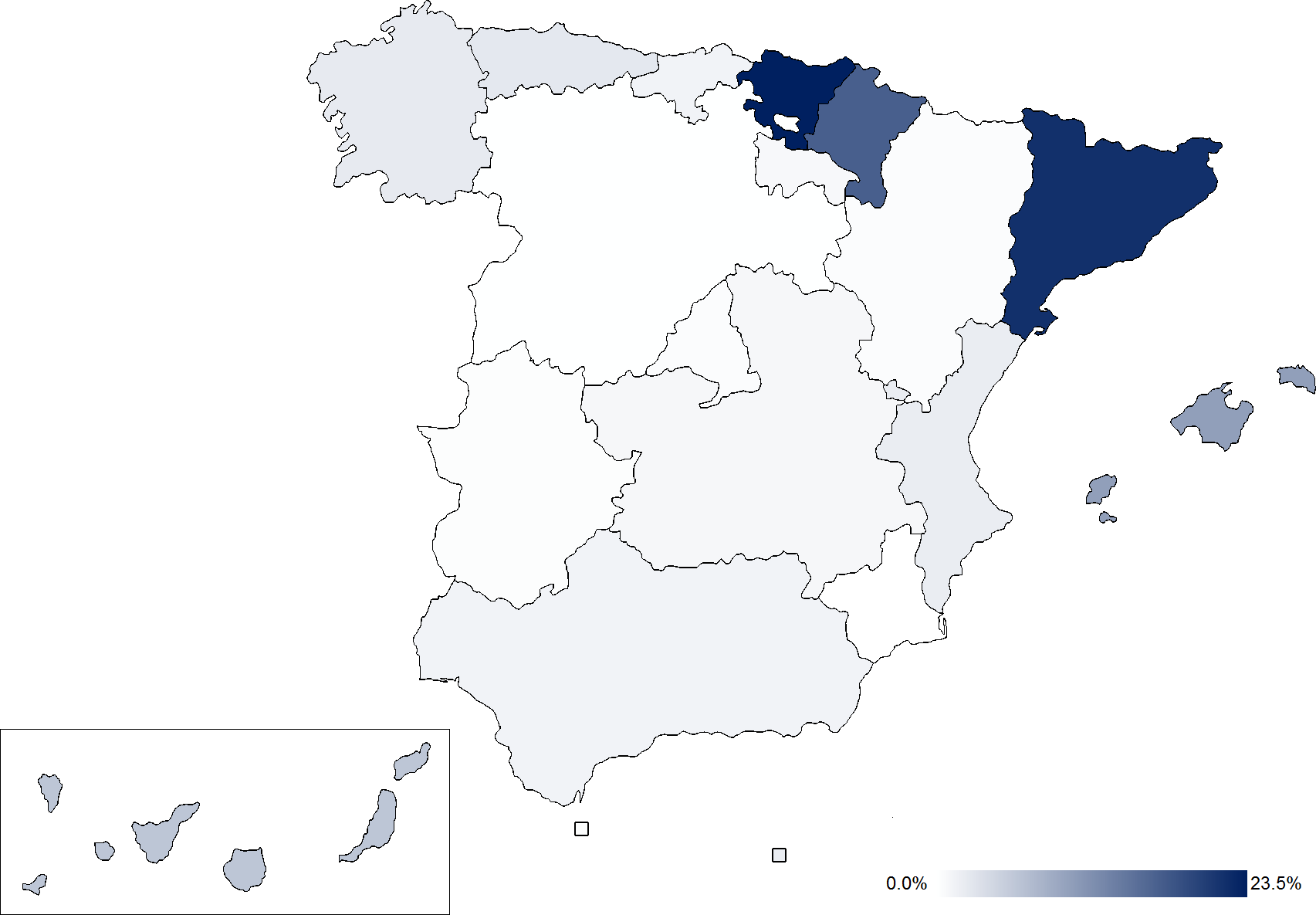
Percentage population of regions of Spain not identifying with Spain, results of a 2012 CIS survey. The scale runs from 0 to 23.5%

Eurobarometer surveys throughout Europe asked people to "rate their attachment to their region" and to their country, EU, and local area. From this data a "regionalism index" was constructed. By this index Spain is the country with the highest variation between regions in the degree of regionalism, interpreted as reflecting "internal tensions within the Spanish state, where the dominant Castilian-speaking group seems to have become increasingly loyal to the state in response to pressures from non-Castilian areas for devolution or secession". Madrid, Castilla y León, Castilla-La Mancha, Cantabria and Murcia are among the lowest 10 regions in Europe on this index, while the Basque Country and Catalonia are among the top 10. There has been "a persistent tension between Spanish national identity, nationalism, and state-building on the one hand, and the corresponding forces in the ethno-regions on the other" as the result of the way in which the Spanish state became integrated.

Another survey, carried out in 2002 in Spain only, asked respondents about their comparative degree of identification with their own region compared to that with Spain. In the Basque Country and Catalonia, 15% or more "did not consider themselves Spanish at all". In all regions except Madrid, a majority identified at least as strongly with their region as with Spain, indicating "well-established" regional consciousness throughout the country. "[M]any Spaniards do not identify with being Spanish, but rather have a tendency to identify more with either their region or city."

Results from a 2012 survey by the Centro de Investigaciones Sociológicas clearly identified three autonomous communities with significantly higher percentage populations who did not identify with Spain at all: Basque Country (23.5%), Catalonia (21.9%) and Navarre (16.9%).

=== Political parties and movements ===
There is continued pressure in some regions for increased autonomy or full independence. The two most popular parties in Spain have different views on the subject. The People's Party supports a more centralized Spain, with a unitary market, and usually does not support movements advocating greater regional autonomy. The newer Citizens party was formed in Catalonia in 2006 to oppose independence, and now operates throughout Spain. The Spanish Socialist Workers' Party supports a federal state with greater autonomy for the regions, but is opposed to total independence for any region. Nationalist and regionalist political parties operate in many parts of Spain, with widely varying policy platforms and degrees of support.

==== Spanish nationalism ====
Spanish nationalism has been tied to the conception of a Castilian region as a hub connecting the different parts of Spain; however in practice the language and culture of central Spain are essential to the concept of the Spanish Nation. Other usual components of the nation have been pan-Hispanism and the Catholic church. Historically, the development of Spanish nationalism has been tied to the state-building process of the Spanish monarchy, with its capital in Madrid.

Through the 16th and 17th centuries Spain hugely increased its wealth and power through colonial conquest. Nevertheless, although under a single monarchy, Spain remained "a confederation of loosely connected States" with "no real political unity". The Catholic Church in Spain, upholding and upheld by the State and with the Inquisition enforcing religious orthodoxy, was much more important as a unifying factor. The power of the Church began to wane during the 18th century as the Bourbon monarchy sought a more centralised State. The 19th-century liberal governments continued the centralising process, but encountered increasing resistance in the regions and failed to "invent tradition" as a new focus for national feeling: an annual celebration on May 2 recalling national resistance to the Napoleonic invasion did not excite much national fervour, and the religious identity of Spain still predominated over the secular one when Franco came to power. "In comparison with France, the centralizing spirit of Spain was very mild" and even Franco did not succeed permanently in making Spain "a culturally homogeneous nation".

Today, Spanish nationalists often reject other nationalist movements within Spain, specifically Catalan and Basque nationalism, but have not so far been able to "articulate a collective project that could integrate distinct peoples who feel themselves to be different".

==== Peripheral Nationalism ====
In Spain, "nationalism" may refer to unitary Spanish nationalism or to the assertion of nationhood for one of the territories within Spain. Many but by no means all supporters of the latter urge secession of their territory from the Spanish state. There are clearly defined nationalist parties that support separation from the Spanish state, like the Republican Left of Catalonia. Other nationalist parties, such as Junts, Basque Nationalist Party, and Galician Nationalist Bloc, have taken a range of positions between supporting greater decentralization of the Spanish state and calling for outright separation.

==== Regionalism ====
In many parts of Spain—Castile, León, Cantabria, Navarre, Balearic Islands, Valencia, Andalusia, Rioja, Extremadura, La Mancha, Murcia, Ceuta & Melilla—most people do not sense a conflict between Spanish nationality and their own claimed national or regional identity. One of the regions with most powerful regionalism is Cantabria with the Cantabrian Regionalist Party (PRC).

Regionalists "see the region as the real historical unit". They may call for greater autonomous powers and for the definition of the region as a nationality or nation within Spain, or may seek to promote the interests of the region without challenging its status within the system of Autonomous Communities. Some of these regionalist parties are associated with the People's Party in its region or acting as its substitute or branch, as in the Navarrese People's Union. (UPN).

=== Culture and traditions ===
The cultural image of "flamenco, Sevillanas dancing, and bullfighting, which originated in Andalusia" is widespread outside Spain, but this image is "rather narrow and misleading" and "has really masked the true heterogeneous nature of the country."

== Eastern and northeastern Spain ==
Diachronic map of the realms and lands of the Crown of Aragon

The Autonomous Communities which made up the former Crown of Aragon (Aragon, Catalonia, Valencia, and the Balearic Islands) can be treated with slightly more unity when dealing with the past than when dealing with the present. By the time of the dynastic union between Ferdinand and Isabella, the Crown of Aragon encompassed many different states and territories, including ones in other parts of the Mediterranean Sea, though only four remain within Spain's borders now. At the time of the union, and long afterwards, those states were known as the Kingdom of Aragon, the Principality of Catalonia, the Kingdom of Valencia, and the Kingdom of Majorca.

Despite all being under the same crown, each kingdom effectively had its own distinct government. The Crown of Aragon was characterised by limited monarchy and a federalist structure. The monarchy was limited by some of the earliest constitutions in Europe. Each polity was essentially treated as a separate country with separate laws and parliaments, though united by one king. Each kingdom retained its own laws (fueros). The parliaments claimed representative authority for the people of their kingdom, initiated new legislation (though the king retained veto power), and needed to approve any expenditures by the crown. The monarchy, then, had to engage in negotiation and compromise. These kingdoms retained their independent identity after the dynastic union of Aragon and Castile, in the face of subsequent efforts towards unification and centralisation by Spanish leaders.

=== Catalonia ===
==== Geography ====
Catalonia, in the north-east of Spain bordering France and the Mediterranean, contains large areas of productive agriculture. Historically it has been a land of small proprietors with relatively secure tenure. Its position has oriented its trade towards the Mediterranean through the great port-city of Barcelona, rather than the transatlantic trade that grew during the Spanish Golden Age.

==== History ====
Principality of Catalonia (red) within the Aragonese Crown

The Senyera - The Catalan flag

Catalonia's identity derives from before it was a part of the Crown of Aragon. Largely free of Muslim occupation, Catalonia long had closer ties to France and areas other than in Iberia. Briefly part of Charlemagne's empire, the Catalan counties broke away when Carolingian monarchs proved unable to successfully defend them. By the 11th century the County of Barcelona embraced most of present-day Catalonia plus some territories in France, and had grown to be an important Mediterranean power.

The County of Barcelona united by marriage with the Kingdom of Aragon in the mid-12th century, forming the Crown of Aragon, and the County became known as the Principality of Catalonia. With the ancient Parliament of Catalonia (the Corts Catalanes) and the Catalan constitutions, Catalonia developed one of the first constitutional monarchies in Europe. Catalonia is said to have "reached her maximum splendor" at this time, and possessed a strong literary tradition, especially represented by the Jocs Florals, a form of poetry contest. The crisis of the 14th century, the end of the reign of House of Barcelona and a civil war (1462–1472) weakened the role of the Principality within the Crown and international affairs.

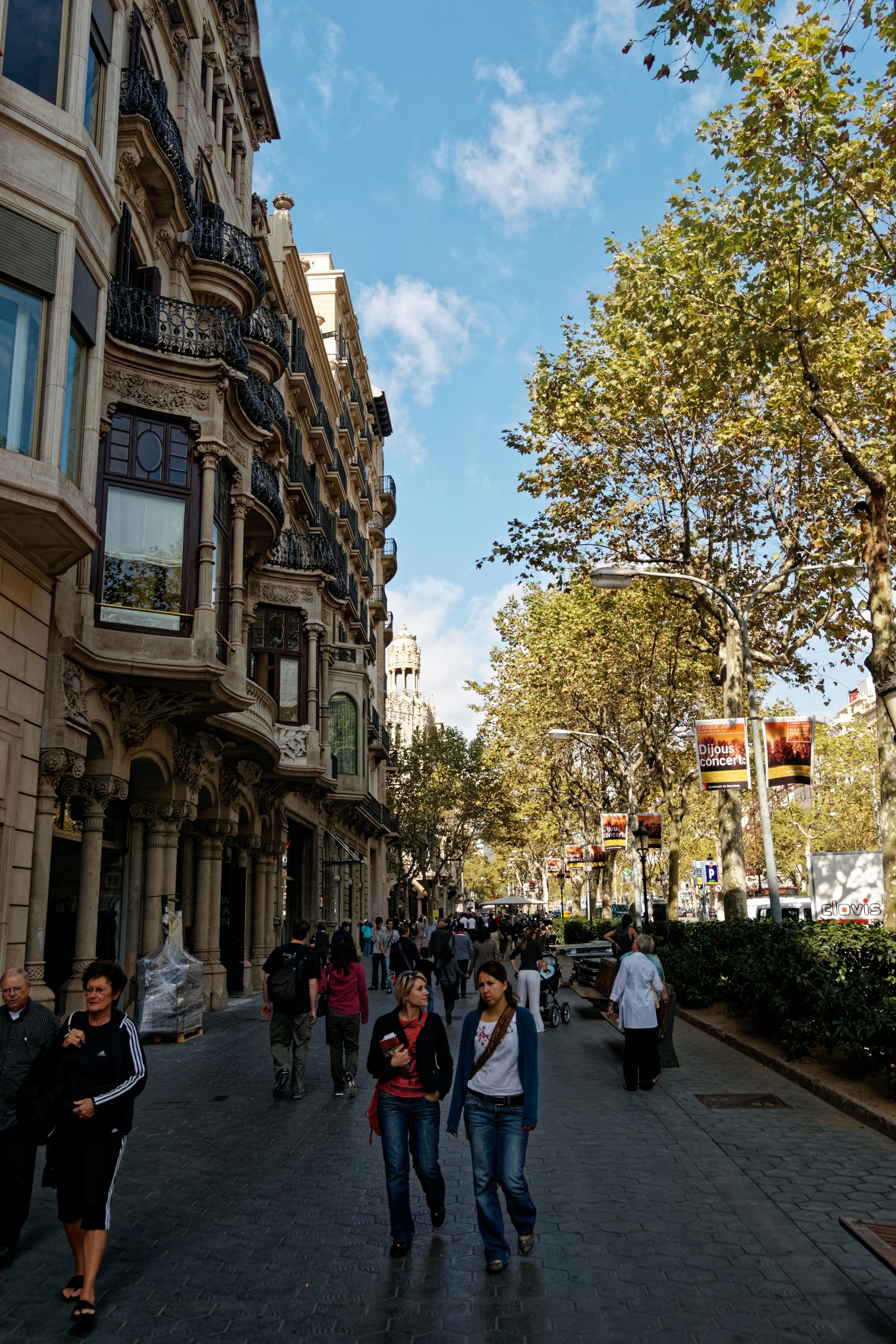
Architecture of Barcelona, c. 1900

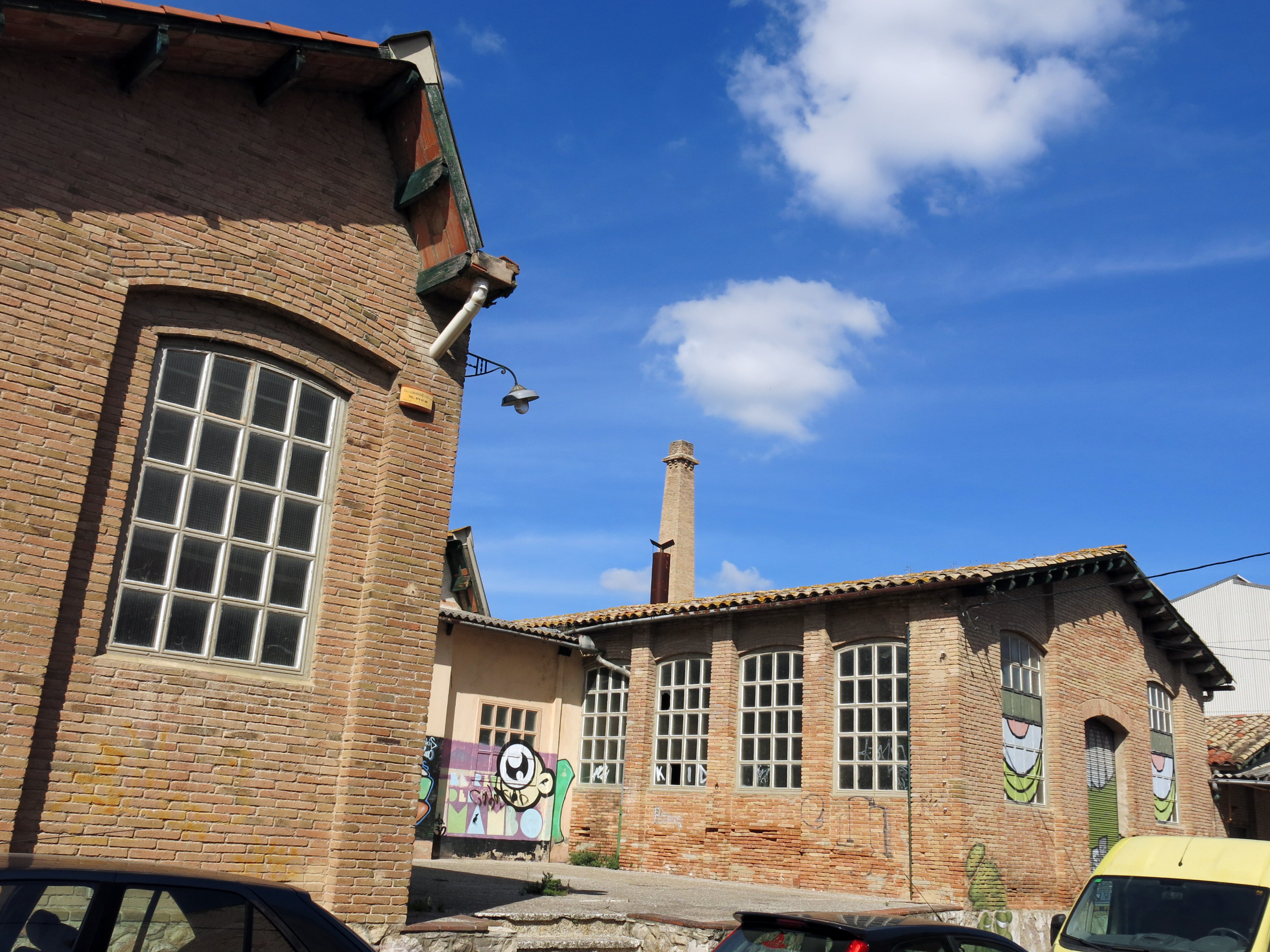
Former textile factory at Centelles

After the union of Castilian and Aragonese Crowns (1479), Catalonia continued as a distinct political entity under the Spanish crown, retaining its political liberties. Nevertheless, there were conflicts with the centre over trade and financial policy, and the Reapers' War of 1640–59 showed the "typical tendencies of Catalan separatism", when Catalonia sought the protection of France, then at war with Spain.

During the War of the Spanish Succession, Catalonia largely supported the claim of the Archduke Charles. The victorious Bourbons soon outlawed many Catalan political and cultural institutions through the Nueva Planta decrees, and Castilian was introduced as official language.

The Renaixença, a Catalan literary and cultural revival, was partly a response to industrialization and was important in the development of modern Catalan identity. A later stage was the development of a distinct form of modernism in the arts and architecture in the period around 1900. The political assertion of what came to be called Catalanisme was spearheaded by the federalist views of Pi y Margall and the republican and progressive views of Valentí Almirall, but it was Prat de la Riba who first formulated a Catalan nationalist programme and helped to found the conservatively oriented Lliga Regionalista, an important political force in the early 20th century. Theirs was a federalist programme providing for a large measure of separation, rather than total independence from Spain. A more right-wing and clericalist strand of Catalan nationalism, following on from Carlist principles, was inspired by Bishop Josep Torras i Bages. A degree of autonomy was obtained in 1913 with the formation of a Mancomunitat, wherein the four provinces of Catalonia were associated for certain functions.

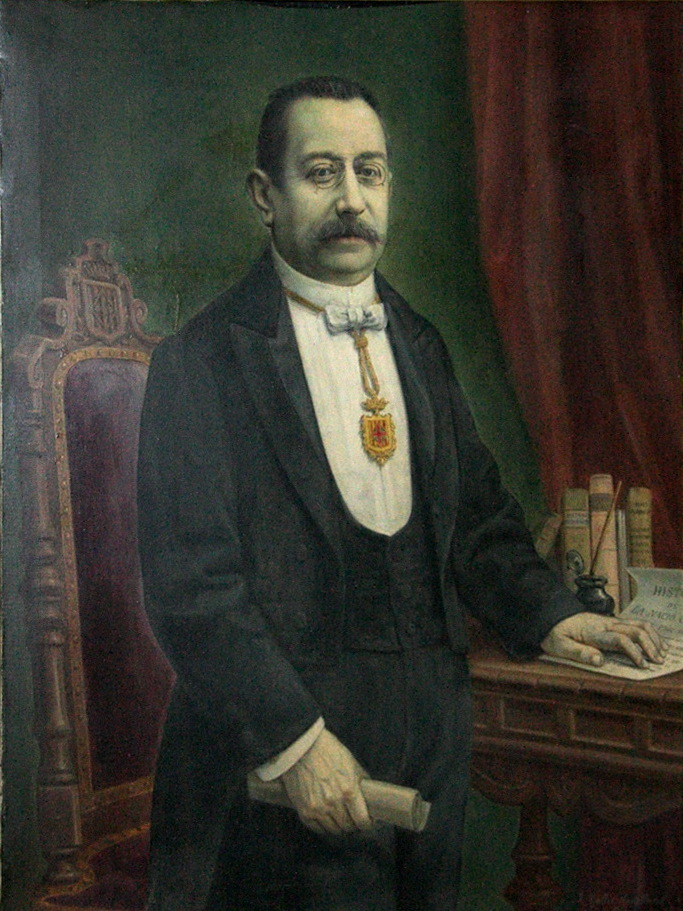
Enric Prat de la Riba, 1870–1917

Under the Second Spanish Republic (1931-1939) Catalonia obtained a Statute of Home Rule in 1932, with a regional administration given the old name of Generalitat, led by the left-wing nationalist party Esquerra Republicana instead of the conservative Lliga. Autonomous government was suppressed upon the victory of the Spanish Nationalists in 1939, to be restored under the 1978 Constitution as the Generalitat de Catalunya. Tension built up following the judicial suspension of parts of a revised Statute of Autonomy in 2010, in particular concerning autonomy in taxation policy and the use of the term "nation". There were massive demonstrations in 2010 and 2012, after which the Catalan government organised independence referendums in 2014 and 2017, the latter forming the basis for the Catalan declaration of independence of 2017.

==== Catalan language ====
The presence of a distinct Catalan language has been seen as the basis for "the claim of Catalonia to be considered as something more than a mere region". As well as in Catalonia, Catalan is spoken in Valencia, the Balearics, and certain adjacent areas of France. It is also the official language of Andorra. The language was prevalent in Catalonia and beyond during the Middle Ages, but "died as a language of culture in the early 16th century", being revived in the 19th century with the Renaixença. The use of the language was restricted under Franco, but since then it has achieved the status of co-official language and has been actively promoted by Catalonia's government.

As of 2011, 95% of the population were able to understand Catalan, and 73% could speak it. In 2007, 32% named Catalan as the primary language that they actually did speak, against 50% for Spanish (Castilian); 7% spoke the two languages equally. The ethnolinguistic composition of the population has been heavily affected by extensive immigration from non-Catalan speaking parts of Spain, much of it associated with rapid growth in industry, since the late 19th century and more particularly between 1950 and 1975.

==== Economy ====
Catalonia, especially Barcelona, was the first part of Spain to industrialize. This early industrialization and the new economic problems associated with it led to even more of a break with the central government and culture. Catalan industrialists often lobbied for trade protection and opposed trade treaties with other countries.

On 2014 figures Catalonia is the fourth wealthiest of Spain's Autonomous Communities.

==== Politics ====
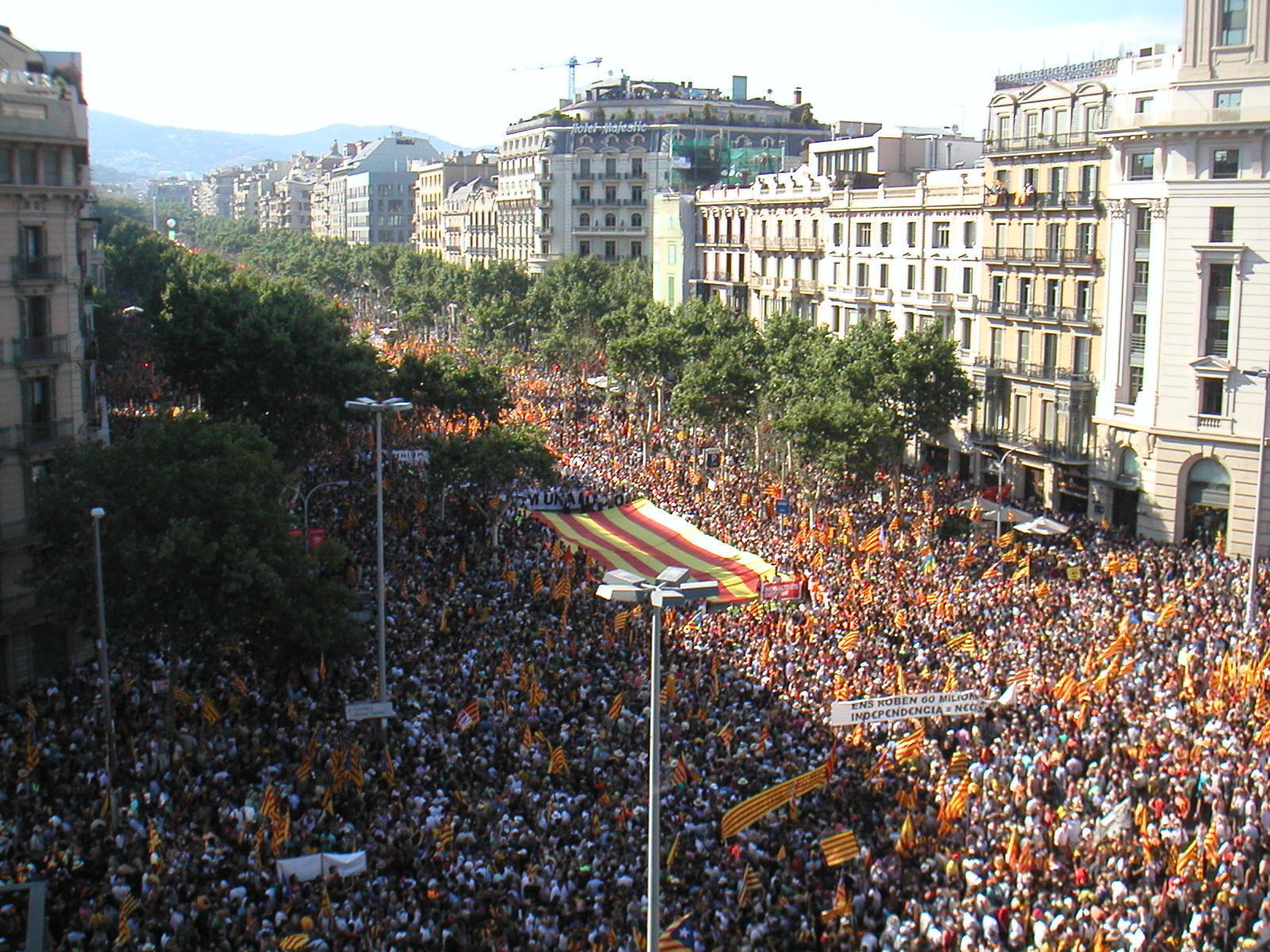
Demonstration on 10 July 2010 (Barcelona), against the ruling by the Constitutional Court of Spain rejecting the new Statute of Autonomy (2006)

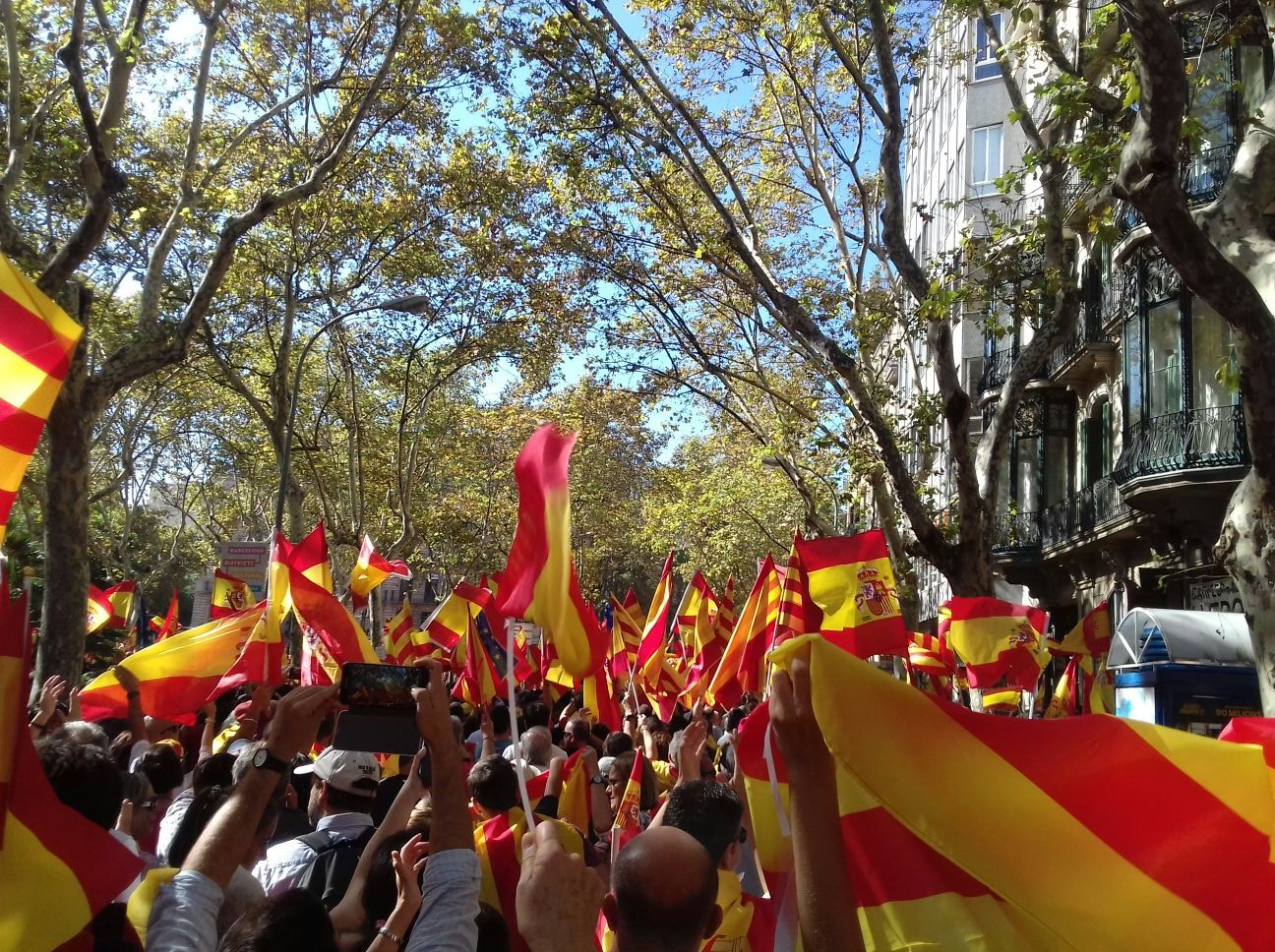
Demonstration in favour of unity with Spain, Barcelona, 10 October 2017

Before the Civil War, followers of the Catalanist Lliga were largely of the middle class, while industrial workers (many of whom did not speak Catalan) were more likely to support either socialism, represented by different political parties and the UGT union, or anarcho-syndicalism (CNT and FAI). A left-wing nationalist party, the Republican Left of Catalonia (Esquerra or ERC) was formed in 1931 and soon grew to overshadow the Lliga.

Upon the restoration of autonomy in the late 1970s, the dominant party in the Catalan parliament was until 2003 the center-right nationalist Convergence and Union (CiU) led by Jordi Pujol. Socialist voters were divided between the pro-independence Esquerra and the non-nationalist Socialists' Party of Catalonia (PSC), the sister party of the PSOE. After a period of rule by a left-wing coalition including both these parties and the eco-socialists, CiU under Artur Mas returned to power in 2010. In the 2015 elections, Junts pel Sí, a pro-independence alliance including CiU, Esquerra and other groups won the largest number of seats, although not an absolute majority. Independence was opposed by most of the PSC and by Catalan arms of the Spanish PP and Citizens parties. During the negotiations to form a new government between Junts pel Sí and the Popular Unity Candidacy (radical left and pro-independence party) after the 2015 elections, Mas was replaced as president by Carles Puigdemont. After the independence bid of October 2017, the Spanish state suspended the Generalitat pending fresh regional elections. When these were held on 21 December they again produced a majority for pro-independence parties, which won 48% of the vote, even though Citizens became the largest single party in Parliament.

Catalonia is among the top 10 regions in Europe on a "regionalism index". According to another survey carried out in 2002, 16% of residents in Catalonia "did not consider themselves Spanish at all" and another 24% identified more strongly with Catalonia than with Spain. The overwhelming majorities for independence in the 2014 and 2017 referendums are dubious as a reflection of overall opinion, owing to low turnout and, in 2017, to police action during the poll. Extensive opinion polling on the issue of independence has taken place in Catalonia. One series of such polls shows that support for independence increased markedly after 2011, and settled around 40% between 2015 and 2017.

===== Catalan Countries =====
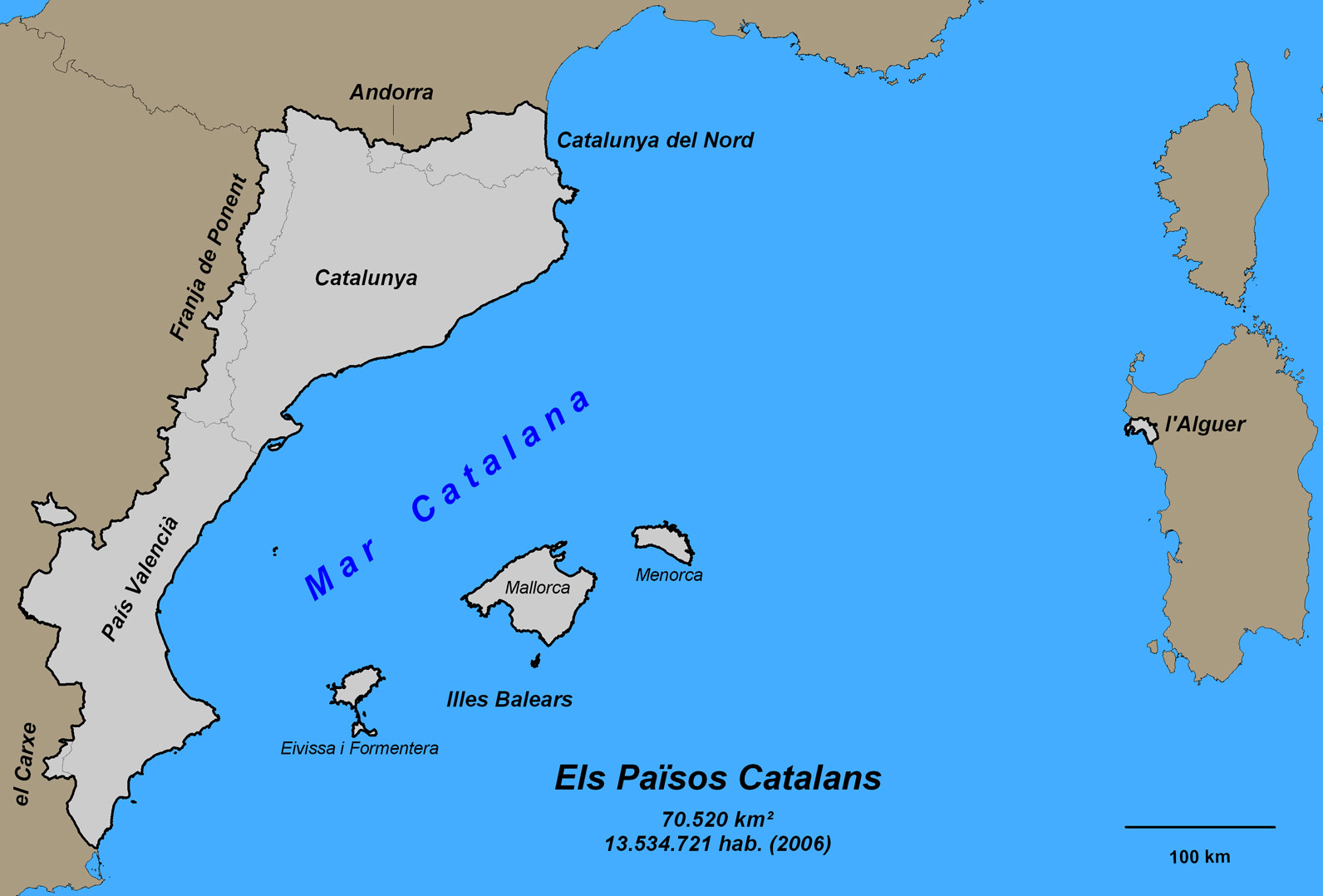
The "Catalan Countries"

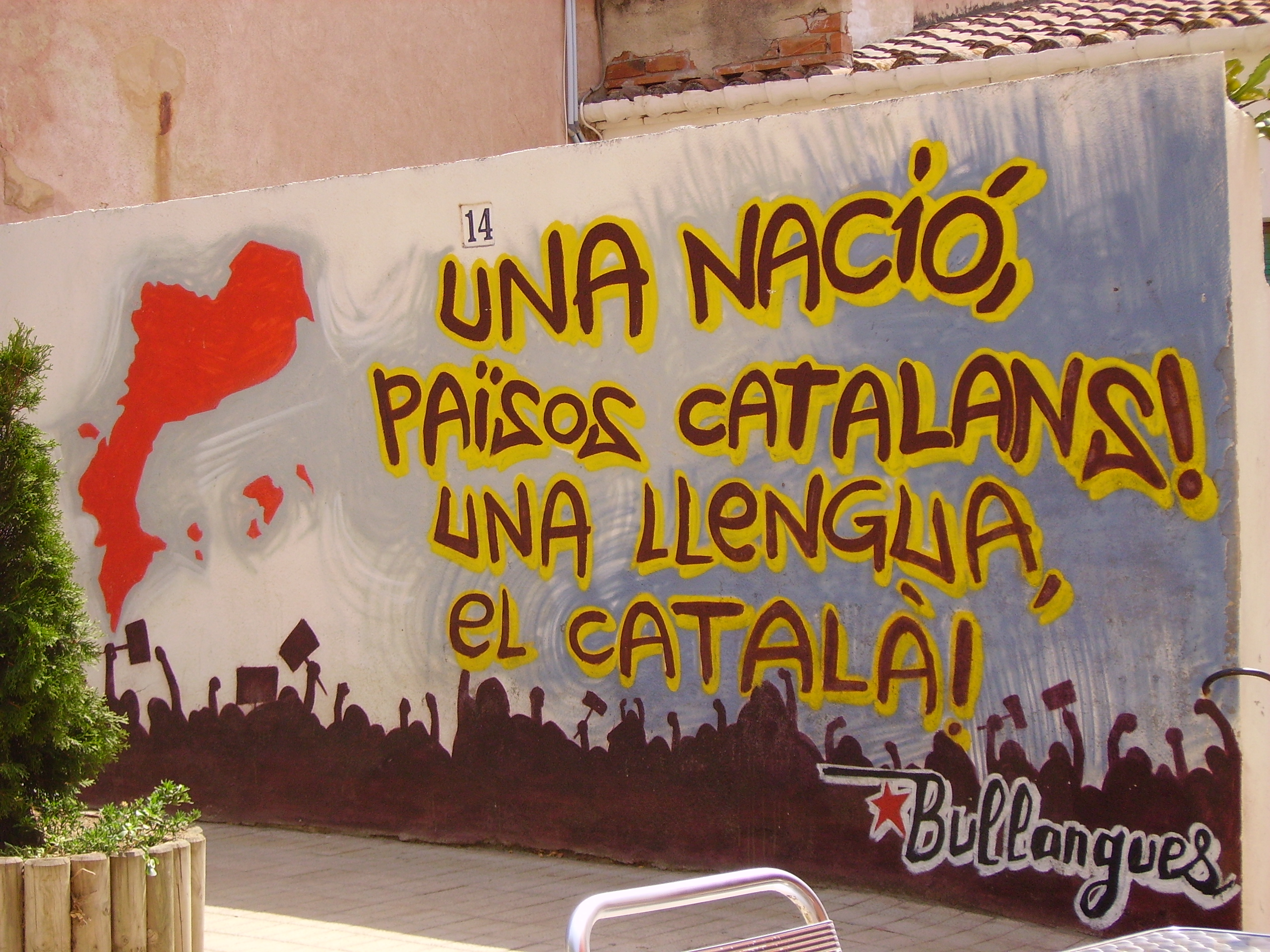
Graffiti in Vilassar de Mar, which reads "One nation, Països Catalans! One language, Catalan!"

Over the past few decades, a concept known as the Catalan Countries (Països Catalans) has developed as a strand of Catalan nationalism advocated by the Valencian writer Joan Fuster. This is the idea that Catalonia, Valencia, the Balearic Islands and a few other places in Spain and in other European countries are united by the fact that they share Catalan as a historic language, and are in this way distinct from the rest of Spain. In Valencia, however, reservations are frequently expressed about being included in this concept.

=== Valencia ===
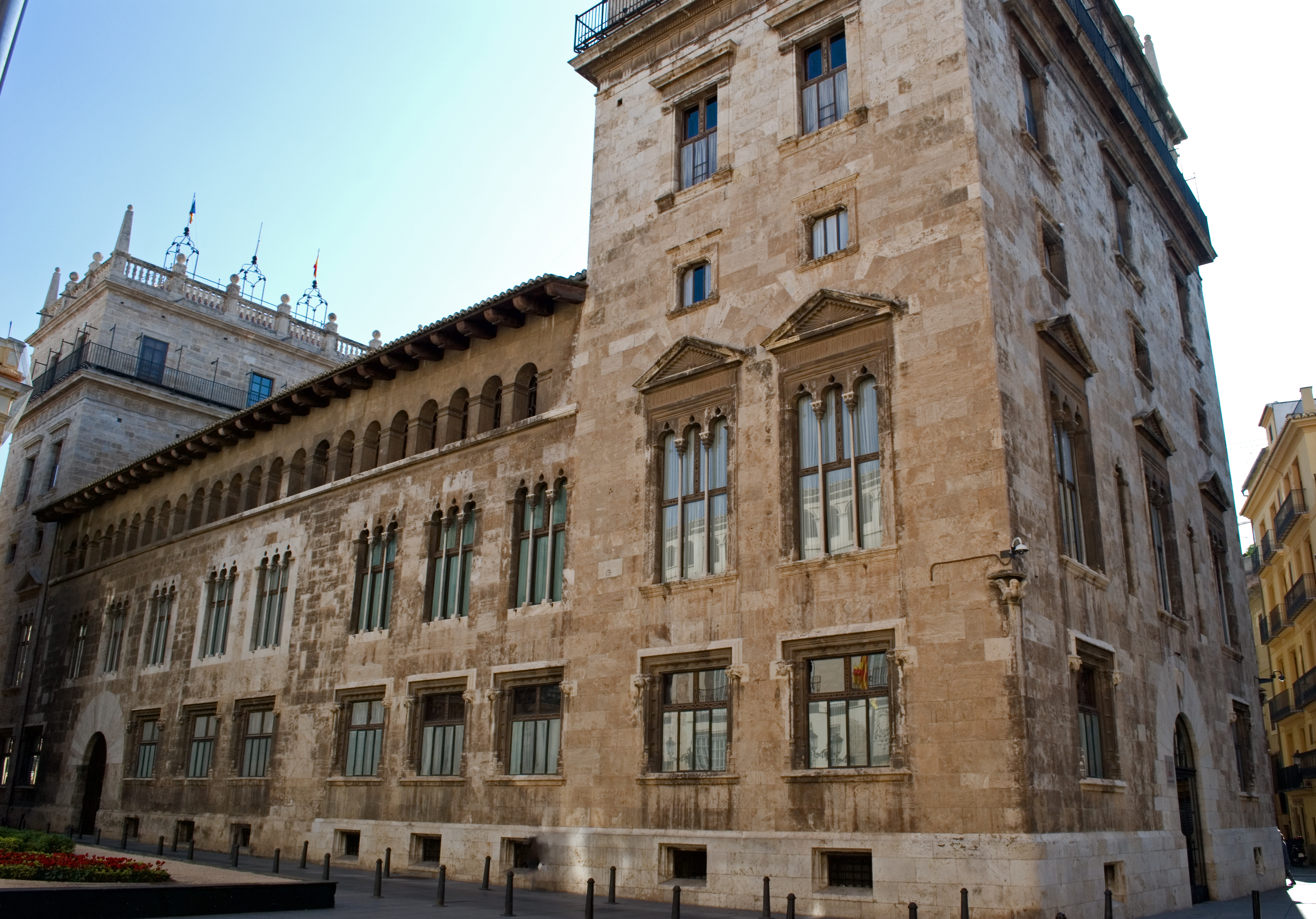
Palau de la Generalitat Valenciana, seat of the Valencian government

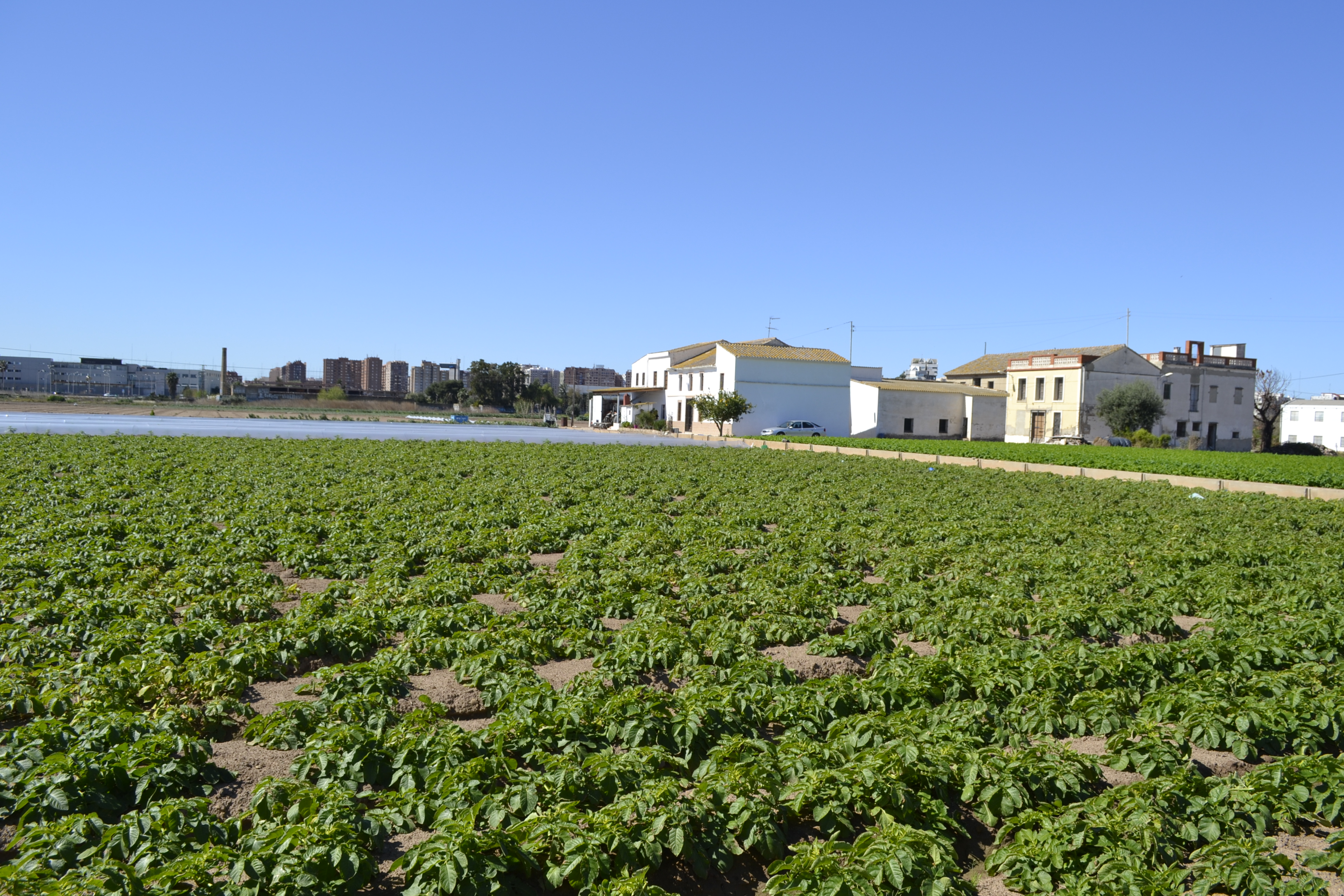
Horta in the province of Valencia

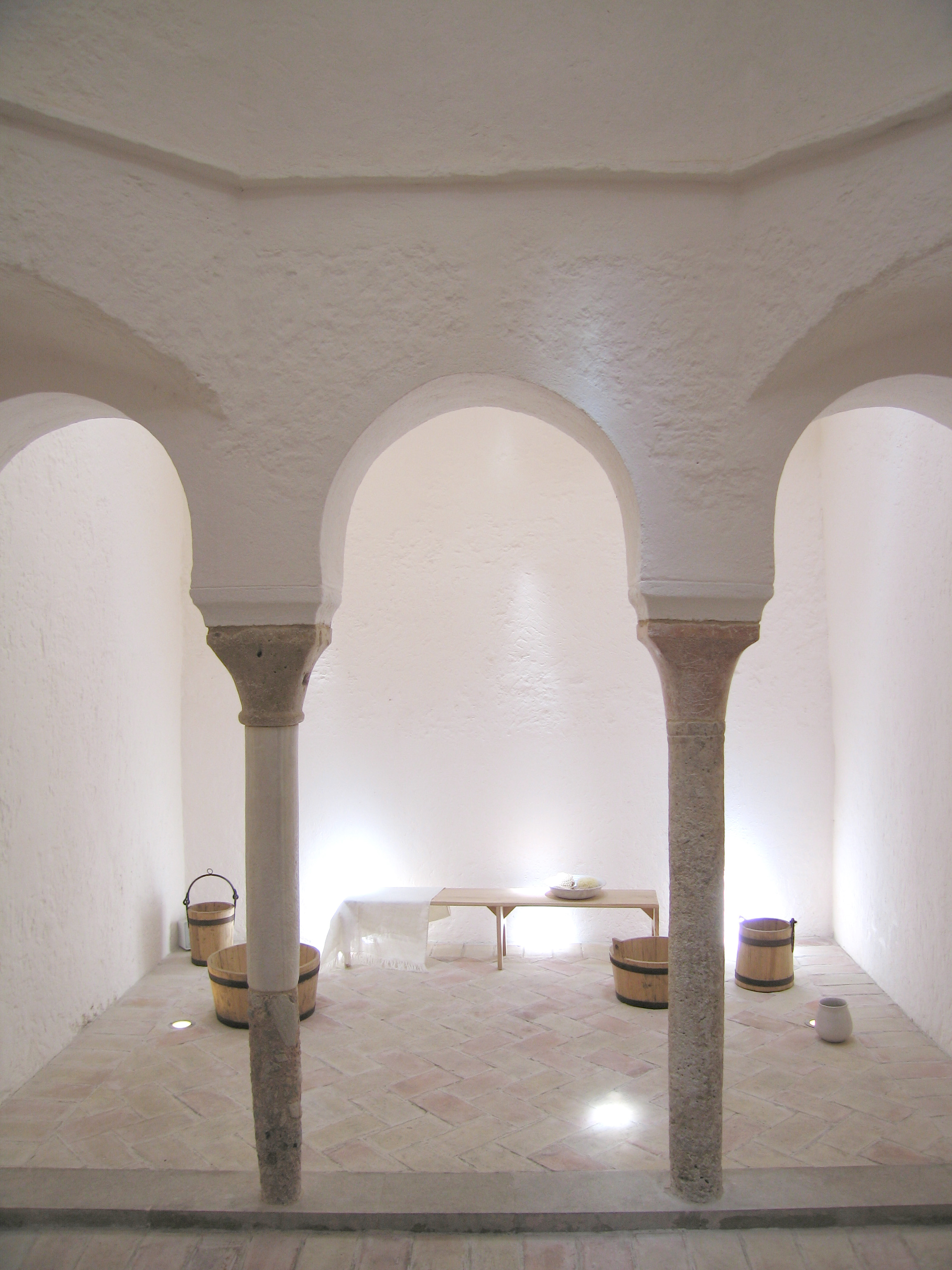
Arab baths of l'Almirall, Valencia

The Valencian Community lies on the Spanish Mediterranean coast. The coastal plain or horta is well-irrigated and agriculturally productive, while the inland mountainous areas are much poorer. The region consists of the provinces of Valencia (with the capital and largest city of Valencia), Castellón, and Alicante.

The present-day Valencian Community is identified with the historic Kingdom of Valencia, which became a Catalan-speaking part of the Crown of Aragon when it was conquered from the Arabs in the 13th century. The Crown of Aragon instituted a form of independent government in Valencia similar to what already existed in the Kingdom of Aragon and in Catalonia. The Kingdom of Valencia reached a height of population and economic power at that time. Valencia retained a high Muslim, Arabic-speaking population for long after the Aragonese conquest, giving Valencia a strong bi-religious, bi-lingual character. Valencia from this period is marked by a distinctive form of Morisco architecture and many gardens. Anti-Muslim feeling among the Christians contributed to the Revolt of the Germanías (1519–23) against the Spanish Crown. This revolt was particular to one region and did attempt to overturn the social order, but it did not call upon regional identity even though it later became part of the regional historical narrative. It was followed by forced conversions of the Muslims and their expulsion in 1609. This represented the loss of up to one third of the population of the Kingdom of Valencia and removed a large part of the agricultural labor force.

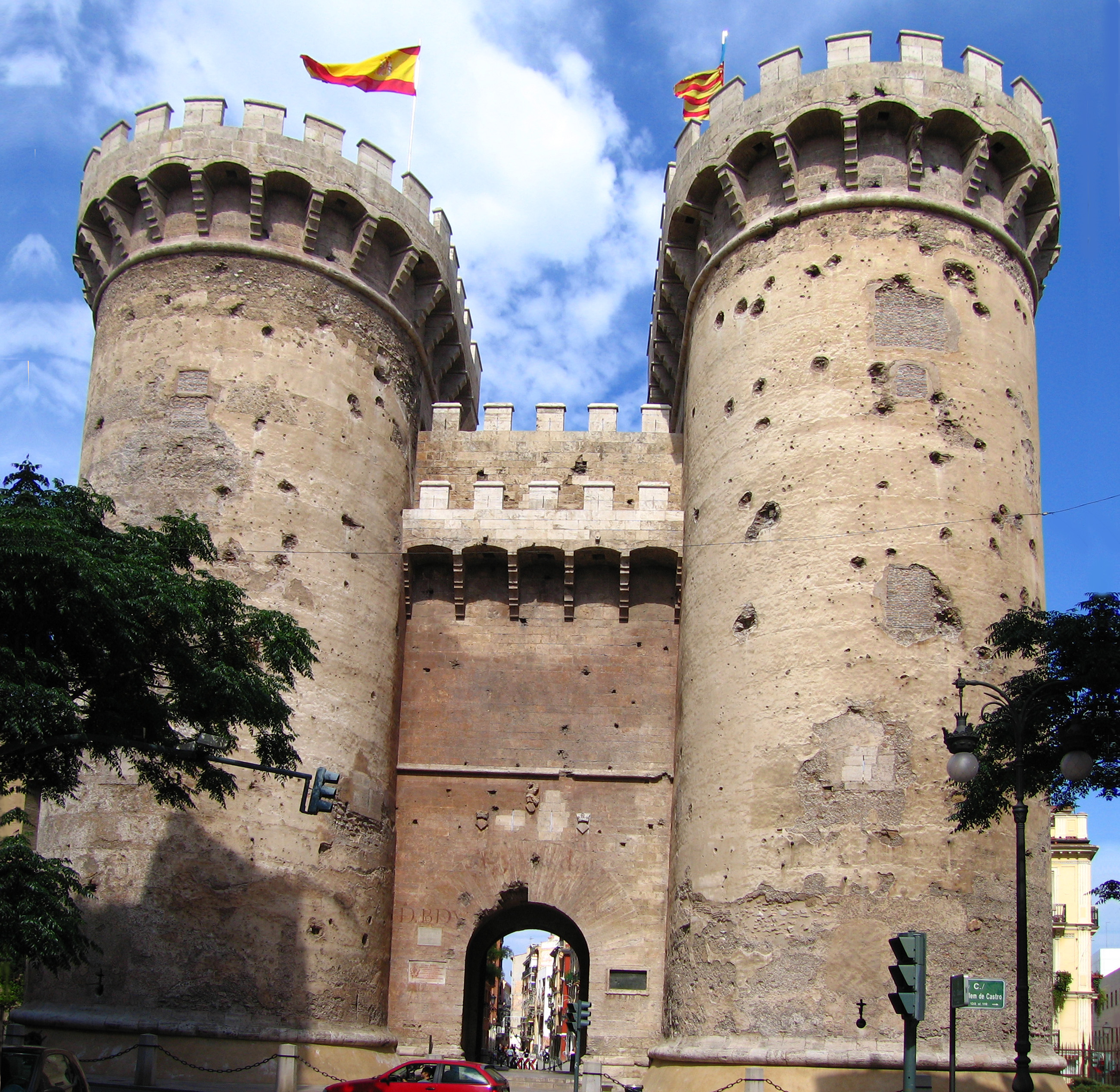
Quart Towers, city of Valencia

Valencia remained an independent state under the Crown of Castile, governed by its own parliament (the Corts Valencianes) according to its own charters (the Furs of Valencia), until 1707, when the Nueva Planta decrees abolished the Kingdom of Valencia and subordinated it to the Kingdom of Castile and its laws and customs. It was during the 19th century that concepts of a Valencian identity re-emerged, under the influence of the Catalan-language Renaixença. In the political sphere, the conservative Catholic es:Derecha Regional Valenciana ("Valencian Regional Right") party was founded in 1930. Its ideology was autonomist, and it was the first conservative political party active specifically in the Valencian region.

In 1977, after Franco's dictatorship, Valencia began to recover its autonomy with the creation of the Council of the Valencian Country (Consell del País Valencià), and in 1982 a Statute of Autonomy created several self-government institutions under the Generalitat Valenciana and established Valencian as a co-official language. The first democratically elected President, Joan Lerma, took office in 1982 as part of the transition to autonomy. The Statute, as reformed in 2006, recalls the foral civil law, while it also recognizes Valencia as a nationality.

Valencian (both a variety and an alternative name of the Catalan language) is spoken alongside Spanish in around two thirds of the territory of the Valencian Community and in most of the more densely populated coastal areas. It is not commonly used in some inland areas and in the far south, and its use has declined in the two main cities of Alicante and Valencia. According to a 2010 survey 48% of respondents said they speak Valencian "perfectly" or "quite well", and for 32% it was the language most commonly used at home.

Nationalist sentiment is not widespread and most of the population do not consider themselves more Valencian than Spanish. Valencian regionalism marked with anti-Catalan sentiment is also called Valencianism or blaverism. Its adherents consider Valencian to be distinct from Catalan and called for the Autonomous Community to be named "Kingdom of Valencia", as opposed to the term País Valencià which may imply an identification with the Països Catalans or Catalan Countries. Only a minor tendency within Valencianism proposed independence for Valencia from both Catalonia and Spain.

After the restoration of democracy Valencian nationalism or regionalism was at first represented politically by the Valencian People's Union and the more conservative, blaverist Valencian Union. These were superseded by the Valencian Nationalist Bloc (BNV, founded 1998). BNV has favoured cooperation and ties with the other Catalan speaking territories and greater autonomy – if not independence itself – from Spain, in form of the Països Catalans. It polled at 4–8% in regional elections until in 2011 it joined in an electoral alliance, the Compromís coalition, which gained 18% of the vote in the 2015 regional election and entered the regional government in coalition with the Socialist Party. The Compromís coalition focuses on fighting corruption, and has significantly reduced its nationalist discourse in order to gain wider appeal among Valencian voters and has been often accused of camouflaging its ideology. Electoral support for nationalism is greatest in an area split between two provinces: the southern end of the Valencia province and the northern end of Alicante province. Nationalist parties hold several town councils, mostly in the areas mentioned above.

=== Balearic Islands ===
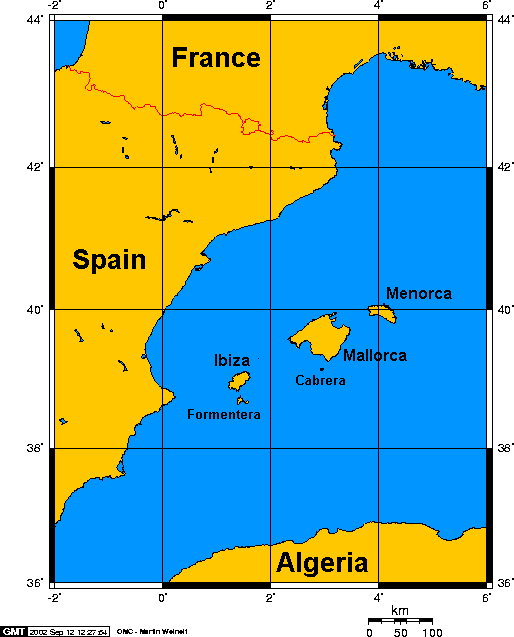
Location of the Balearic Islands in relation to Spain

Consisting of four main inhabited islands – Mallorca, Menorca, Ibiza (Eivissa in Catalan language) and Formentera – off the coast of Catalonia and Valencia, the Balearic Islands comprise one province and an Autonomous Community of Spain. The islands were under Muslim control until 1229–35, when they were conquered by King James I of Aragon and constituted as a Kingdom of Majorca, subordinate to Aragon. Menorca came under British control for most of the 18th century as a result of the 1713 Treaty of Utrecht.

Over 70% of the inhabitants of the Balearic Islands speak dialects of Catalan, which is the co-official language in the region. It is more used in rural zones than in the capital or in places with a high density of tourists. Balearic Catalan has developed into various dialectal variants (for example "mallorquí"). Each island has its own dialect, and the four most populated islands each has its own Island Council known as Consell Insular as a tier of local government.

The islanders took an interest in the Catalan Renaixença and produced some Catalan literature, but this then largely rural, conservative society did not participate in the political movements of the time. Since the Franco period there has been a renewal of awareness of a Balearic identity centred on the language. Some in the Balearic Islands, including former regional president José Ramón Bauzà, argue that the Balearic dialects are actually separate languages and not dialects of Catalan. Bauzà took steps in 2012 to reduce the predominance of Catalan in the education system, provoking a large demonstration and a teachers' strike. "The issue of language is an ongoing problem that is driving a wedge between the cultural and political divisions of the community". On Mallorca there is a sense of a dual Catalan and Spanish identity, added to "a third sense of cultural identity, that of being Mallorcan". The large number of incomers from northern Europe largely accept the local identity, tending towards the broader Catalan-speaking identity, as that is easier to acquire than that of a particular island.

In the 2015 regional election an alliance of the nationalist parties Més per Mallorca and Més per Menorca ("More for ...") won 15% of the vote, entering into a coalition government with PSOE and Podemos. At the time Més per Mallorca appeared to be prioritising social and ecological concerns above questions of sovereignty. Another 8% went to Proposta per les Illes (El Pi), an autonomist party that aims to promote the Catalan language and the culture and traditions of the islands; this party remained in opposition after the election.

=== Aragon ===
Location of Aragon in Spain

The three provinces making up the present-day Autonomous Community of Aragon roughly coincide with the former Kingdom of Aragon, up to the early 18th century a discrete entity within the wider Crown of Aragon. The irrigated Ebro valley contrasts with mountainous areas of low rainfall, marked in the past by rural poverty, a stronghold of anarcho-syndicalism in the earlier 20th century and, in the Maestrazgo, of Carlism in the 19th century.

Aragon, like Catalonia, maintained much of its independence under the Crown of Castile, up to the point of a revolt in 1591–1592 over their regional rights and independence. The region retained significant Arab influence after the expulsion, particularly in the Ebro valley to the south, although leaving less trace architecturally than in Valencia.

Aragon has its own language, Aragonese, with about 25,000 speakers, mainly in the mountainous north while Castilian is spoken in the southern two-thirds and Catalan is spoken along the eastern strip. Because of the prevalence of Castilian and the presence of Catalan, the language does not play as large a role in Aragonese identity as in some other locations, but it does enjoy some official recognition.

Most of Aragon's population does not seek an independent state; but there is a strong regional identification and considerable support for increased autonomy. In addition to the Spanish-based political parties, there are a number of Aragon-based parties. Two parties with significant electoral support are the Chunta Aragonesista (CHA), a left-wing Aragonese nationalist party, and the Aragonese Party (PAR), more regionalist and conservative. In the regional election of 2015, PAR received 6.9% of votes and CHA, 4.6%. Supporters of independence are represented by Puyalón de Cuchas, Estado Aragonés and other parties.

== Northern and northwestern Spain ==
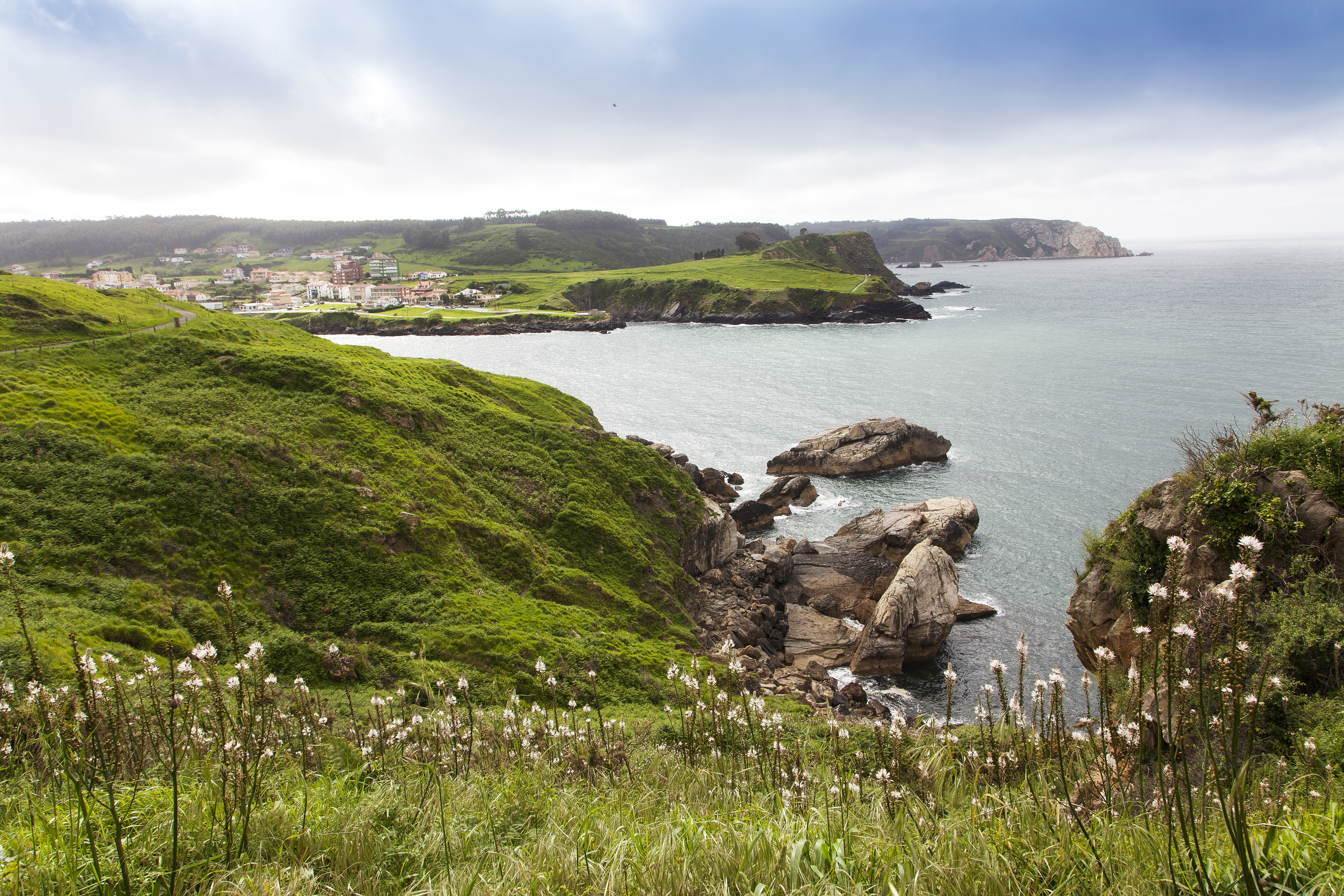
The north coast at Castrillón, Asturias

The coastal strip on the Bay of Biscay, to the north of the Cordillera Cantábrica, has a climate distinct from that of most of Spain, with abundant rainfall and cool summers. For this it is called España Verde (Green Spain), and broadly includes the regions of Basque Country, Navarre, Cantabria, Asturias, and Galicia.

As has already been mentioned, the northern territories for the most part share a similar pattern of identity development. Each region has its own language or distinct dialect, most of which derive from different dialects from the early Reconquista. Most of these regions were largely independent of Muslim rule and continuously shifted between Christian kings during the Reconquista, sometimes being split between three or four kingdoms, but at other times being entirely united. Eventually, the Christian territory expanded far enough for Portugal to break from Galicia, which shortly afterwards united with León. After that, the Reconquista in all parts except for Valencia was carried out by Portugal, León, and Castile. From this point on, all of the northern territories west of Navarre were under the Castilian Crown, which attempted to centralize more and more. Despite that increasing centralization, which united some of the judicial and governmental structures with those of Castile over time and which promoted increased castilianization of the upper classes, the regions in northern Spain still retained and recreated their own regional identities.

=== The Basque Country ===
==== Geography ====
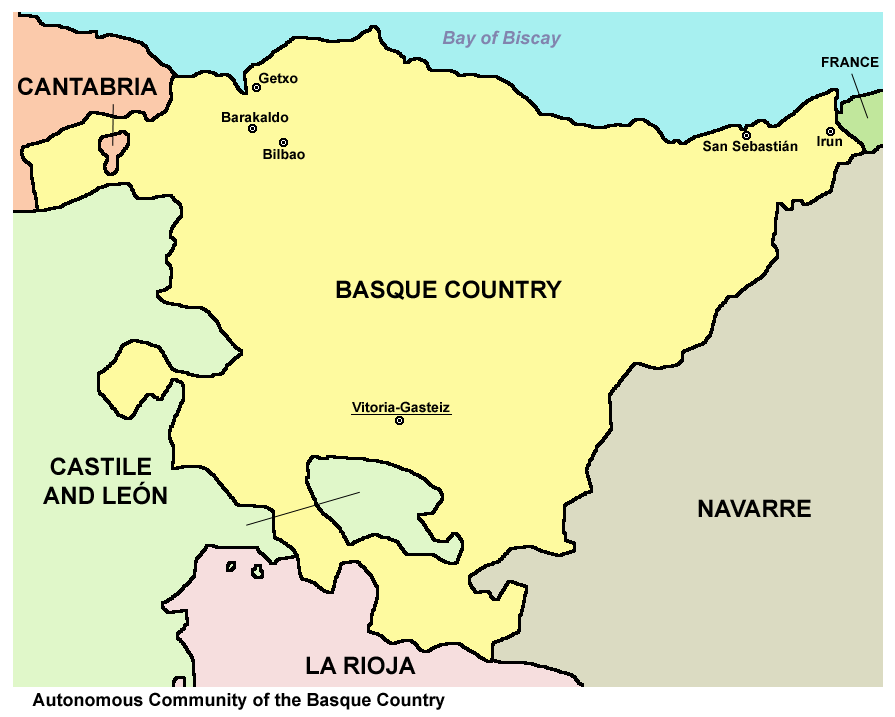
Map of the Basque Country

The Basque Country in its larger sense is composed of the present-day Autonomous Community, Navarre, and the Northern Basque Country in France. The Autonomous Community itself comprises three provinces: Araba (Álava), Gipuzkoa (Guipúzcoa), and Bizkaia (Vizcaya, Biscay). Navarre chooses to remain outside the Autonomous Community of the Basque Country.

Much of the country between the coast and the Ebro Valley is mountainous. Gipuzkoa and Biscay, on the coast, are separated from the rest of Spain by the lofty Cantabrian Mountains, while Navarre is oriented inland towards Castile. Economically important features include the iron ore deposits of Biscay, the concentration of industry around the largest city of Bilbao, the Port of Bilbao, and a land communication route with France around the western end of the Pyrenees.

==== History ====
The Ikurriña, flag of the Basque Country

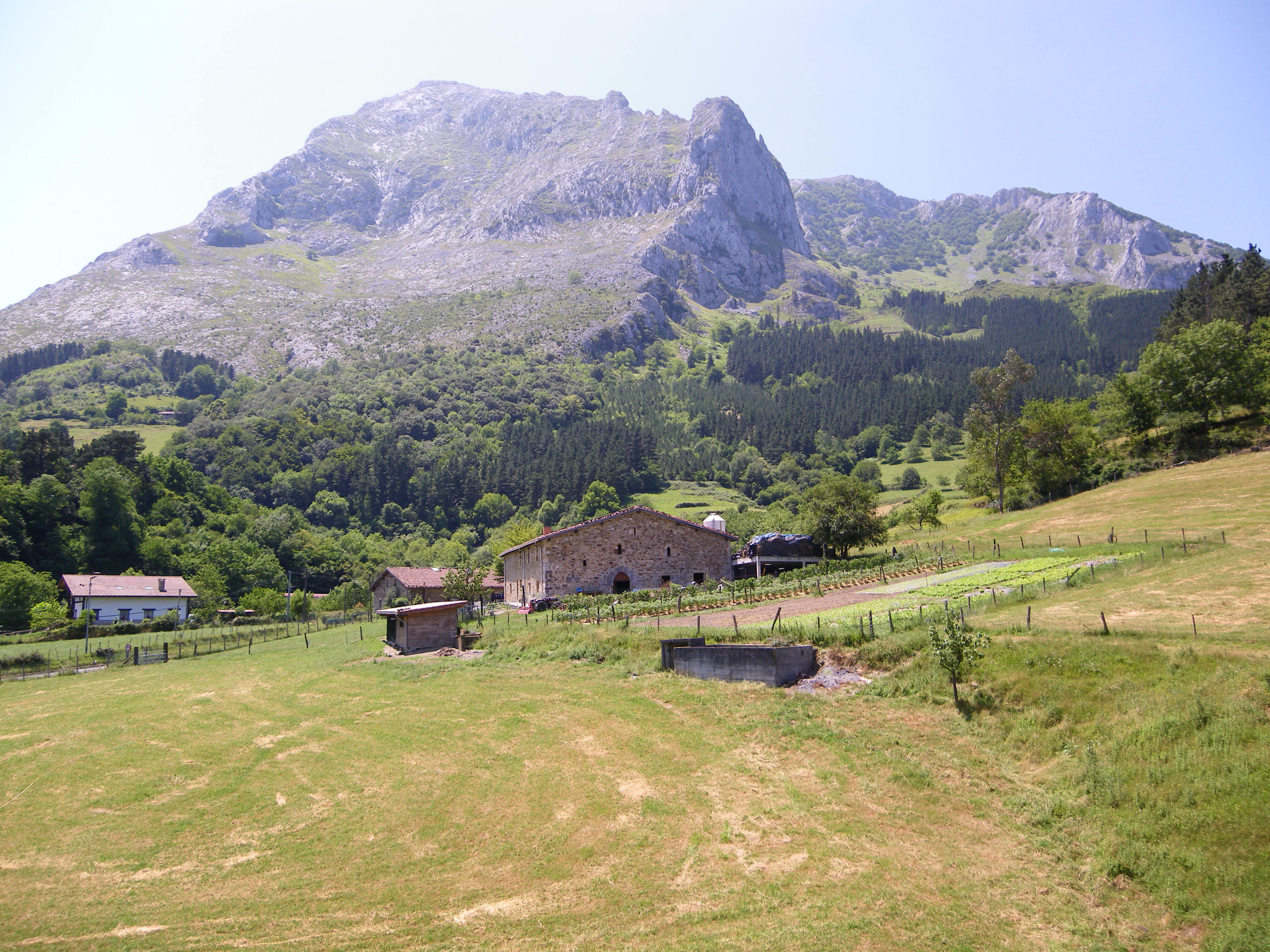
Urrutia farmhouse, under the hills of Anboto. Atxondo, Bizkaia, Euskal Herria

Records of people and place names from Roman times indicate that the Basques occupied an area somewhat larger than that which they currently inhabit, and supported a claim by Sabino Arana, the traditional founder of Basque Nationalism, that the Basque homeland has been occupied by the Basques longer than any other part of France or Spain has been inhabited by their people.

Like other northern regions, the Basque territories remained independent, Christian kingdoms, occupying a central position within Christian Iberia. The Basque territories were for a time united within the Kingdom of Pamplona. The three present Spanish Basque provinces were incorporated into the Kingdom of Castile at the end of the 12th century, yet retained substantial local rights and privileges (fueros).

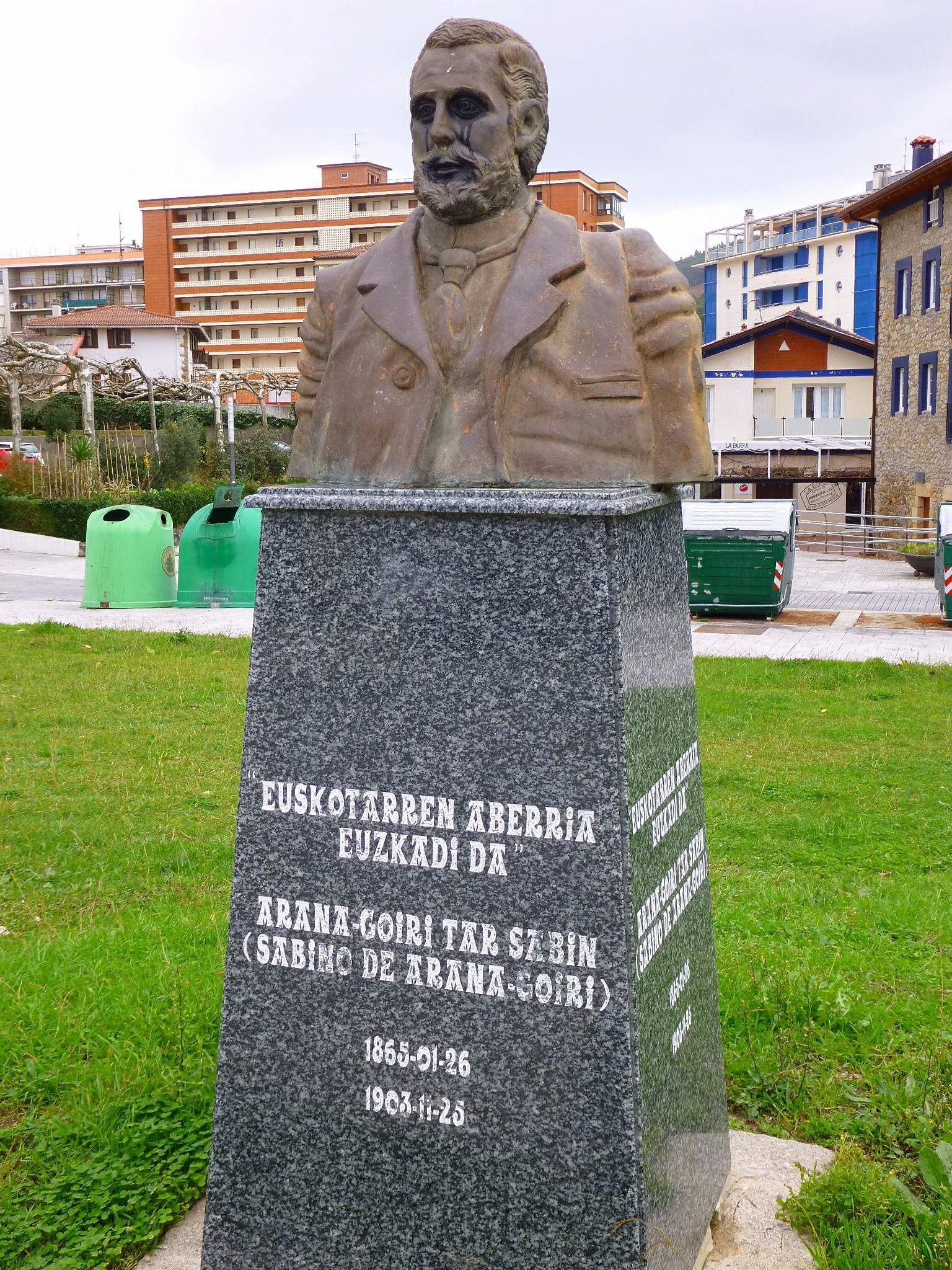
Monument to Sabino de Arana (1865–1903)

The Basque Country was one of the main centres of 19th-century Carlism, which opposed the reigning monarchy and was defeated in a series of wars. Modern Basque nationalism originated during this period. "Basque nationalism was a true peasant nationalism" with not so much of a cultural and literary basis by comparison with Catalonia. At first known as "foralism", the movement was more focused on reclaiming the liberties lost after the First Carlist War (1833–40) and after the Third Carlist War in 1875, although even then the Basques retained control over taxation and "a high measure of home rule". Basque nationalism was codified under the leadership of Sabino de Arana, who founded the Basque Nationalist Party (PNV) in 1894. Arana's aim was a completely independent Basque state, known by the new term Euzkadi, based around the Basque language. The movement's outlook at that time was strongly Catholic and anti-liberal, but distinct from Carlism, which was strongest in Navarre and sought to change the whole Spanish state: Basque nationalism then was "more explicitly racial" than its Catalan counterpart, as a response to the large numbers of incomers then arriving from elsewhere in Spain to join the growing industrial workforce.

Basque Nationalists opposed the creation of the Second Republic in 1931. A Statute of Basque Home Rule in 1932 was put to a referendum and rejected in Navarre, but accepted in the other three Spanish Basque provinces (narrowly in Álava, overwhelmingly in the other two). However, under the right-wing government of the day it was never fully implemented. This and other grievances led the Basques to resist Franco's forces during the Civil War. Under the subsequent Franco regime regional self-rule was suppressed and the public use of the Basque language was forbidden.

The ETA group was founded during the Franco period in 1959. Its platform was militant Basque nationalism, and in contrast to the PNV its policy was Marxist and anti-religious. Starting in 1968, ETA carried out a campaign of bombing, assassinations and kidnappings throughout Spain. Among those assassinated, in 1973, was Luis Carrero Blanco, the Spanish president under Franco. ETA violence reached its peak during the transition to democracy of the late 1970s. Some ETA activists were themselves assassinated by paramilitary groups such as Grupos Antiterroristas de Liberación (GAL) during the 1970s and 1980s. Support for ETA's violence later fell away and the group ended its armed campaign after declaring a ceasefire in 2010.

Under the 1978 Constitution the Basque Country again obtained a Statute of Autonomy (Gernika Statute), forming the Basque Autonomous Community, defined as a nationality. Navarre again declined to join the Basque entity. In 2003, Basque president Juan José Ibarretxe proposed a plan that would have changed the current status of the Basque Country to a "status of free association". It was approved 39-35 by the Basque Parliament, but the Spanish Congress of Deputies rejected it 29–313 in 2005, thus halting the progress of the reform. In September 2007 Ibarretxe declared that a referendum on independence would be held on 25 October 2008, but it was declared illegal and forbidden by the Constitutional Court.

==== Demographics and language ====
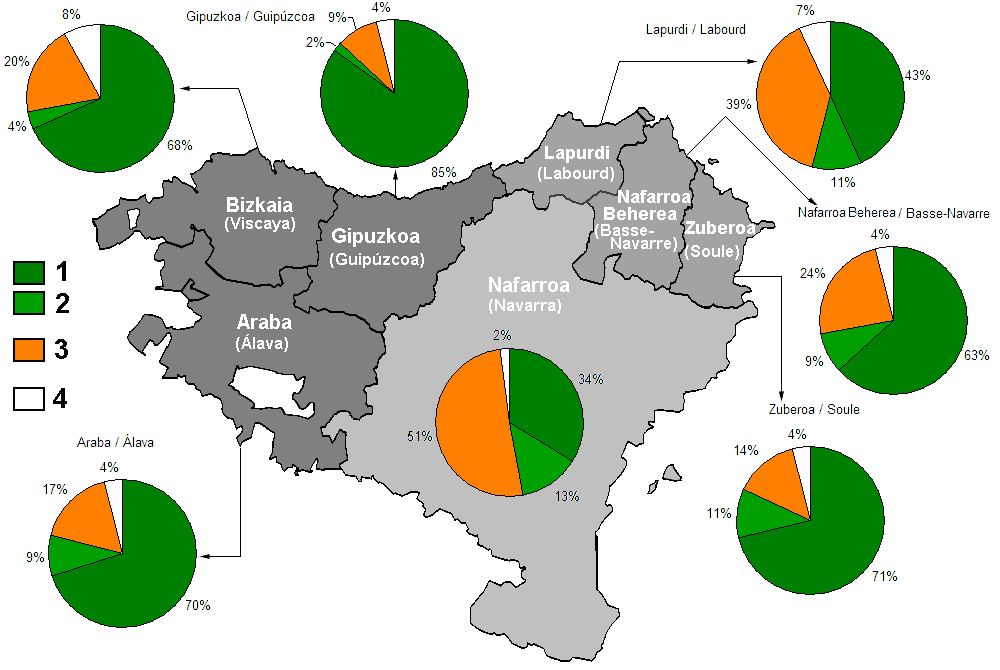
2008 survey of self-identity in the Basque Country

Industrial development since the late 19th century led to large-scale immigration of workers from other parts of Spain. It was estimated in 1998 that 30% of the population in the Basque Country Autonomous Community were born in other regions of Spain and that 40% of the people living in that territory did not have a Basque parent.

A significant aspect of Basque identity is the unique language (Basque: Euskara) which is not related to any other known language. In 2011, 32% of people in the Autonomous Community were recorded as "bilingual" in Basque and Spanish, and another 17% could understand Basque but not speak it well. Knowledge of Basque appeared to be increasing with time and in the younger age groups.

Basque has the status of co-official language in the Autonomous Community, and is being promoted through the education system and in other ways. Use of Basque is concentrated in Gipuzcoa, eastern and central Biscay, and the north of Alava, and also in the northern half of Navarre. Within this area there are different dialects of Basque. A standard Basque language was developed in the 1960s aiming to minimise problems arising from dialectic variation.

==== Economy ====
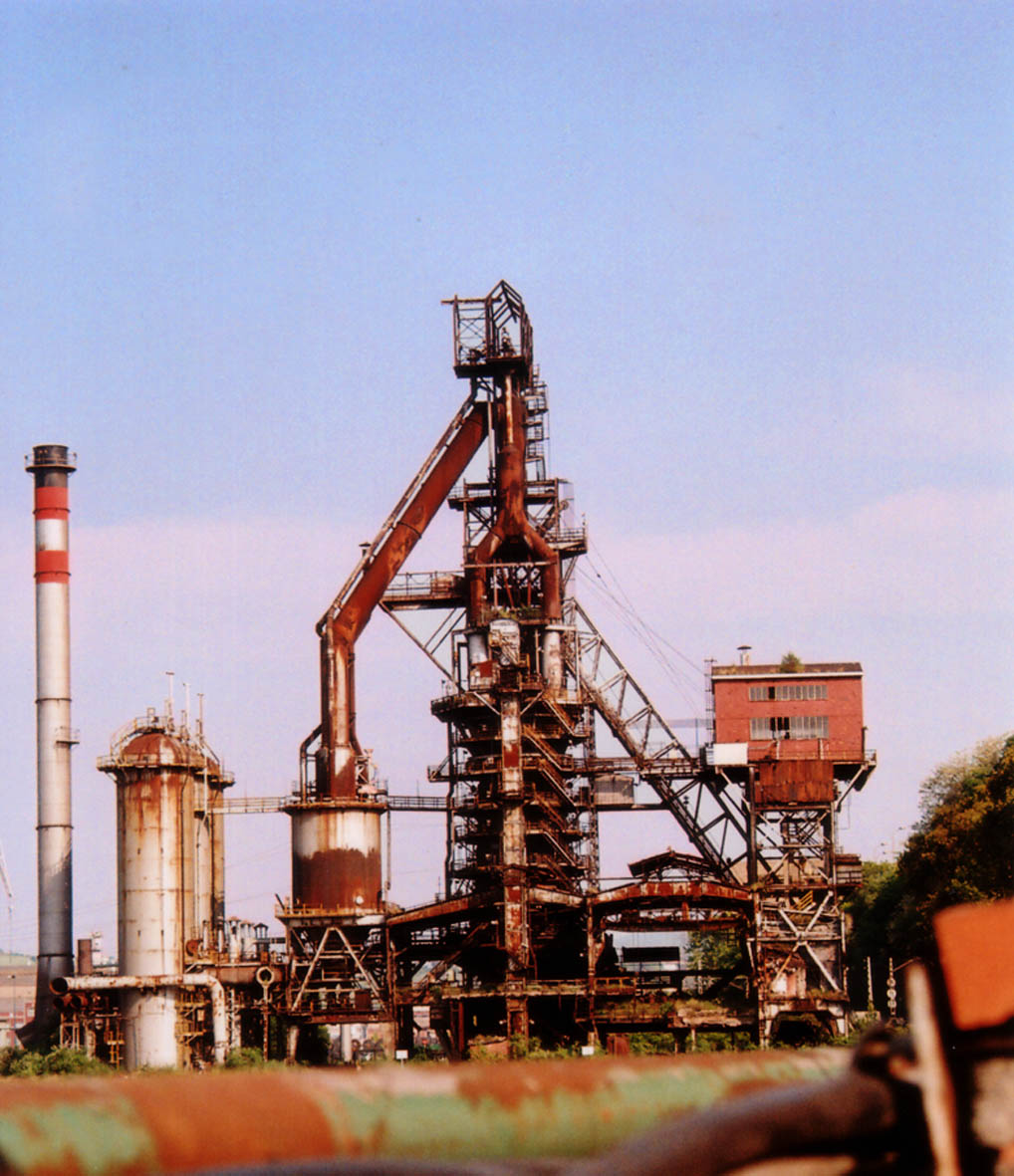
Old blast furnace at Sestao, Biscay

Up to the 20th century the Basque country supported a "stable traditional rural society" with small farms kept as a single unit within families, often living on the land rather than in agrarian villages as in other parts of Spain. The Basques also engaged in fishing, marine trade, and finally industrial development based on iron deposits (late 19th century). The region followed Catalonia in becoming one of the leading industrial areas of Spain.

On 2014 figures the Basque Country is the second wealthiest of Spain's Autonomous Communities.

==== Politics ====
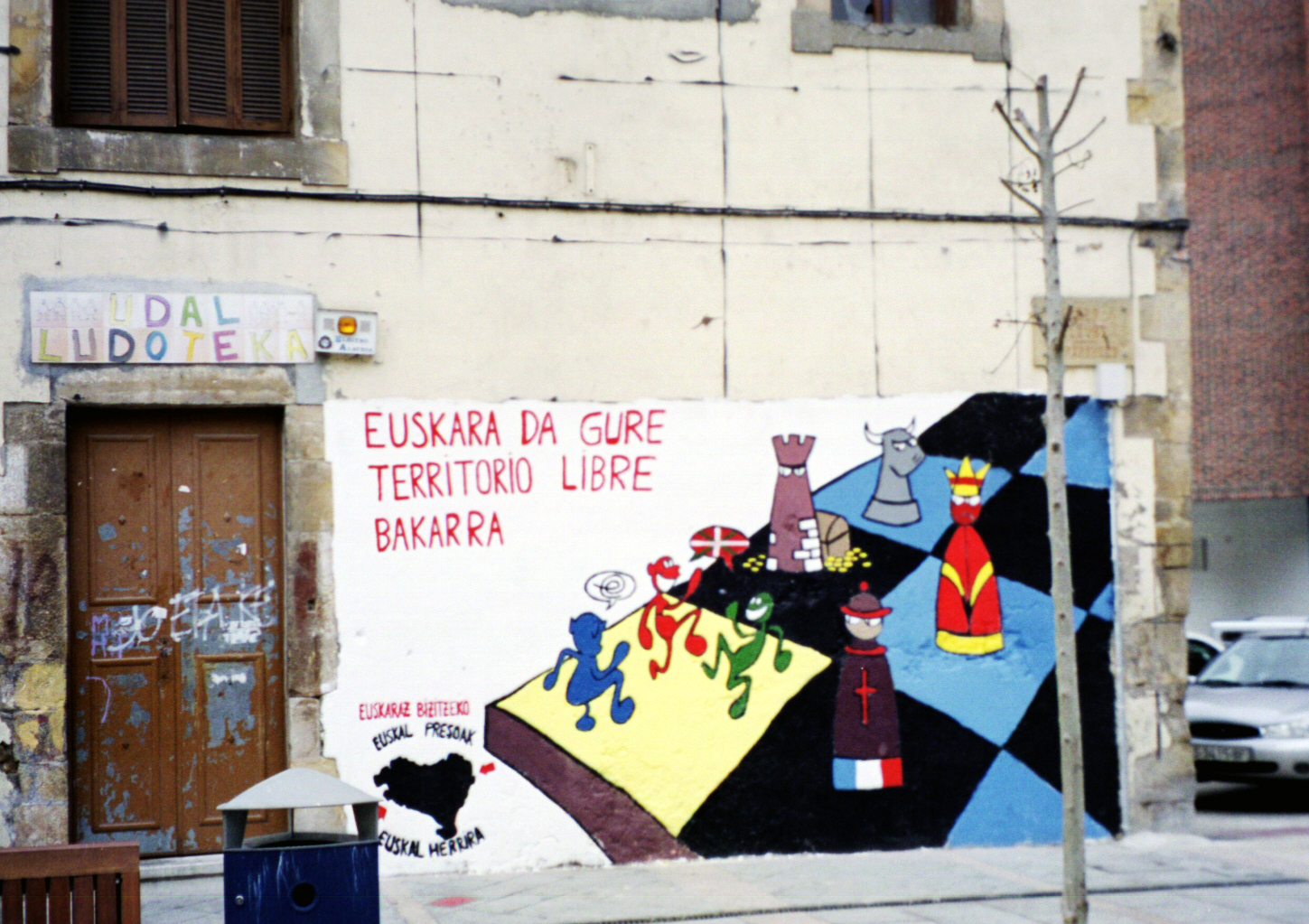
Basque nationalist mural in Mondragón, Gipuzkoa. ("Basque language is our only land of freedom")

Social survey analysis has indicated a high level of regional identification in the Basque Country, the topmost "regionalist region" in Europe. In a 2002 survey, almost a quarter of residents "did not consider themselves Spanish at all". According to a survey published in 2016, 31% of Basques would vote for independence in a referendum, and 39% against. The proportion considering themselves nationalists was 46%, a figure that had decreased since 2005. Among the declared nationalists, fewer supported total independence than some form of continued association with Spain in an autonomous or federal system.

The oldest and largest of the Basque nationalist parties is the Basque Nationalist Party (PNV, EAJ). Its position is Christian-democrat and it calls for self-determination and eventual independence. The PNV has regularly won elections at municipal, regional or Spanish levels in the Basque Country.

The Batasuna party, whose aims were aligned with those of ETA, generally received 10% to 20% of the vote in the Basque Autonomous Community until it was banned in 2003. Since then, other left-wing, pro-independence parties or coalitions have come to prominence: Amaiur and later EH Bildu.

In the regional elections in 2016, the two leading parties were both supporters of Basque nationalism. PNV won 37% of the vote and 28 seats out of the 75 in the Basque Parliament, and EH Bildu won 21% of the vote and 18 seats. The remaining seats were won by the Basque wings of big parties active throughout Spain: PP, PSOE and Podemos.

=== Navarre ===
Navarre borders the Basque Country, but its southern parts more resemble Castile in terrain, climate and agriculture.

At its greatest extent around 1000, the Kingdom of Navarre embraced the present-day Basque Country and other areas in what are now Castile, Aragon and France. In contrast with the other Basque provinces, Navarre remained independent until it was militarily conquered by Castile in the 16th century. The Spanish monarchy allowed Spanish Navarre, like the Basque Country, to retain its fueros (traditional customs and laws). These were subsequently restricted, but never abolished. Navarre suffered less separatism than places like Catalonia, and in return for its support for the Bourbons during the War of the Spanish Succession it was allowed to retain its special status and institutions up to the First Carlist War. Traditionally Navarre has been a "conservative, stable rural society", staunchly Catholic, a main base of 19th-century Carlism, and the only province to have supported Franco's rising in 1936, after which it was again allowed some special status.

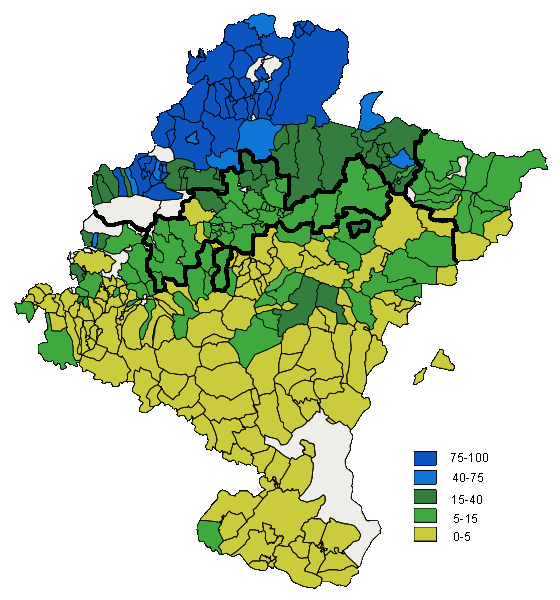
Distribution of Basque speaking people in Navarre 2001 and the zones where the Basque language is official

Navarre opted in 1982 not to adopt the official status of Autonomous Community. Instead, as the result of a legal process known as Amejoramiento ("improvement") it is considered a Foral ("chartered") Community (i.e. Community possessing fueros). This is seen as a continuation of Navarre's "historical rights", which are now guaranteed by the Spanish Constitution. The Basque Statute of Autonomy provides for Navarre to join the Autonomous Community of the Basque Country at any time if approved by the Navarrese Parliament and people. This option also has not been taken up by Navarre.

Basque and Spanish identities are "today superimposed on each other" in Navarre. The Basque language is widely spoken in the northern parts of Navarre, and is used by about 12% of the people of the province as a whole. Basque has declined in the central areas, and is not known to have ever been spoken in the southern half of Navarre, which is almost exclusively inhabited by speakers of Castilian. According to the Ley Foral del Vascuence ("Foral Law regarding Basque Language"), the province is divided into three linguistic areas: Basque speaking area (Zona Vascófona), where Basque is recognised as co-official language; Spanish speaking area with some facilities to the Basque speakers (Zona Mixta), and Spanish monolingual speaking area (Zona No Vascófona). Politically, the Basque nationalist parties call for Navarre to join the Basque Autonomous Community. In the 2015 regional elections Basque nationalist groupings Geroa Bai and EH Bildu together won 30% of the votes, exceeding by a small margin the vote for the conservative regionalist party Navarrese People's Union (UPN) which had held power for four terms. Following this election, Uxue Barkos of Geroa Bai was appointed president of Navarre.

=== Cantabria ===
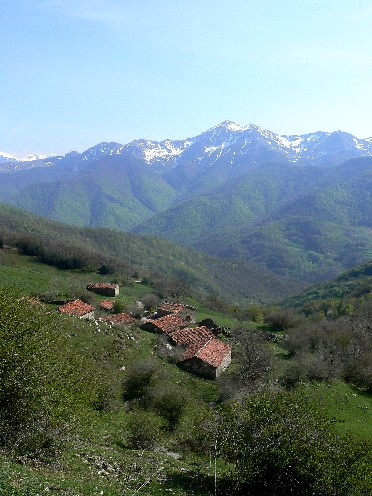
The Cordillera Cantabrica divides Cantabria from Castile.

The Autonomous Community of Cantabria comprises the single province of Cantabria (formerly Province of Santander). It was part of the Kingdom of Castile from the early days of that kingdom, being known outside the territory as La Montaña ("The Mountain"), and providing Castile's only outlet to the northern coast. Geographically, however, Cantabria was isolated from Castile and contrasted with it in many ways; the primary division between Cantabria and the rest of Castile was more geographic,ideological and cultural than political.

Cantabria was first constituted as a province only in 1778, when the ancient name of Cantabria was chosen for it, later replaced by "Santander" after the main city. The province was included within the region of Old Castile when Spain's "historic regions" were defined in 1833. A proposal for a Statute of Autonomy for a Cantabrian Federal State (including some places of Castilla) came forward during the Second Republic. During the formation of Autonomous Communities, Cantabria based its claim to autonomy on the constitutional precept that made provision for self-government for "provinces with a historic regional character". In its current Statute of Autonomy, passed in 1981, Cantabria is termed as comunidad histórica ("historic community").

The development of a regional identity for Cantabria is said to have been impelled by the creation of autonomous institutions, building on geography, a specific Cantabrian dialect, and distinct traditions, local legends and symbols. Social survey analysis has indicated a low level of regional identification in Cantabria. The Regionalist Party of Cantabria (PRC), active since the 1970s, has increased its support over time and won 30% of the vote in the 2015 regional election. It was in the regional government between 2003 and 2011 in coalition with the Socialist Workers' Party, and took over the presidency in 2015. The nationalism in Cantabria was represented by the Cantabrian Nationalist Council , which has not achieved substantial electoral support, and, since 2018, represented by Cantabristas. There are some nathionalist organizations in Cantabria like Cantabria No Se Vende.

=== Asturias ===
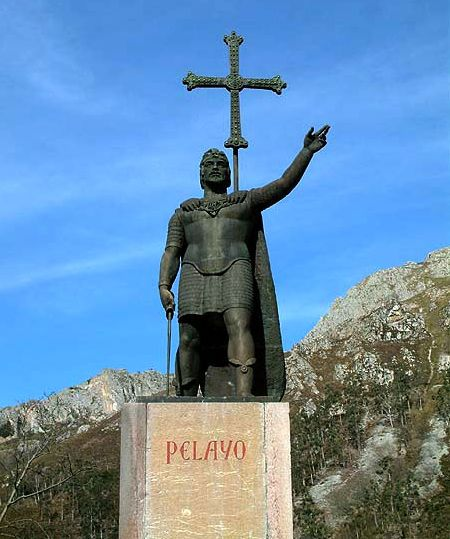
Pelagius, first king of Asturias

Asturias is a coastal and mountainous area, which had a major coal industry during the 19th and 20th centuries. The Kingdom of Asturias was the first Christian kingdom established after the Muslim invasion. It rose to prominence across the north and northwest before being overshadowed by the kingdoms of León, Navarre and Castile. Asturias had (and still has) its own language, Asturian, with similarities to Leonese. Asturias has never had strong regionalist tendencies compared with other regions; however, there was a brief consideration of separatism during the mid-17th century. Even during that time and until recently, any form of regional independence was more prompted by economic factors than any form of ideological regionalism. In a 2002 survey, 87% of Asturians showed a strong regional identification, but not to the exclusion of a Spanish identity.

The most important regionalist party is Asturias Forum (Foro Asturias, FAC), which split from the People's Party in 2011. It was the largest party in the regional government from 2011 to 2012, and attracted 25% of votes in the 2012 regional election, but their poll was down to 8% in 2015. Its platform focuses on administrative improvements and economic growth, rather than any increase in autonomy. Nationalist parties, campaigning for independence, include Unidá and Andecha Astur. These attract only small electoral support.

=== Galicia ===
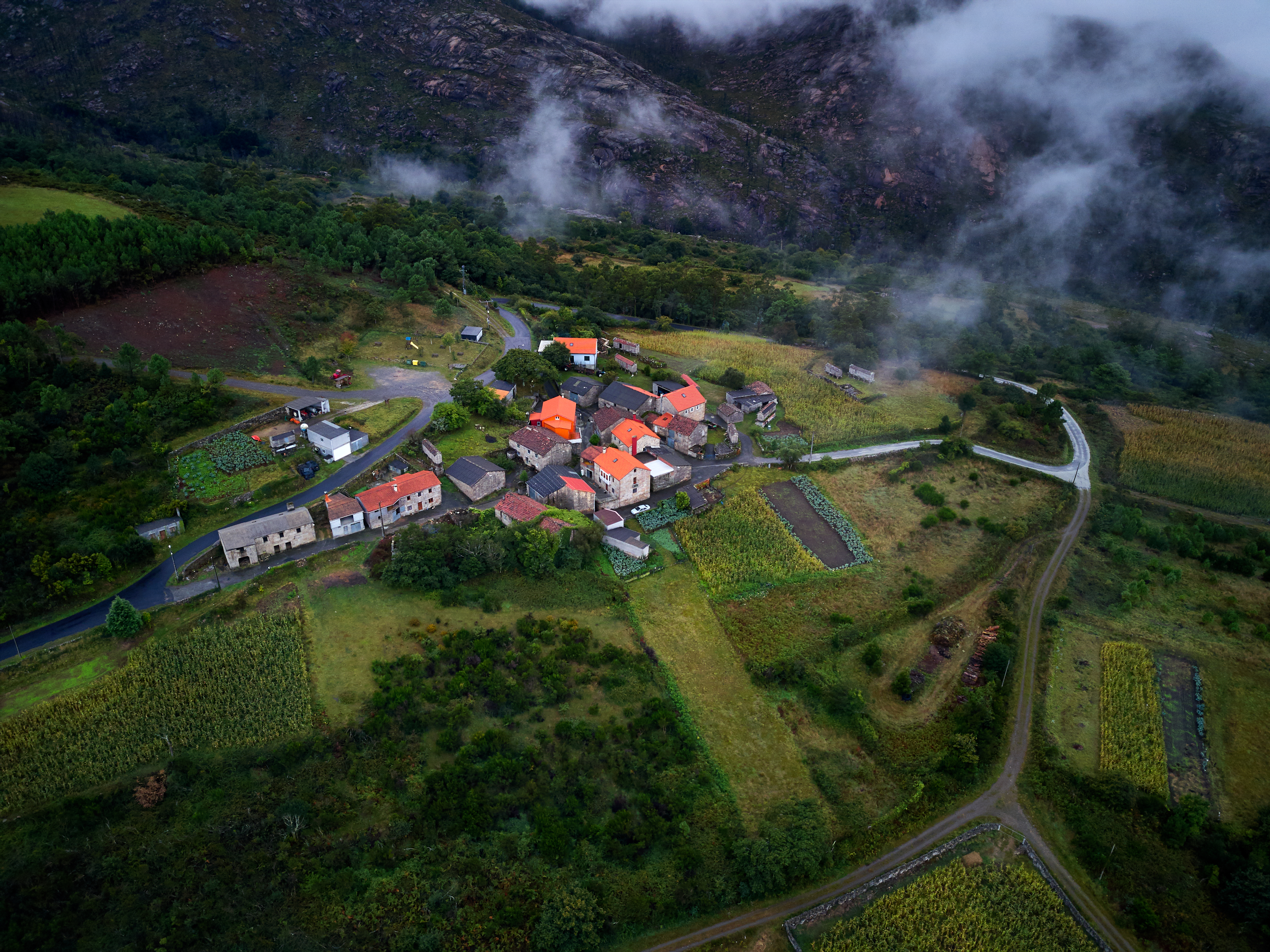
Aerial view of a village near Fisterra

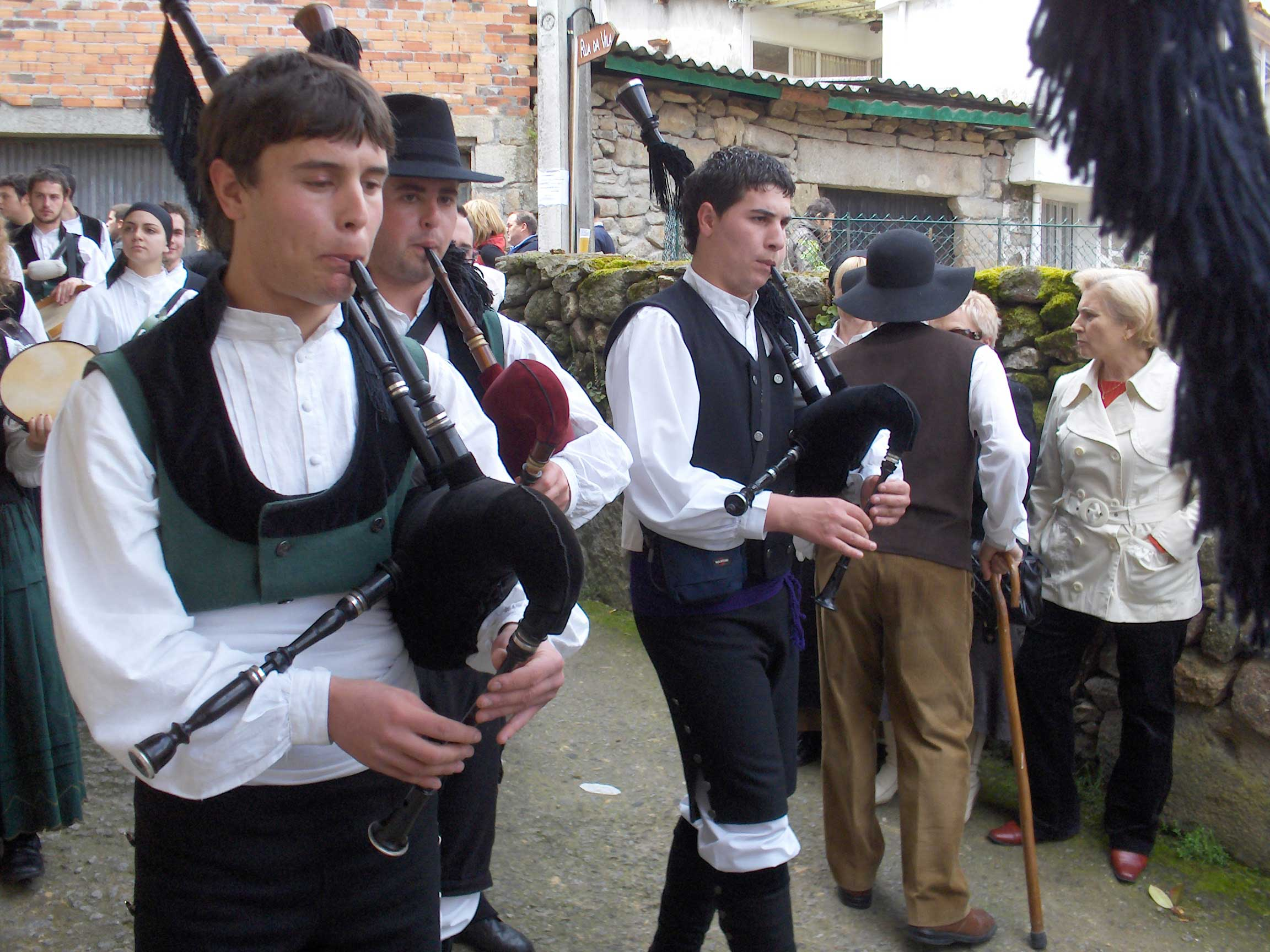
Galician gaiteiros

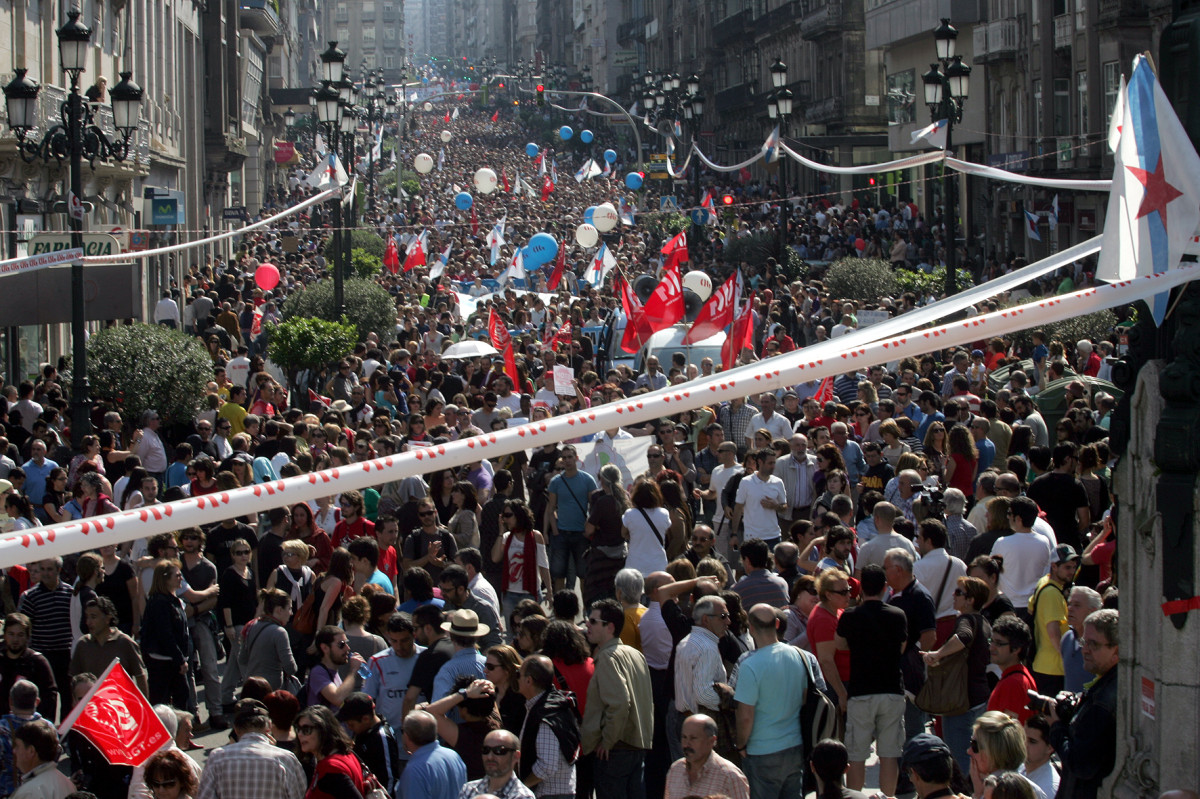
Nationalist demonstration in Vigo

Galicia is an area of abundant rainfall but poor soil, sometimes compared with Ireland, with elements of a Celtic heritage and its own language. Its "remoteness from the rest of Spain ... has been its chief characteristic". Galician rural society came to be characterised by poverty and an "extreme subdivision" of land holdings, with large-scale emigration to other parts of Spain and to America. As early as the 11th century Galicia united with León, which itself was incorporated in the Kingdom of Castile in 1230. Social conflict came to a head in the revolt of the Irmandiños in the late 15th century, following which the Catholic Monarchs reduced the powers of the Galician nobility. Until 1833 Galicia retained the status of a kingdom within Castile, with its own assembly. An "antiquated system" of land tenure, based on long-term leases or foros, persisted down to the 1920s and caused many legal disputes and social conflicts.

Estreleira: symbol of left-wing Galician nationalism

The Galician language is more similar to Portuguese than to Castilian. In the early medieval period, Galician was a language of poetry with a strong literary tradition, but it dropped out of literary use after the 15th century. A linguistic revival began in the 19th century with poets such as Rosalía de Castro, within a cultural revival known as the Rexurdimento, and later with Galicianist societies known as Irmandades da Fala. The drive to political autonomy at that time was further impelled by concerns over agricultural policy, but aroused "but lukewarm interest". The nationalist political programme drawn up in 1918 by the Irmandades was taken up by autonomist political parties, the Autonomous Galician Republican Organization (founded 1929) and Partido Galeguista (1931). These parties prepared and promoted a Statute of Autonomy. The parties soon became part of the Republican Left.

The present Statute of Autonomy defines Galicia as a "nationality". The Galician Government of 2005–2009 tried to draft a new Statute of Autonomy where Galicia would most probably have been defined as a "nation" (with declaratory, but not legal value). This was put on hold after the 2009 elections, won by the conservative People's Party. Most Galicians in 2002 identified with their region either equally strongly or more strongly than they identified with Spain, but in a 2010 survey only 1.7% supported Galician independence.

Unlike in other Spanish Autonomous Communities, the Galician arms of the main Spanish parties – the conservative Galician People's Party and the Socialists' Party of Galicia (PSdeG-PSOE) – include Galicianism among their principles. Galician-nationalist parties have a smaller representation than their counterparts in Catalonia or the Basque Country. The longest-standing nationalist group in the Parliament of Galicia is the Galician Nationalist Bloc (BNG), founded in 1982. This is a coalition of parties, some of which endorse independence, like the UPG and the Galician Movement for Socialism. It has only once had a share of power in the Galician parliament, from 2005 to 2009, when it was part of a coalition government with the Socialists' Party of Galicia. BNG campaigns for national sovereignty, independence and strong promotion of Galician culture and language. In the 2012 election the newly formed Galician Left Alternative (AGE), which had split from BNG and included independentist groups, overtook the BNG in Parliament, winning 9 seats. A successor group to the AGE known as En Marea stood in the 2016 election with the support of the Spanish Podemos and United Left parties, and attracted 19% of the vote against 8% for the BNG; the People's Party of Galicia won the majority.

Galician nationalism is present in the majority of Galician social movements, especially in the Galician language defense movement (A Mesa pola Normalización Lingüística ("The Panel for Language Normalization"), Queremos Galego ("We Want Galician"), AGAL, and other groups) and in the ecologist movement (ADEGA, Verdegaia, Nunca Máis ("Never Again"), and other groups). Nationalism is also present in organized labour and trade unions: the most important union of Galicia is the left-wing nationalist Confederación Intersindical Galega ("Galician Interunion Confederation"), with more than 80,000 members and 5,623 delegates.

== Central Spain ==
=== Castile ===
Old Castile and New Castile as delineated in 1833

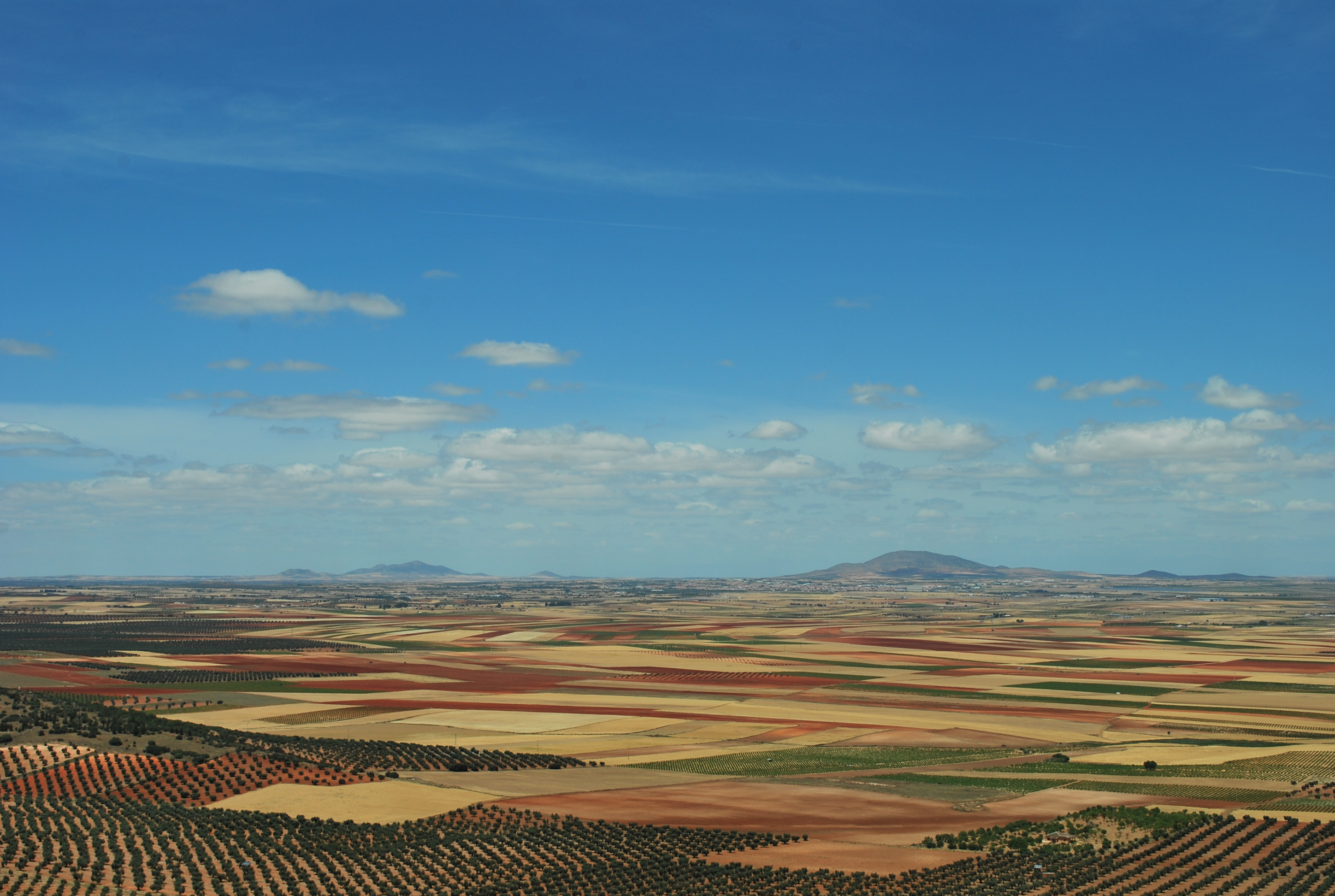
Summer in Los Yébenes, Toledo province

The 1833 division of Spain defined Old Castile and New Castile as historical regions. Old Castile excluded the historical region of Leon, but included Cantabria and La Rioja provinces. New Castile excluded Albacete. In these ways what was then termed Castile varies from the present Autonomous Communities of Castile and Leon, Community of Madrid, and Castile-La Mancha.

Castile, with the capital Madrid at its heart, roughly coincides with the central tableland of Spain (meseta). It is in the main a region of poor soils and unreliable rainfall. Historically agriculture has not brought prosperity and for long was subordinated to the powerful guild of sheep owners, while industrial development has been hampered by distance and difficult terrain raising transport costs.

The Kingdom of Castile even from the 11th century "claimed a kind of sovereignty over all the princes, Christian or Moslem, of the Peninsula". The medieval Crown of Castile grew to encompass almost all of Spain outside the Crown of Aragon; even after the establishment of a joint monarchy in 1469 Castile remained distinct from Aragon up to the 18th century. Spanish was the language of the royal court and bureaucracy. The Spanish American colonies were only officially open to Castilians, and most of the American trade was channeled through Seville and later Cádiz in Andalusia, also part of the Kingdom of Castile. Until the Bourbons, Castilians bore the brunt of the taxes to support Spain's military and central administration and military forces. Government from Madrid was gradually extended to the whole of Spain.

Under the current system of Autonomous Communities, León is incorporated into Castile and León and Albacete into Castile-La Mancha. Cantabria, La Rioja, and the Community of Madrid have each become separate Autonomous Communities.

Castilians, as the "dominant group" in Spain, "do not distinguish between their national Castilian identity and their allegedly supranational Spanish identity ... they prefer to think of themselves as Spanish rather than as Castilian". Social survey analysis has indicated a low level of regional identification in all three of the Autonomous Communities making up Castile. The Castilian nationalist movement seeks to unify historical Castile, taking in Cantabria and La Rioja. Its political expression Commoners' Land merged into the Castilian Party in 2009, but neither this nor the La Mancha-based Castilian Unity have attracted significant support in regional elections. In La Mancha, a Mancheguian regionalism has existed since the 19th century.

=== León ===
The Kingdom of León (yellow) in 1037

The historical Kingdom of León once extended over the whole northwest region of the Iberian Peninsula. This kingdom participated in the Reconquista (primarily in Extremadura) in rivalry with Castile. Despite being the larger and more powerful of the two kingdoms, León was forcibly incorporated into Castile in the 13th century. Under Castilian rule, León retained the title of Kingdom and many of its own institutions down to the 19th century.

León has a language (or dialect) of its own, derived from Astur-Leonese which was the language of much of the Leonese kingdom while independent of Castile. The region of León or "Leonese Country", consisting of the provinces of León, Zamora and Salamanca, was identified as a "historical region" in 1833 and is now incorporated into the larger Autonomous Community of Castile and León. There is some support for reinstating the region in the form of a separate Autonomous Community (a movement known as Leonesism), and raising the status of the Leonese language. This finds political expression in the Leonese People's Union (UPL). The UPL finds most support in León province, where its share of the vote in regional elections reached 18% in 1999 and 2003 (7% in 2015). Other regionalist parties are Leonese Autonomist Party–Leonesist Unity (PAL-UL) and Regionalist Party of the Leonese Country (PREPAL). More militant nationalists call for reunification of all the historically Leonese territories including some in Portugal.

=== La Rioja ===
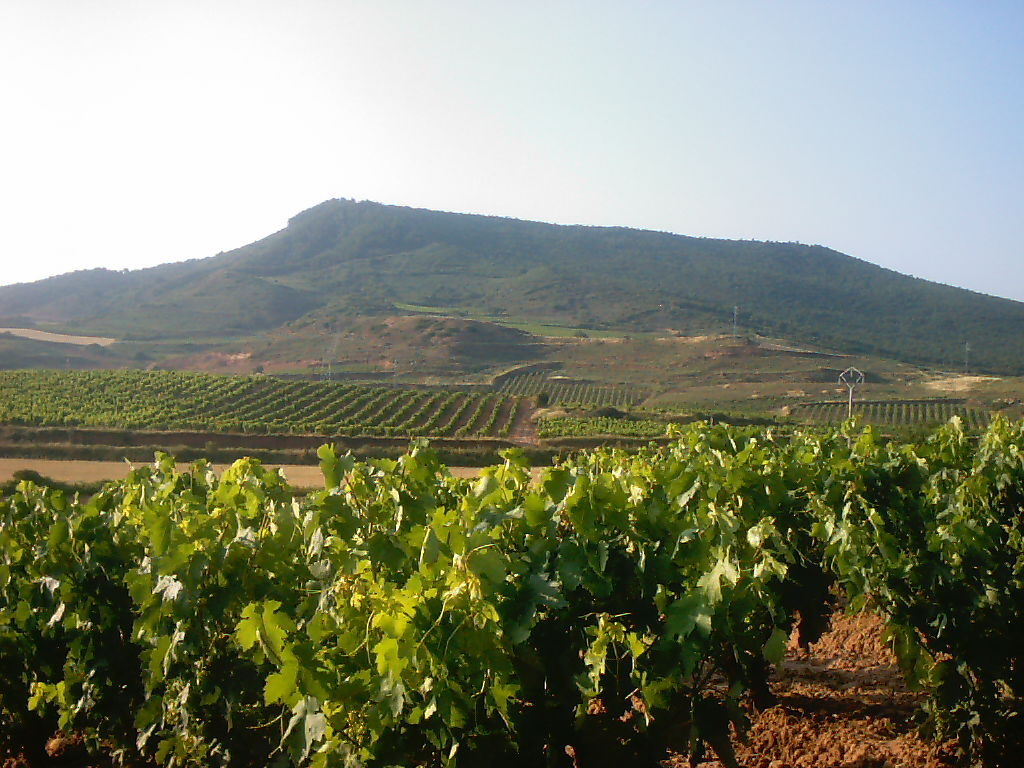
Vineyard in Ventosa, La Rioja

La Rioja is situated on the border of Castile, Aragon and the Basque Country, along the River Ebro, contrasting with its neighbours in its intensive agriculture. It is predominantly Castilian, but has a Basque minority. On the establishment of Autonomous Communities the Basques wanted to join the Basque Country and some Castilians wanted to join Castile. They were unable to agree, and even Castilians were hesitant to join Old Castile for economic (agricultural) reasons. Therefore, although there had previously been little regionalist sentiment, the inhabitants voted to establish a separate Autonomous Community.

The regionalist Riojan Party has attracted around 6% of the vote in regional elections ever since its foundation in 1982. In a 2002 survey 19% of respondents said they identified more with La Rioja than with Spain. Most respondents in a 2015 survey in the province were not supportive of further increases in regional autonomy in Spain in general.

=== Extremadura ===
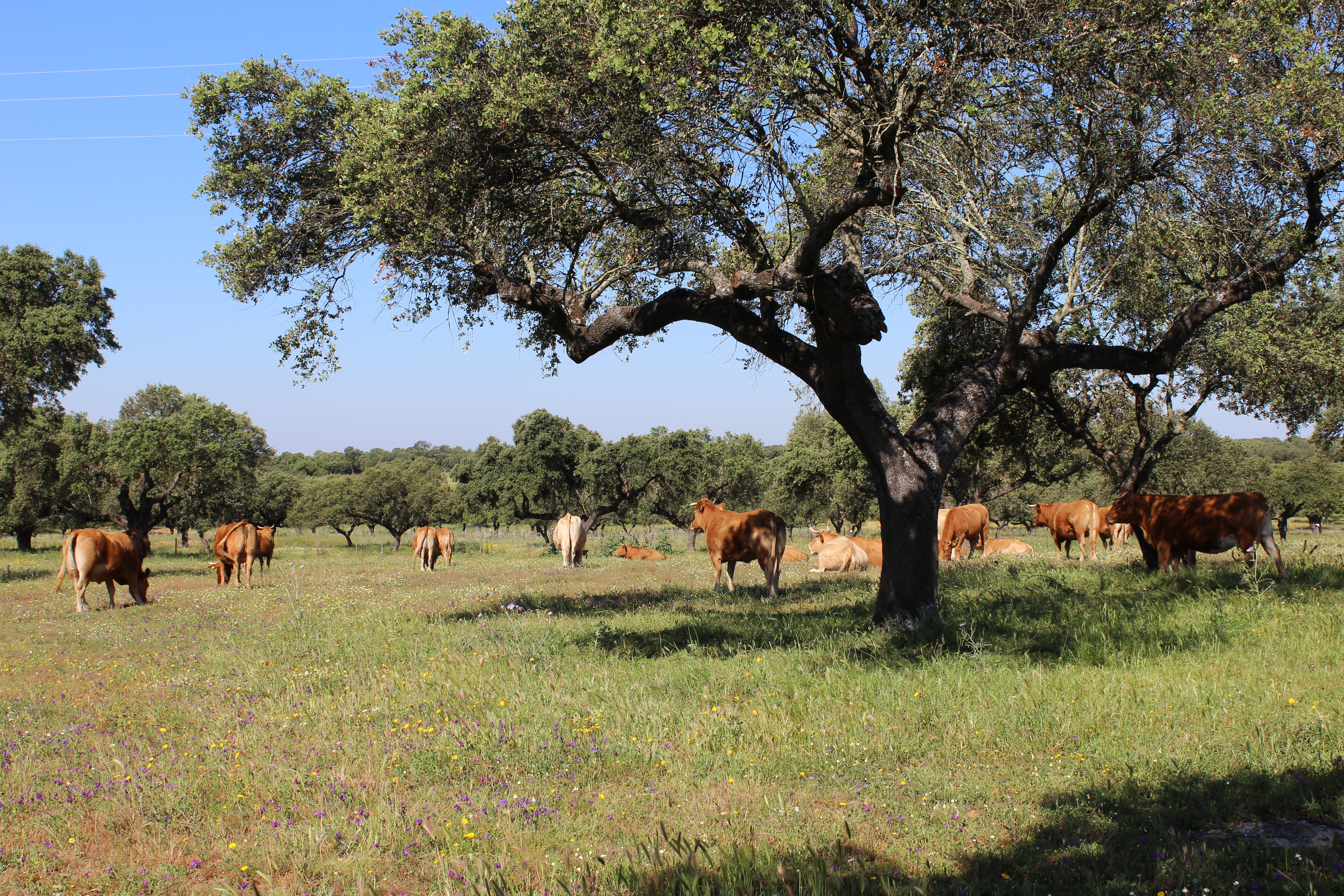
Dehesa country in Badajoz province

This predominantly rural and partly mountainous western region was conquered in the late 12th and early 13th centuries by the Kingdoms of León and Castile. The resulting territories were termed Extremadura leonesa and Extremaduras de Castilla (the latter including lands well to the north of the present-day region). On the union of the two kingdoms, the Provincia de Extremadura gained recognition as an administrative area. That province was reconstituted in 1653 when the main cities, headed by Trujillo, together obtained representation in the Cortes de Castilla. In the 1833 demarcation, Extremadura was recognised as a "historic region", from then on composed of the two provinces of Cáceres and Badajoz.

In the late 1970s, a proposed incorporation of Extremadura into the Andalusian Autonomous Community was rejected by Andalusia on the grounds that Extremadura was too poor, and Extremadura itself felt that its other option, New Castile, was also too poor. In the end Extremadura became a separate Autonomous Community.

Extremadura is a sparsely populated region, one of the poorest in Spain, historically dependent on agriculture and livestock farming. It has experienced much emigration: many of the conquistadores of the Americas came from there. At the present day service industries dominate in the economy, with a growing rural tourism sector and very few larger businesses.

The Extremaduran language is spoken in northern rural areas, and shades into dialects of Spanish that are in wider use. There are a few border areas where varieties close to Portuguese are spoken, for example near Olivenza (Olivença). Sovereignty over Olivenza and other, smaller, border areas has been disputed between Spain and Portugal since the early 19th century.

The great majority of Extremadurans identify at least as strongly with their region as they do with Spain, but without "rejecting Spanishness". Regionalist political parties include the Extremaduran Coalition (eXtremeños) and United Extremadura (EU). The electoral support they attract is small.

== Southern Spain ==
=== Andalusia ===
Arbonaida: symbol of left-wing Andalusian nationalism

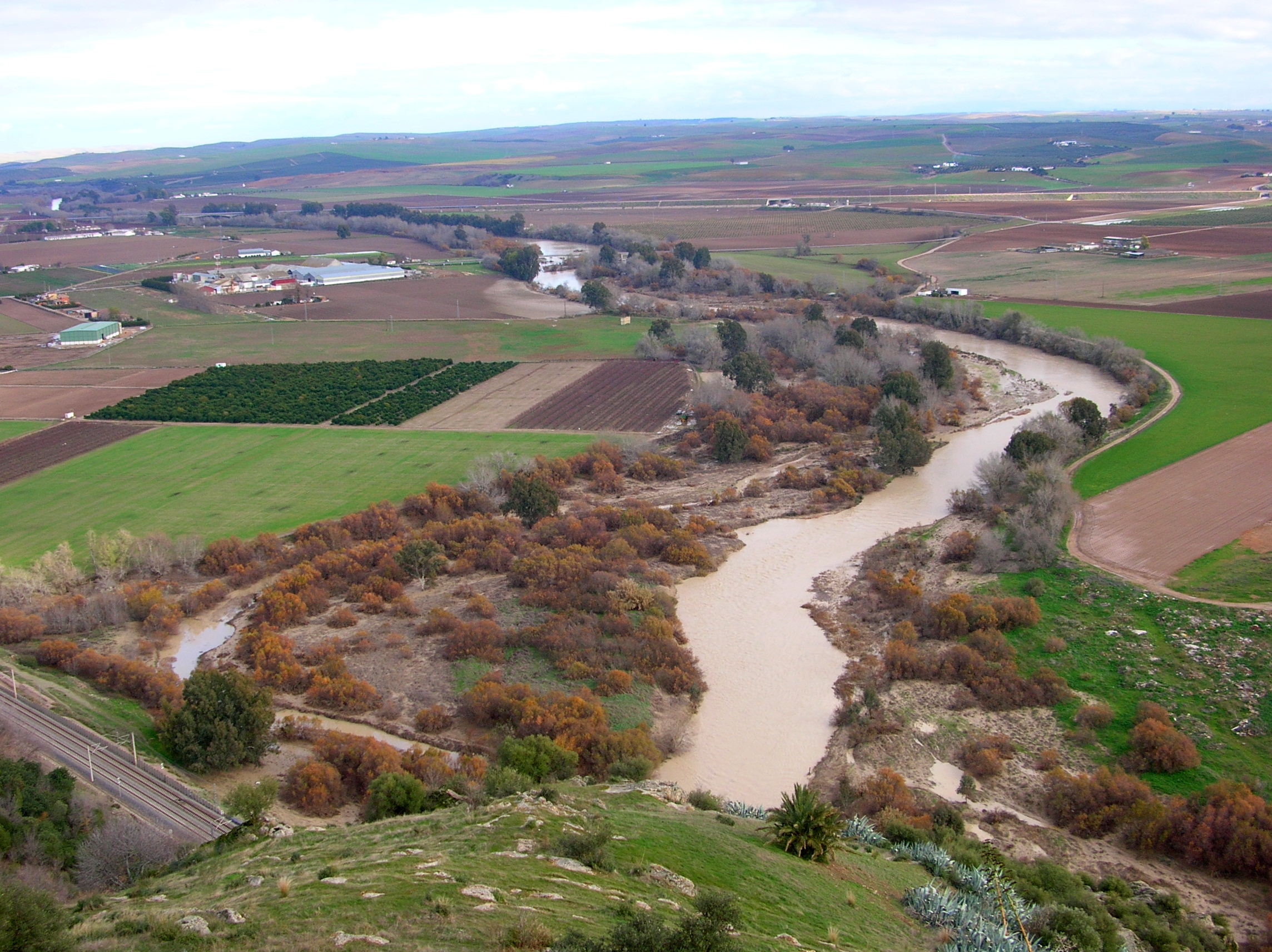
The Guadalquivir flows through the central plain of Andalusia.

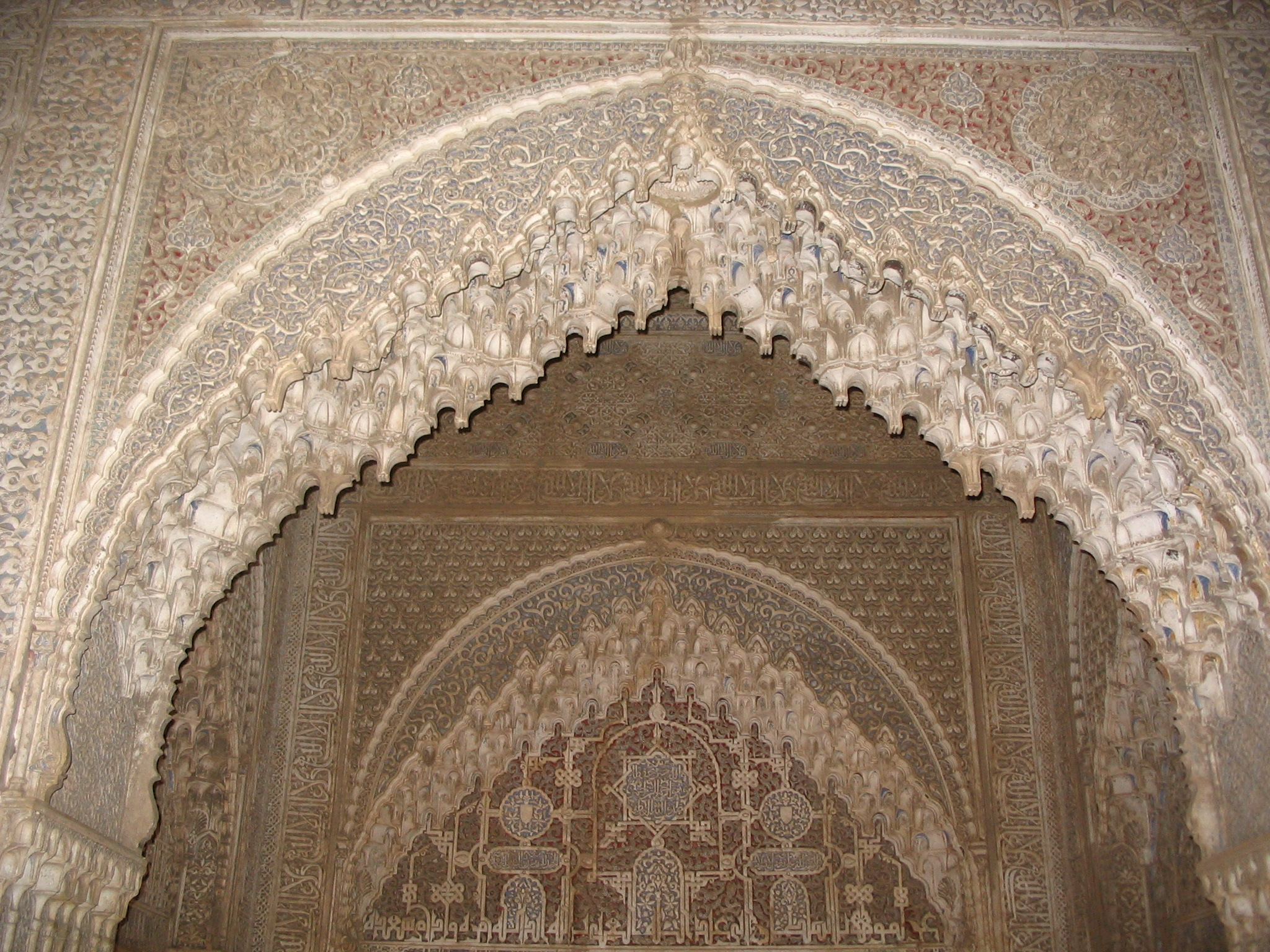
Arab architecture in the Alhambra palace, Granada

The southern region of Andalusia, the most populous and second largest Autonomous Community in Spain, comprises eight provinces (Seville, Cádiz, Cordoba, Málaga, Granada, Almería, Jaén, and Huelva). Its northern boundary with other Spanish regions is defined by the Sierra Morena, and it has extensive coastlines on both the Atlantic and the Mediterranean. The geographic subregion of Upper Andalusia (or Eastern Andalusia) lies mostly within the Baetic System, while Lower Andalusia (or Western Andalusia) is centred on the Baetic Depression of the valley of the Guadalquivir.

Andalusia saw many waves of invaders and settlers: the ancient Iberians were followed by Celts, Phoenicians and other Eastern Mediterranean traders, Romans, migrating Germanic tribes, North African Muslims, and the Castilians and other Spanish of the Reconquista. Granada was the last Muslim kingdom in Spain, surviving until 1492, before the whole of the region was absorbed into the Kingdom of Castile. The Moriscos – Christianised descendants of Muslims – were expelled from Spain after two rebellions in the Alpujarras. Seville and later Cádiz grew in wealth and importance as the main outlets for trade with Spanish America. There was a conspiracy for revolt in Andalusia in the mid-17th century.

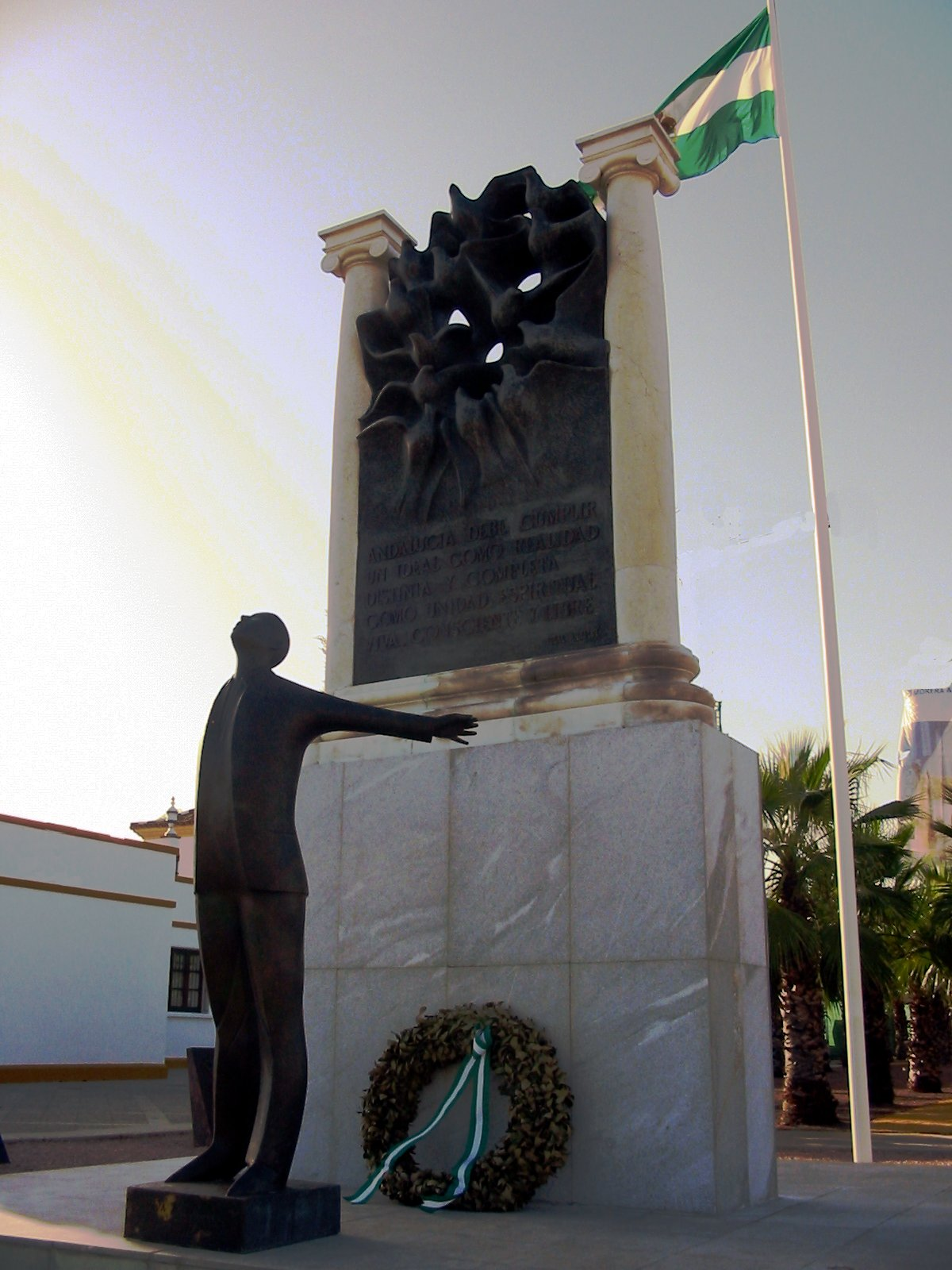
Monument to Blas Infante in Seville

Andalusian nationalism arose in the later 19th century, with leaders such as Blas Infante (1885–1936) campaigning for an autonomous Andalusia within a federal state. In 1980, following the collapse of the Franco regime, the region petitioned in a referendum to be granted a "fast track" to a fuller degree of autonomy on the same basis as the "historical nations" of Catalonia and the Basque Country. Although Andalusia had always been part of Castile after the Reconquista, it was nevertheless granted autonomy, following which a similar status of autonomy was extended to all parts of the country that wanted it (Navarre declined). The Statute of Autonomy introduced at that time defines this region as a nationality. In a later Statute of Autonomy, approved in 2007, Andalusia is defined as a national entity and as a "historic nationality". According to a poll 18.1% supported declaring Andalusia a nation in the new statute, while 60.7% of Andalusians did not agree with it. A survey in 2002 found that the overwhelming majority of Andalusians, in common with most other Spaniards outside Castile, identified at least as strongly with their Autonomous Community as they did with Spain as a whole.

The economy of Andalusia has traditionally been based on agriculture, which is still an important sector. Since the Romans, land ownership has been concentrated to a greater degree than elsewhere in Spain into large estates, called latifundia, worked by numerous landless labourers. Many of these rural labourers were drawn to the anarchist movement in the later 19th and earlier 20th centuries. Industry has been slow to develop and forms a smaller part of the economy than in other parts of Spain; much of it consists of smaller-scale plants processing primary products. Tourism has become an important economic sector, concentrated on the Costa del Sol.

The Andalusians speak distinct dialects of Castilian that collectively are known as Andalusian Spanish. These dialects share some common features; among these is the retention of more Arabic words than elsewhere in Spain, as well as some phonological differences compared with Standard Spanish, but there is no clear border for the linguistic region. Andalusian Spanish is one of the most widely spoken forms of Spanish in Spain, and because of emigration patterns was very influential on American Spanish.

Andalusia may itself be considered a collection of distinct regions. Nevertheless, Andalusia has maintained a relatively shared identity, based upon similar economies, foods, customs, and lesser formality than the rest of the historical region of Castile. Despite the expulsion edicts, several aspects of Arab culture remained for a good part of the early modern period: in art, architecture (e.g. having interior-facing homes), social practices, and types of dress and dances. Andalusian cultural identity was already delineated in the 19th century and diffused widely in the literary and pictorial genre of Andalusian costumbrismo. Andalusian culture came to be widely viewed as the Spanish culture par excellence, in part thanks to the perceptions of romantic travellers. In the words of Ortega y Gasset:

Andalusia, which has never shown the swagger nor petulancy of particularism; that has never pretended to the status of a State apart, is, of all the Spanish regions, the one that possesses a culture most radically its own.

— Ortega y Gasset, Teoría de Andalucía, 1927

Politically, the Alianza Socialista de Andalucía (ASA) was founded in 1971 and campaigned for Andalusian autonomy through the Transition period, based on economic rather than historical or cultural factors. The Andalusian Party (PA) continued to campaign for self-determination and the recognition of Andalusians as a nation within a Europe of the Peoples. This party won 1.5% of the vote and no seats in the regional elections in 2015. It was dissolved the same year. In the trade union movement, the nationalist Andalusian Workers' Union (SAT) has 25,000 members and a strong presence in the rural areas.

==== Eastern Andalusia ====
The location of Eastern Andalusia in Spain

There is a regionalist movement in the eastern part of Andalusia – mainly Granada, Almería and Jaén provinces, but with some support also in Málaga province – which seeks to create an Autonomous Community separated from Western Andalusia. Historically, Granada was the last Arab kingdom in the Iberian Peninsula, and had its own administrative region until 1833 when the Andalusian provinces were combined into a single "historical region". The Platform for Eastern Andalusia has contributed to expand the movement. Among the motivations for the movement, the most important are economic, seeking to benefit from Spanish decentralization as opposed to Sevilian centralism, but also historical. The movement is not associated with a particular political platform. A political party, Partido Regionalista por Andalucía Oriental, aims at a new Autonomous Community for the region, without rejecting the wider unity of Spain.

==== Gitanos ====
The formerly nomadic Gitanos are distinctly marked by high (yet falling) levels of endogamy and persisting social stigma and discrimination. Although they are dispersed throughout the country, nearly half of them live in Andalusia where they enjoy much higher levels of integration and social acceptance and are a core element of Andalusian identity.

=== Canary Islands ===
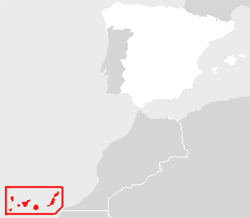
Location of Canary Islands

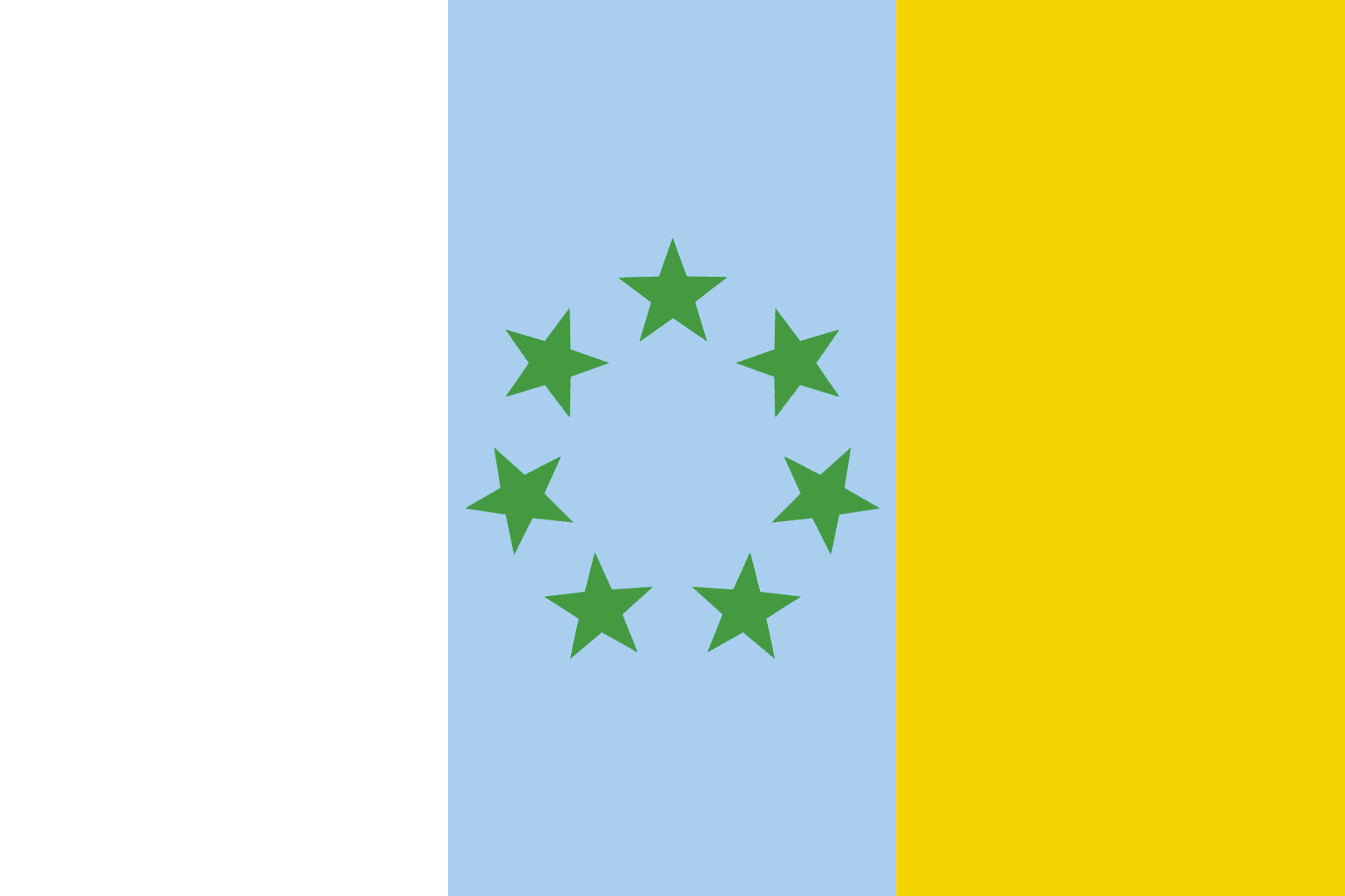
Canarian nationalist banner

The Canary Islands form an archipelago in the Atlantic, at closest 100 kilometres (62 mi) off the coast of southern Morocco, and 1,800 kilometres (1,100 mi) flight distance from Madrid. Eight of the islands are inhabited, with over 80% of the population living on the two islands of Tenerife and Gran Canaria, each part of a different province. A distinct dialect, Canarian Spanish, is spoken.

The islands were first inhabited by a people known as the Guanches, speaking a language akin to Berber. The Kingdom of Castile conquered and incorporated the islands during the 15th century, although there were indigenous uprisings in later centuries. The Canaries acquired various special competences and privileges (fueros), including a tier of local government called cabildos insulares (island councils), which still exists and is now unique in Spain. Canarian nationalism arose in the later 19th century, led by Nicolás Estévanez, Secundino Delgado and others. In 1964, Antonio Cubillo founded the MPAIAC (Movement for the Self-determination and Independence of the Canarian Archipelago). Some separatist groups committed acts of terrorism during the later Franco period and subsequent years.

The leading sector of the economy is tourism, with almost 15 million visitors in 2016. A wide variety of agricultural products is exported, including an important banana crop. The islands are within the European Union and the EU customs union but outside the EU VAT area. Instead of VAT there is a local Sales Tax (IGIC) charged at varying rates for different products. Some exports from the Canaries into mainland Spain or the rest of the EU are subject to import tax and VAT.

Social survey analysis has indicated a high level of regional identification in the Canary Islands. The Canarian Coalition (CC), formed in 1993 by the union of several Canarian nationalist parties is a major political force in the Canaries, in the 2015 elections winning 18 of the 60 seats in the Canarian Parliament, and 300 of 1,382 seats in municipal councils with 16% of the vote. The CC pursues autonomy but not independence. There has been little support within the islands for pro-independence movements such as MPAIAC (dissolved in 1982), Popular Front of the Canary Islands and National Congress of the Canaries. The majority of people on the islands (88.4%) consider themselves both Spanish and Canarian, whilst only 6.1% consider themselves only Canarian.

=== Murcia ===
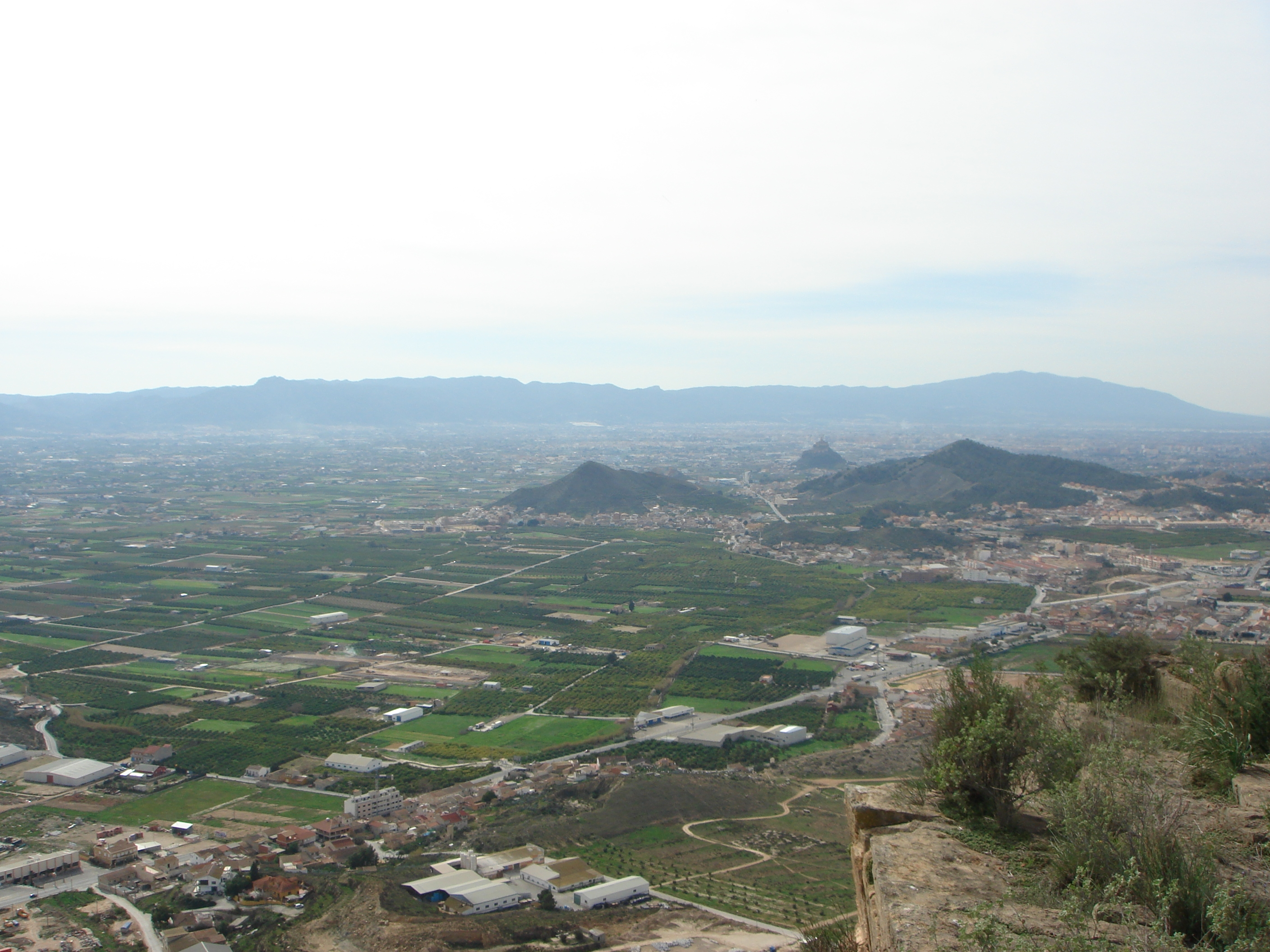
The irrigated plain of Murcia, a productive fruit and vegetable growing area

This Mediterranean region was once the centre of an Islamic kingdom, the Taifa of Murcia. It became subject to the Kingdom of Castile in the 13th century. The territorial division of 1833 recognised a Murcian "historic region" consisting of two provinces, Murcia and Albacete, but no administrative powers were assigned to these regions. An independent Cantón Murciano was declared during the short-lived First Spanish Republic in 1873. On the inauguration of the Second Republic in 1931, a call was again made for a greater Murcian region within the more devolved state structure then envisaged. Under the 1978 Constitution, Murcia opted to become a separate Autonomous Community consisting of a single province, more for financial reasons than regional identity.

The region is agriculturally productive where sufficient water can be provided, and has an important tourist trade concentrated on the coastline. A dialect, Murcian Spanish, is spoken and written, which some argue should be recognised as a distinct language, murciano.

Social survey analysis has indicated a low level of regional identification in Murcia. Politically, several Murcian nationalist and regionalist parties were launched during the 1980s and 1990s; however, Murcia currently has no nationalist or regionalist party with significant impact.

=== Ceuta and Melilla ===
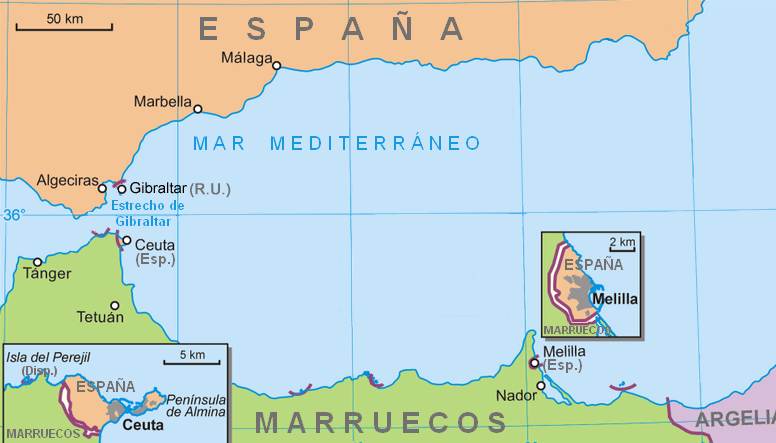
Location of Ceuta and Melilla

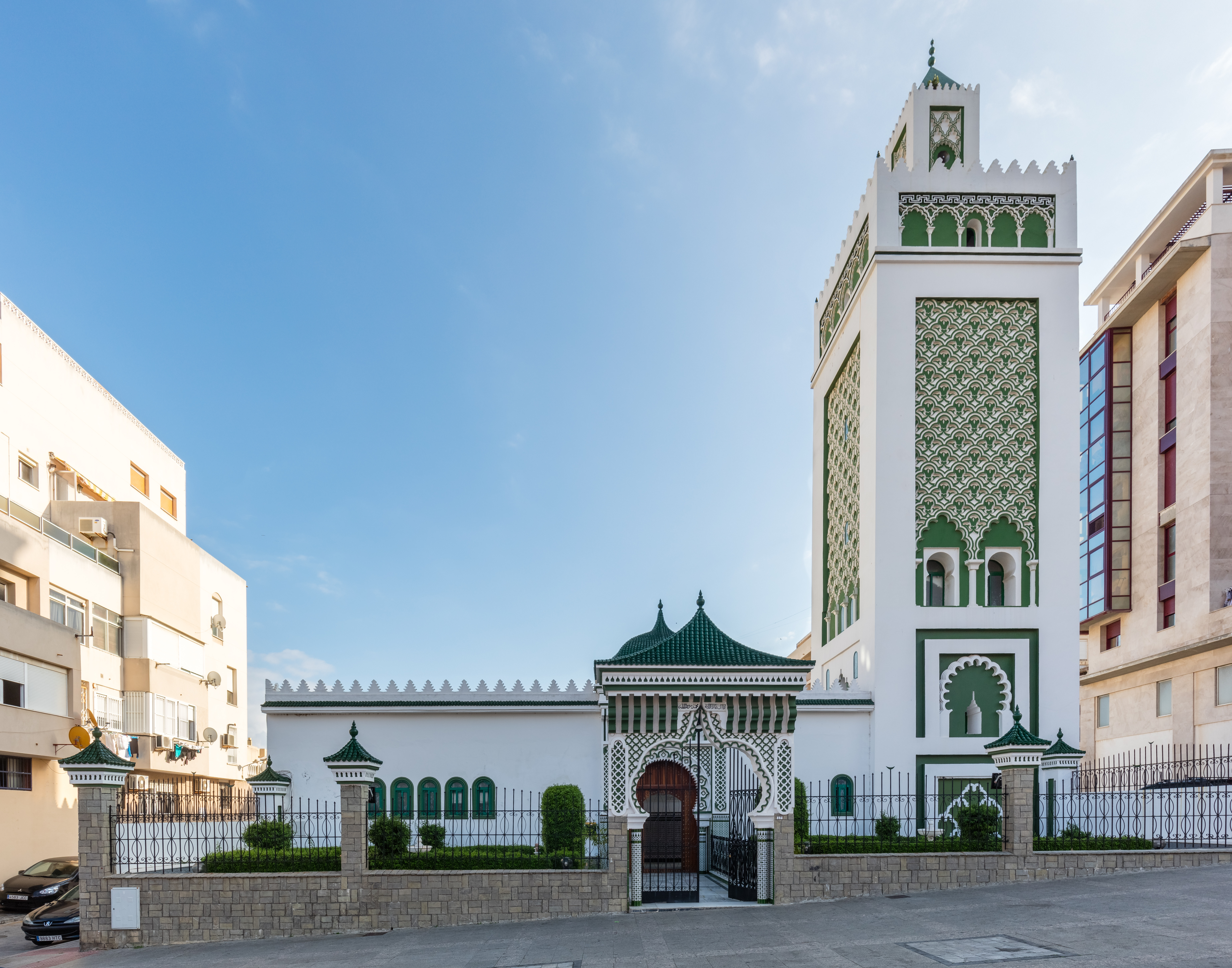
Mosque of Muley El Mehdi, Ceuta

Ceuta and Melilla are port cities, Spanish enclaves on the coast of North Africa. Their incorporation within Spain is disputed by Morocco. Their population contains a large element of Moroccan and Muslim origin, who speak North African languages.

Ceuta was under Portuguese rule from the 15th century, and was transferred to Spain in the 17th century. Melilla was occupied by Spain in 1497, and was repeatedly besieged by Moroccan forces thereafter. Ceuta was attached to the Province of Cádiz and Melilla to the Province of Málaga until 1995, when their Statutes of Autonomy came into force. Retained by Spain when the rest of Spanish Morocco received independence in 1956, the territories are claimed by Morocco. Many residents of Moroccan origin, however, are reported to prefer that the territories remain within Spain.

The official language is Spanish, but the two cities have been described as “laboratories of multilingualism”. Around 40% of the population is of Moroccan (Arab and Berber) origin and speaks Darija Arabic in Ceuta, and Riffian Berber in Melilla.

Ceuta and Melilla are historically military strongholds and fishing ports with the status of free ports. They are outside the European VAT and customs union systems, and have a special low-tax regime. The economy of Ceuta is still centred on its port and on developing industrial and retail sectors. Melilla's economy is dominated by fishing and by cross-border trade with Morocco.

The cities have the status of autonomous cities and are each governed by a Mayor-President and an elected assembly (Council of Government). Both have left-wing regionalist parties: in the 2015 elections to the respective 25-seat Councils, the Caballas Coalition in Ceuta won 4 seats with 13% of the vote, and the Coalition for Melilla won 7 seats with 26% of the vote. These two parties collaborate in a "regionalist front" in the national parliament to press the claims of the two cities.

Since 2010, Ceuta and Melilla have declared the Muslim holiday of Eid al-Adha or Feast of the Sacrifice, as an official public holiday. It is the first time a non-Christian religious festival has been officially celebrated in Spain since the Reconquista.

== Maps ==
Andalusia

Aragon

Asturias

Balearic Islands

Basque Country

Canary Islands

Cantabria

Castile La Mancha

Castile and León

Catalonia

Ceuta

Community of Madrid

Extremadura

Galicia

La Rioja

Melilla

Navarra

Region of Murcia

Valencian Community

== See also ==
- Spanish dialects and varieties
- Autonomist and secessionist movements in Spain
- Coconstitutionalism
- Ethnic groups of Spain
- Catalan independence movement
- Galician independence
- Spanish football rivalries
- Spanish American wars of independence
- Separatism in the United Kingdom

== Sources ==
- Brenan, Gerald (1942). The Spanish Labyrinth (Paperback edition 1960 ed.). Cambridge University Press.
- Carr, Raymond (1966). Spain: 1808–1939. Clarendon Press.
- Elliott, J.H. (2002). Imperial Spain 1469-1716 (Repr. ed.). London [u.a.]: Penguin Books. ISBN 0-14-100703-6.
- Fletcher, Richard (2006). Arab Spain (2. paperback print. ed.). Berkeley, Calif. [u.a.]: Univ. of California Press. ISBN 0-520-24840-6.
- Kern, Robert W. (1995). The regions of Spain : a reference guide to history and culture. Westport, Conn. [u.a.]: Greenwood Press. ISBN 0-313-29224-8.
- Madariaga, Salvador de (1958). Spain: a modern history. Praeger.
- Ruiz, Teofilo F. (2001). Spanish society, 1400-1600 (1. publ. ed.). Harlow: Longman. ISBN 0-582-28692-1.
- Shubert, Adrian (2 September 2003). A Social History of Modern Spain. Routledge. ISBN 978-1-134-87552-8.
- Wulff, Fernando (2003). Las esencias patrias : historiografía e historia antigua en la construccion de la identidad española (siglos XVI-XX). Barcelona: Crítica. ISBN 978-84-8432-418-8.
