= Assembly of Ronda =

Gathering of Andalusian nationalists

The Flag of Andalusia. The coat of arms can be seen at the center of the flag.

The Assembly of Ronda (Spanish: Asamblea de Ronda) or Assembly of the Andalusian Provinces in Ronda (Spanish: Asamblea de las provincias andaluzas en Ronda) was a gathering of Andalusian nationalists convoked by the Centros Andaluces in Ronda, Province of Málaga in January 1918. It was the first Andalusian regionalist gathering to adopt what Blas Infante called "the insignia of Andalusia" (las insignias de Andalucía), now the flag and emblem of the autonomous community of Andalusia.

The assembly also adopted the projected 1883 Federal Constitution for Andalusia—the Constitution of Antequera—as a Magna Carta for Andalusia, and espoused a political program of putting it into practical effect, taking on the mantle of the Andalusianist movement of the late 19th century. The most immediate antecedent to the Assembly of Ronda was the foundation in 1916 of the first Centro Andaluz in Seville, presided over by Infante, and of the Andalusianist magazine Andalucía. The assembly discussed such topics as centralism, caciquismo, hunger, and bread and put forth a claim for "la Patria Andaluza" to the League of Nations. In that document, Andalusia was described as a país ("country") and a nacionalidad ("nationality").

The Assembly of Ronda was continued by the Assembly of Córdoba (1919).
