= Andalusians =

People of Andalusia, Spain

Andaluces (Spanish)
- Flag of Andalusia

Total population
- 10,000,000–11,000,000

Regions with significant populations
- Andalusia 8,379,248 (2017)

Diaspora
- Spain (other communities)
- Catalonia: 754,174 (2006)
- Madrid: 285,164 (2006)
- Valencia: 218,440 (2006)
- Balearic Islands: 71,940 (1991)
- Euskadi: 46,441 (1991)
- Murcia: 36,278 (1991)
- Navarre: 32,177 (1991)
- La Rioja (Spain): 29,167 (1991)
- Rest of Spain: 162,333 (1991)
- Other countries
- Brazil: 93,775 (2006) 8,000,000 (Includes those of mixed ancestry)
- France: 31,516 (2006)
- Cuba: 23,185 (2006)
- Rest of the world: 50,000

Languages
- Andalusian Spanish

Religion
- Catholic Christianity (see religion)

Related ethnic groups
- Other Spaniards (Castilians, Canary Islanders, Extremadurans), Gibraltarians, Barranquenhos, Catalans, Galicians

The Andalusians (Spanish: andaluces) are the people of Andalusia, an autonomous community in southern Spain. Andalusia's statute of autonomy defines Andalusians as the Spanish citizens who reside in any of the municipalities of Andalusia, as well as those Spaniards who reside abroad and had their last Spanish residence in Andalusia, and their descendants. Since its reform in 2007, the Andalusian statute of autonomy identifies the territory as a historic nationality in the preamble. The Spanish Language Academy recognizes Andalusian Spanish as a set of diverse dialects. Andalusian nationalism is the belief that Andalusians are a nation separate from other ethnicities within Spain.

== History and culture ==
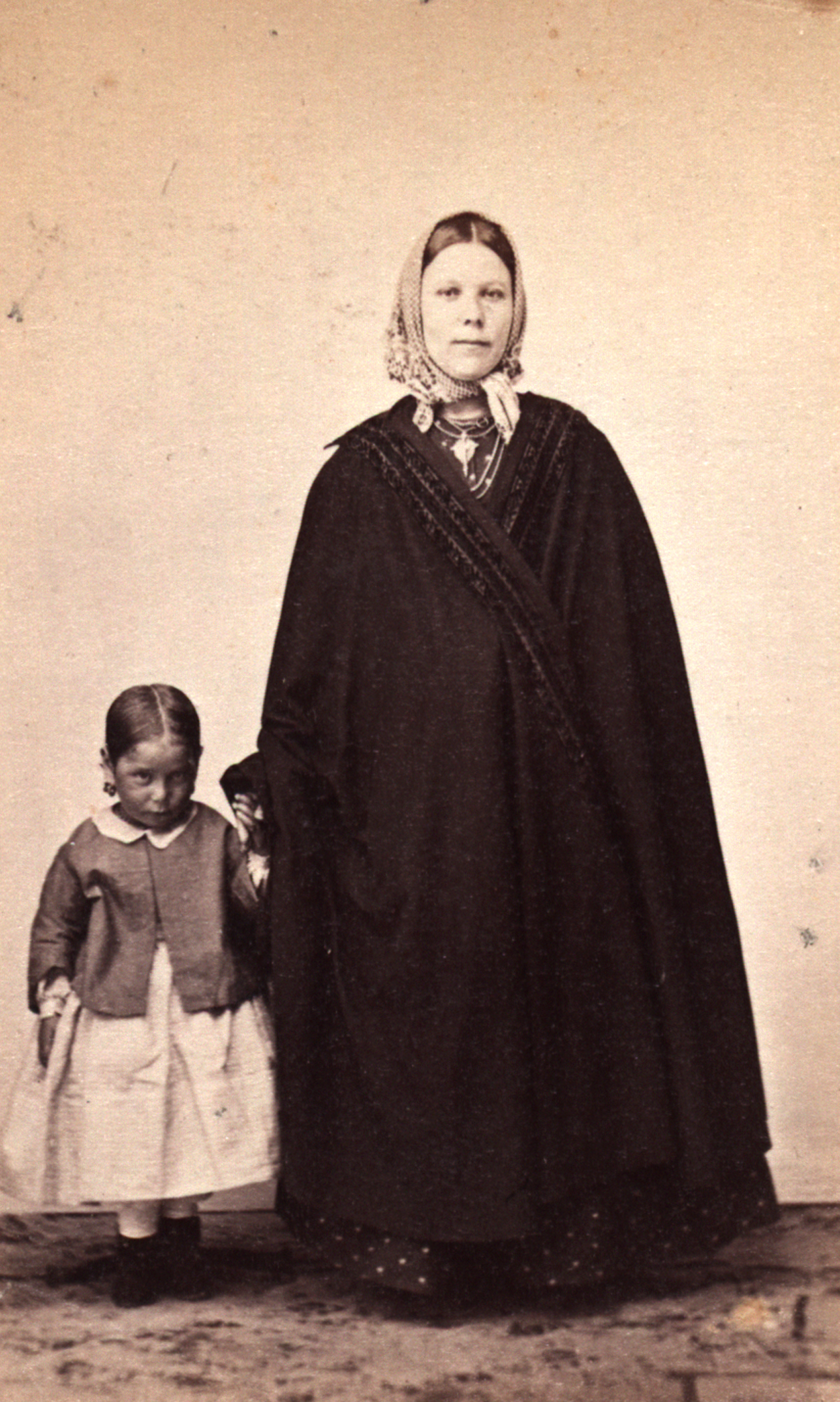
Andalusian child and woman, c. 1868

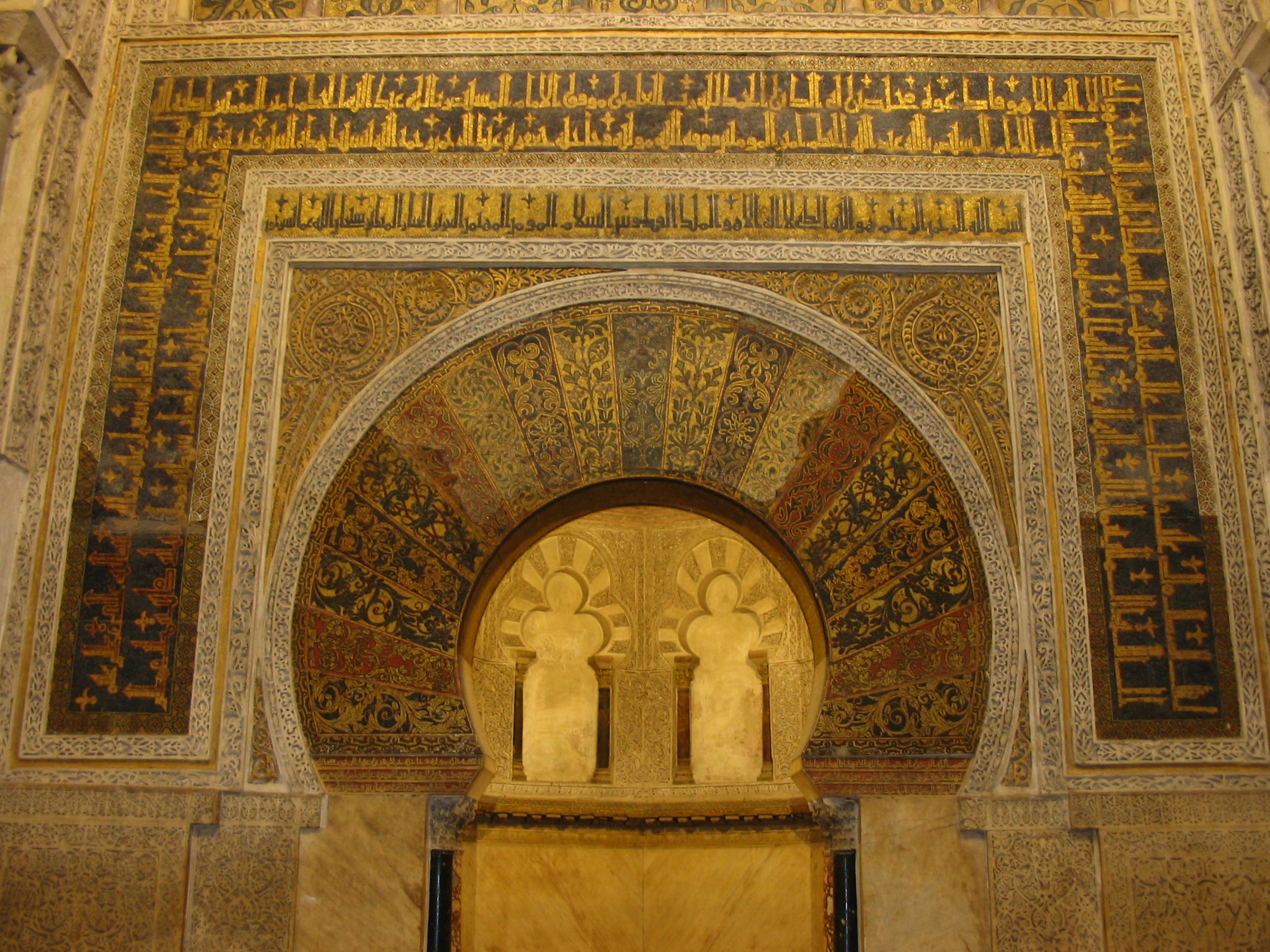
Moorish architecture in the mihrab of the Mosque–Cathedral of Córdoba

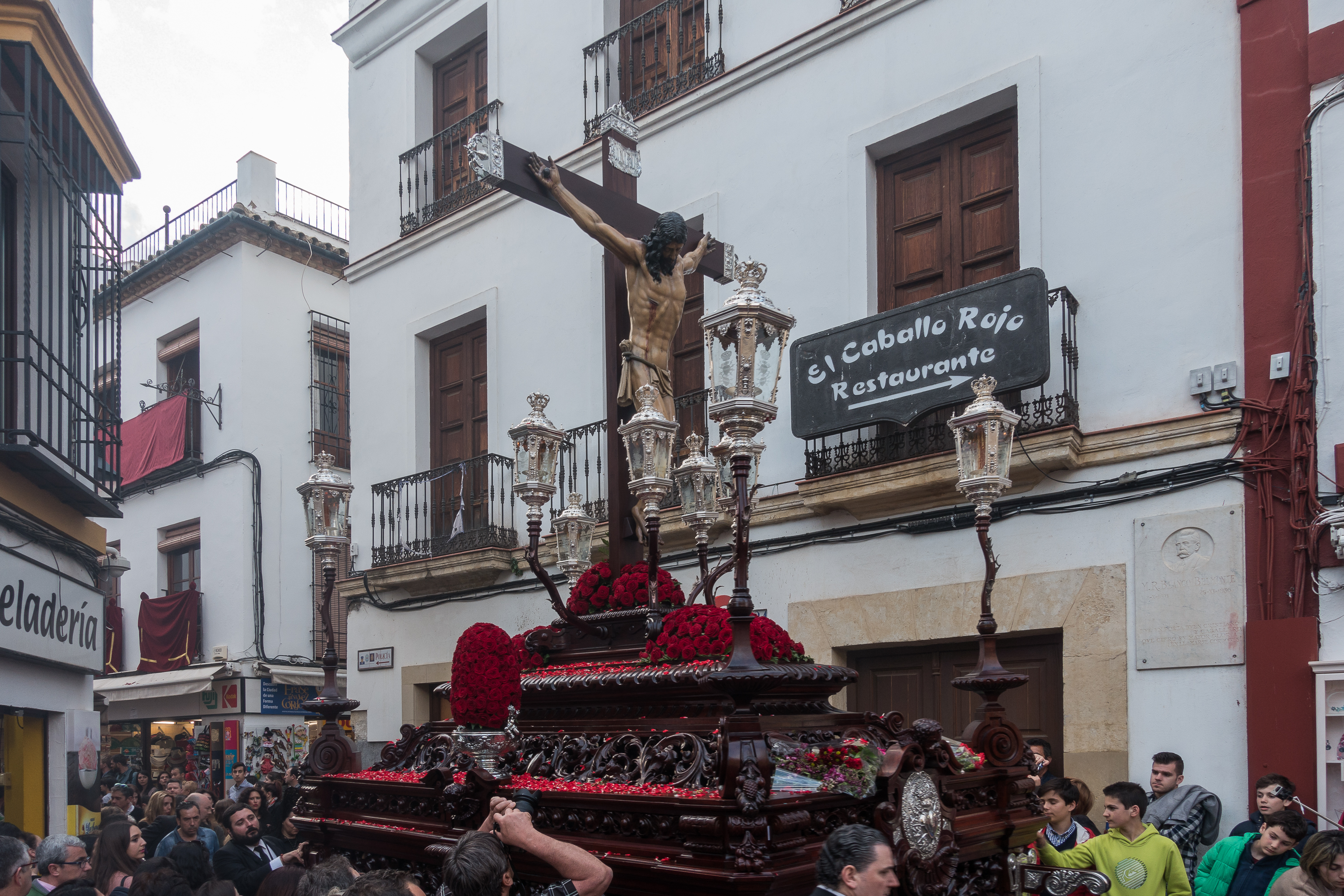
Holy Week procession in Córdoba

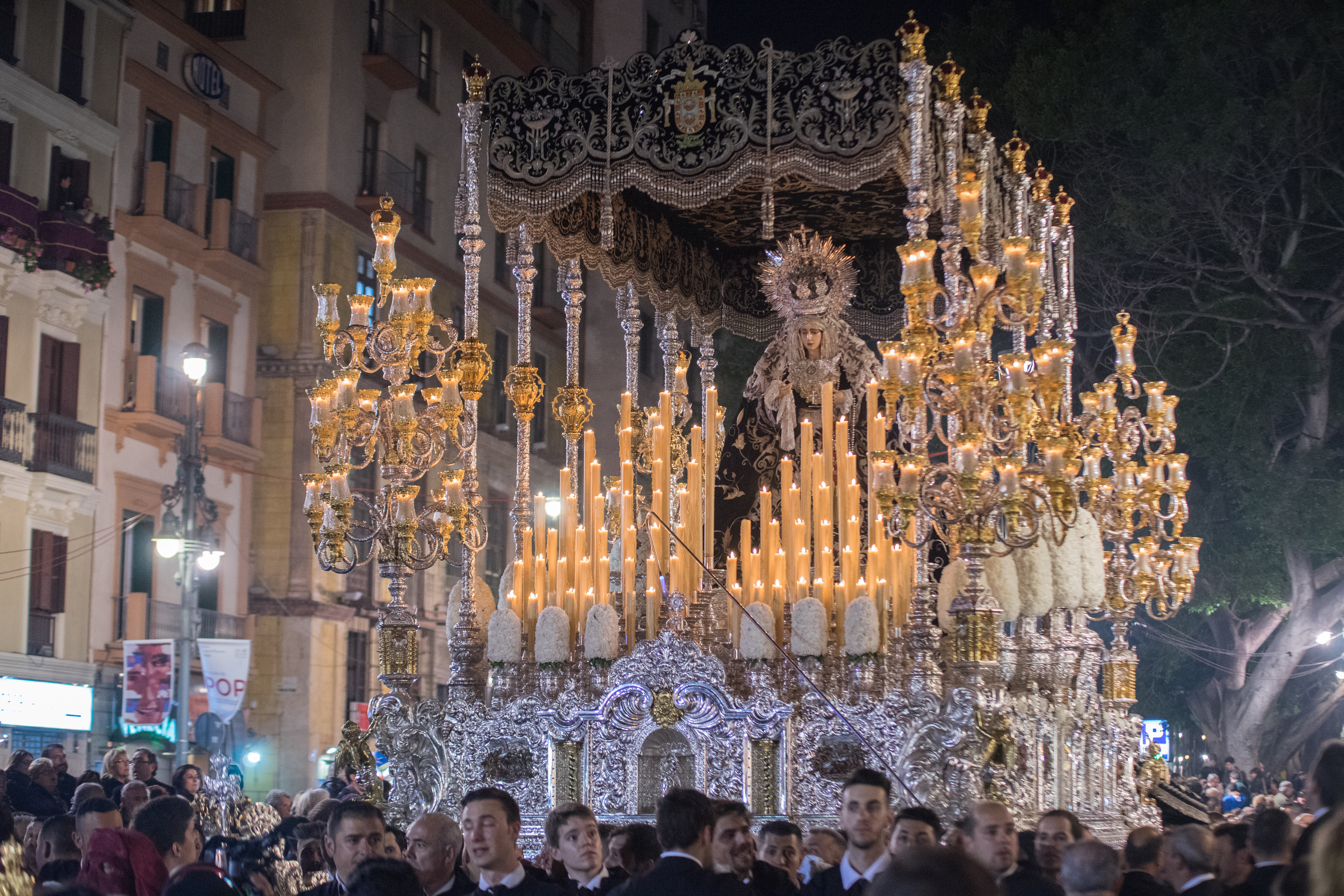
Holy Week procession in Málaga

In Antiquity, Andalusian people used to trade with Phoenicians and Jews some thousand years before Christianity, and they were called as Tarshish or Tartessos in the Old Testament and Greek texts. The genesis of modern Andalusian culture can be traced to the incorporation of the Moors territory to the Crown of Castile during the Middle Ages at the end of the Reconquista. It also coincides with the arrival of the Gitanos in the mid 15th century who also contributed to the culture of modern Andalusia and the expels of non-converted Muslims and Jews in 1492, and finally with the forced expulsion of all moriscos of Spain between 1609 and 1613. Subsequently the region was influential in the development of the Columbian exchange and global trade where Seville and Cadiz took a fundamental part. In fact, Blas Infante, the creator of Andalusian nationalism, drew heavily from the Regenerationism movement in Spain after the loss of Spain's last territories in the Caribbean and Asia in the Spanish–American War conflict.

There is a binomial denomination of Andalusia as High and Low, where High refers to the territory in the Baetic system and Low to the valley of the Guadalquivir river (that descends from the Baetic system to the Atlantic Ocean). The autonomous community institutions are in a good part in Low Andalusia (Seville). When that has been seen as a source of centrism there have been groups formed to make the problems visible. An example was the lack of a Spanish high speed train to Granada. The service has since launched, starting in 2019.

The Andalusians have a rich traditional culture which includes Flamenco style of music and dance developed in Andalusia and the Americas in the 19th and 20th centuries. Another example of traditional culture is the Holy Week ("Semana Santa"), shared with other Hispanic countries in America or the Philippines (see Holy Week in Spain, Holy Week observances and Holy Week in the Philippines). Spanish Catholic religion constitute a traditional vehicle of Andalusian cultural cohesion and the levels of participation seems to be independent of political preferences and orthodoxy. All the different regions of Andalusia have developed their own distinctive customs, but all share a connectedness to Catholicism as developed during baroque Spain society.

== Geographical location and population ==
Andalusian people live mainly in Spain's eight southernmost provinces: Almería, Cádiz, Córdoba, Granada, Huelva, Jaén, Málaga, and Seville, which all are part of the region and modern Autonomous Community of Andalusia. In January 2006 the total population of this region stood at 7,849,799; Andalucía is the most populous region of Spain. In comparison with the rest of Spain, Andalusia population growth has been slower and it continues to be sparsely populated in some rural areas (averaging just 84 inh. per km^{2}). Since 1960, the region's share of total population has declined, despite birth rates being about 40 percent higher than the Spanish average during past decades (currently it is only 13% higher.) Between 1951 and 1975, over 1.7 million Andalusian people emigrated out of the region to other areas of Spain. This figure was approximately a 24% of the population of Andalusia as a whole, mostly hitting the countryside areas. The main recipients of this migration were Catalonia (989,256 people of Andalusian origin in 1975), Community of Madrid (330,479) and Valencian Community (217,636), and to a lesser level, the Basque Country and Balearic Islands.

From 1962 until 1974, approximately 700,000 people — almost all of them males — moved abroad for economic reasons, mainly originating from the provinces of Granada, Jaén and Córdoba. Their preferred destinations were France, Germany and Switzerland, followed by the United Kingdom, Netherlands, and Belgium. There are no official recorded figures for previous decades.

In South America in the last twenty years of 19th century, over 150,000 Andalusians emigrated to the Americas as a result of crop failures caused by the Phylloxera plague. Many Andalusian peasants moved to Brazil to work in the coffee plantations, mainly in rural areas of São Paulo State. There are currently around 16 million Brazilians of Spanish descent, of whom half are of Andalusian origin (around 8 million).

Spanish immigrants to Hawai'i who were solicited to work in the sugar industry, arrived in October 1898, numbering 7,735 men, women and children by 1913. Most of them came from Andalusia, home of Don Marin. However, unlike other plantation immigrant groups, the Spanish moved on, and by 1930 only 1,219 remained, including a scant eight children born in Hawai'i. Most Spanish people left for the promising fields of California to make higher wages and live among relatives and friends who had settled in greater numbers there.

Additionally, Andalusians formed the major component of Spanish immigration to certain parts of Spain's American and Asian empire and the largest group to participate in the colonisation of the Canary Islands. Principally, Andalusians and their descendants predominate in the Canary Islands (Spain), Mexico, the Caribbean islands (Puerto Rico, Dominican Republic, and Cuba), and the circum-Caribbean area (Guatemala, Costa Rica, Panama, the Caribbean coast of Colombia, and in Venezuela). They were also predominant in the Rio de la Plata region of Argentina and Uruguay, and in the coastal areas of Chile, Peru, and Ecuador.

== Migration rationale ==
Some descriptions of the south of Spain highlights the landownership system, in the past often formed by large estates called latifundios, as a relevant force in shaping the region and migratory past dynamics. These wide expanses of land have their origins in landowning patterns that stretch back to Roman times; in grants of land made to the nobility, to the military orders, and to the church during the Reconquest (Reconquista) as well as in laws of the nineteenth century by which church and common lands were sold in large tracts to the urban middle class. The workers of this land, called jornaleros (peasants without land), were themselves landless.

This economic and cultural system produced a distinctive perspective, involving class consciousness and class conflicts as well as significant emigration. In contrast to the much smaller farm towns and villages of northern Spain, where the land was worked by its owners, class distinctions in the agro-towns of Andalusia stood out. The families of the landless farmers lived at, or near, the poverty level, and their relations with the landed gentry were marked by conflict at times. Conditions were often improved by the opportunities to migrate to other parts of Spain, or to other countries in Western Europe. Some of this migration was seasonal; for example, in 1982, 80,000 farmers, mostly Andalusians, migrated to France for the wine harvest. Part of the migration consisted of entire families who intended to remain in their new home for longer periods or perhaps forever.

Economic growth and social mobility, although dispersed and not homogeneous in the region, fundamentally started in the 1960s, increased in the 1970s, and were intensified by the development of agroindustrial, tourism, and services sectors during democracy in the 1980s. Since 1990, Andalusia and other regions followed a dynamic convergence process and has moved closer in development to the most advanced regions in Europe; more and more it comes closer to overcome the average of European living standards – causing some provinces' areas to be, in the last decades, net immigration recipients as well.

== See also ==
- Andalusian cuisine
- Andalusian nationalism
- Andalusian language movement
- List of Andalusians
- Medieval Arabic female poets#Andalus Period (711–1492 CE)
- Music of Andalusia
- Nationalities in Spain
- Spanish people
