= Assembly of Córdoba (1919) =

The Assembly of Córdoba (also 1919 Assembly of Córdoba, etc.; Spanish: Asamblea de Córdoba de 1919) was an autonomist assembly of the Junta Liberalista de Andalucía (an outgrowth of the Andalusian nationalist Centros Andaluces), which advocated the abolition of centralized political power in Spain and the creation instead of a Spanish Federation. It took place January 1, 1919.

The assembly adopted a federalist manifesto dubbed the Manifiesto de la Nacionalidad ("Manifesto of Nationality"), which proclaimed the necessity that Andalusia constitute an autonomous democracy ("democracia autónoma") and the arrival of the "supreme hour in which the definitive end of the old Spain" would be achieved" ("la hora suprema en que habrá de consumarse definitivamente el acabamiento de la vieja España"). The authors of the manifesto, among them Blas Infante and Lasso de la Vega, took as a point of reference the Constitution of Antequera adopted by the Federalist Assembly at Antequera in 1883 and the Assembly of Ronda (1918), which had proclaimed Andalusia as a "national reality" ("realidad nacional") and "a country" ("una patria").

The present Statute of Autonomy of the current autonomous community of Andalusia (adopted 2007) refers to this manifesto to justify the expression "realidad nacional", which appears in its preamble.
