= Platform for Eastern Andalusia =

Spanish organization

Location of Eastern Andalusia in Spain.

The Platform for Eastern Andalusia (Spanish: Plataforma por Andalucía Oriental – P.A.O.) is a Spanish organization with regionalist character, set up juridically as an association, created from a civic initiative in the provinces of Jaén, Granada and Almería, with the objective of forming an autonomous community including these three provinces as Eastern Andalusia.

== Ideology ==
The Platform for Eastern Andalusia is opposed to the unitary andalusianism by Blas Infante, which defends the administrative unity of whole Andalusia. This platform defends the effective autonomic decentralization and rejects the centralism of Andalusian Autonomous Government. It also rejects every form of new centralisms. This platform defends the conservation and promotion of the tradition and culture of the provinces of Jaén, Granada and Almería, that according with the members of this platform, have been ignored due to the cultural colonisation imposed from Seville. It supports the plurality of ideologies, without being defined into any position of the political spectrum.

== History of the regionalist movement of Eastern Andalusia ==
=== 19th century ===
In 1873, during the First Spanish Republic, a draft of Constitution was drawn up, which defined Spain as a Federal Republic, made up by seventeen states with legislative, executive and judicial power. The first article of this draft says:

Componen la Nación Española los Estados de Andalucía Alta, Andalucía Baja, Aragón, Asturias, Baleares, Canarias, Castilla la Nueva, Castilla la Vieja, Cataluña, Cuba, Extremadura, Galicia, Murcia, Navarra, Puerto Rico, Valencia, Regiones Vascongadas. (The Spanish nation is composed by the States of Upper Andalusia, Lower Andalusia, Aragon, Asturias, Balearic Islands, Canary Islands, New Castile, Old Castile, Catalonia, Cuba, Extremadura, Galicia, Murcia, Navarre, Puerto Rico, Valencia, Basque Country).

In the latter years of the 19th century, with an ideology of liberalism latent among the regionalism of Granada, the jurist and journalist Paco Seco de Lucena and Juan Echevarría kept alive the idea of political community of Eastern Andalusia during the Restoration. They achieved the meeting of the Regionalist Assembly on 16 May 1897 in the city hall of Granada, where important conferences and debates were offered in educated circles. Paco Seco de Lucena offered a conference titled "The Regionalism" on 6 January 1898 in the Chamber of Commerce of Granada and he concluded that this one was the most guessed right way of giving solution to the local needs, in view of the approximation of the political management to the problems.

In 1898, the Spanish writer and diplomat Ángel Ganivet declared:

yo, que soy andaluz, declaro que Andalucía políticamente no es nada, y que al formarse las regiones habría que reconocer dos Andalucías: la alta y la baja; el mismo Pi y Margall, en Las Nacionalidades, las admite. (I, that I am Andalusian, declare that Andalusia politically is nothing, and that on the regions having been formed there would be necessary to recognize two Andalusias: the High and the Low; the same Pi y Margall, in Las Nacionalidades, admits them).

=== Second Spanish Republic ===
At the beginning of the 20th century, inside the Andalusian regionalism, there arose several regionalist voices who were claiming certain administrative cohesion of the Eastern Andalusian provinces, by means of the creation of a "Commonwealth of Eastern Andalusia" or "Commonwealth of the High Andalusia", like the Commonwealth of Catalonia. Nevertheless, up to the proclamation of the Second Spanish Republic and the promulgation of the Constitution of 1931, there was not opened the legal possibility of granting certain political autonomy to the Spanish regions.

Taking refuge in this possibility that was allowed by the new constitution, the andalucists began to promote the political autonomy of Andalusia. In the Andalucist Assembly of Cordoba of 1933, in which there was debated a Preliminary design of the Statute of autonomy of Andalusia, the differences between the unitary andalusianism and the regionalism of Eastern Andalusia provoked the abandonment of the assembly on the part of the representatives of Almeria, Granada and Jaén.

=== Spanish transition to democracy ===
Flag of Eastern Andalusia designed by Granada leaders of UCD during the process of constitution of the Autonomous Community of Andalusia

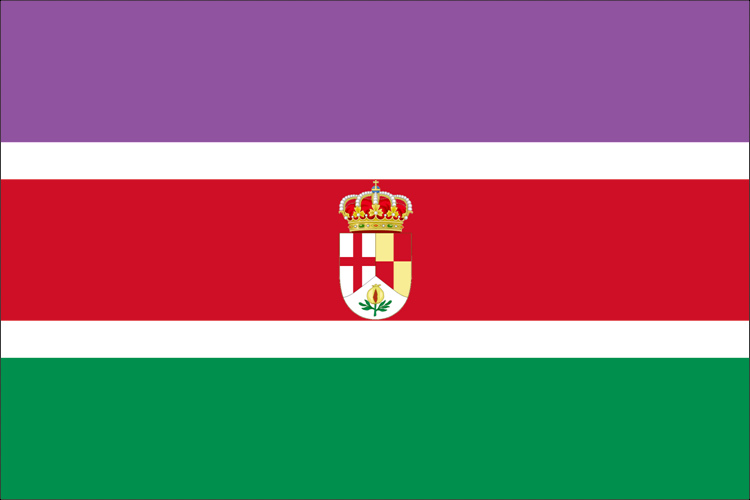
Flag of Eastern Andalusia, proposed by the P.A.O.

During the Spanish transition, with the promulgation of the Constitution of 1978, there was re-opened in Spain the autonomous process initiated in the Second Republic and interrupted by the Civil War and the Franco's regime.

In case of Andalusia, the UCD was in opposition to initiating the autonomous process across the article 151, which the Constitution had established for the historical nationalities, defending the application of 143, which provided fewer autonomous competitions. Therefore, the UCD called on to the abstention in the referendum that had to ratify the initiatives of the incipient Andalusian Autonomous Government. In this scenario, the UCD of Granada managed to create the flag of Eastern Andalusia, which used in regionalist demonstration that summoned under slogans as "Is Andalusia Seville? NOT, NOT, NOT" and "For the real autonomy".

== See also ==
- Kingdom of Granada
