= List of Andalusians =

The following table groups the list of notable Andalusians listed in alphabetical order within categories:

== Bullfighters ==
Name	Occupation	Place of birth	Date of birth	Date of death
Juan Belmonte	Bullfighter	Seville	1892	1962
Manuel Benítez, a.k.a. El Cordobés	Bullfighter	Palma del Río	1936	-
Jose Gomez, a.k.a. Joselito	Bullfighter	Gelves	1895	1920
Rafael Guerra, a.k.a. Guerrita	Bullfighter	Córdoba	1862	1941
Rafael Molina, a.k.a. Lagartijo	Bullfighter	Córdoba	1841	1900
Francisco Montes, a.k.a. Paquiro	Bullfighter	Chiclana de la Frontera	1804	1851
Antonio Ordóñez	Bullfighter	Ronda	1932	1998
Cayetano Ordóñez, a.k.a. El Niño de La Palma	Bullfighter	Ronda	1904	1961
Manuel Laureano Rodríguez, a.k.a. Manolete	Bullfighter	Córdoba	1917	1947
Francisco Rivera Pérez, a.k.a. Paquirri	Bullfighter	Cádiz	1948	1984
Curro Romero	Bullfighter	Camas	1933	-

== Explorers and Conquistadors ==
Name	Occupation	Place of birth	Date of birth	Date of death
Juan Díaz de Solís	Navigator and explorer	Lebrija	1470	1516
Álvar Núñez Cabeza de Vaca	First European to explore the southwestern of United States	Jerez de la Frontera	1490	1559
Juan Rodrigo Bermejo, a.k.a. Rodrigo de Triana	Sailor, the first to see America's coast in the Columbus' first expedition	Seville	1469	??
Pedro Alonso Niño	Navigator and explorer	Moguer	1468	1505
Juan de Padilla	Missionary and protomartyr of United States	unknown	1492	1544
Martín Alonso Pinzón	Navigator and explorer. He participated in Columbus' first expedition as captain of the Pinta	Palos de la Frontera	1441	1495
Vicente Yáñez Pinzón	Navigator, explorer and conquistador. He participated in Columbus' first expedition as captain of the Niña	Palos de la Frontera	1460	1523

== Leaders and politicians ==
Name	Occupation	Place of birth	Date of birth	Date of death
Abd-ar-Rahman III	Emir and first Caliph of Córdoba	Córdoba	891	961
Niceto Alcalá-Zamora	First Prime Minister and first President of the Second Spanish Republic	Priego de Córdoba	1877	1949
Al-Mansur aka Almanzor	Muslim general and statesman	Algeciras	940	1002
Javier Arenas	Former deputy Prime Minister (Vicepresidente) of Spain	Seville	1957	-
Arganthonios	King of Tartessia	Tartessos	670 BC	550 BC
Alvaro de Bazan	Admiral	Granada	1526	1588
Boabdil	Last Muslim king of Granada	Granada	1452	1528
Antonio Cánovas del Castillo	Historian, Prime Minister of Spain and creator of the Restoration of the Spanish Bourbon monarchy	Málaga	1828	1897
Emilio Castelar	Writer and politician, fourth and last President of the First Spanish Republic	Cádiz	1832	1899
Manuel Chaves González	President of the Autonomous Community of Andalucía	Ceuta	1945	-
Gonzalo Fernández de Córdoba aka El Gran Capitan	General and statesman, the Father of trench warfare	Montilla	1453	1515
Bernardo de Gálvez	General and governor of Louisiana, aided the United States in the American Revolutionary War	Málaga	1758	1852
Felipe González	Former Prime Minister of Spain	Seville	1942	-
Alfonso Guerra	Former deputy Prime Minister (Vicepresidente) of Spain	Seville	1940	-
Hadrian	Roman emperor	Italica	76	138
Blas Infante	Politician and writer, leading exponent of Andalusian nationalism	Casares	1885	1936
Luisa of Medina-Sidonia	Queen-consort of Portugal	Sanlúcar de Barrameda	1613	1666
Antonio (Lopez) de Mendoza	First viceroy of New Spain and third viceroy of Peru	Granada	1495	1552
Ramón Maria Narvaez	General and Prime Minister of Spain	Loja	1800	1868
Aguas Santas Ocaña Navarro	First Lady of Honduras	Brenes	1963	-
Miguel Primo de Rivera	General and dictator of Spain	Jerez de la Frontera	1870	1930
Nicolás Salmerón	Politician and philosopher, third President of the First Spanish Republic	Alhama de Almería	1838	1908
Trajan	Roman emperor	Italica	53	117
Antonio de Ulloa	General, explorer, writer and first Spanish governor of Louisiana	Seville	1716	1795
José Cobo Cano	Archbishop of the Archdiocese of Madrid	Sabiote	1965	-

== Musicians ==
Name	Occupation	Place of birth	Date of birth	Date of death
Sara Baras	Flamenco dancer	Cádiz	1971	-
David Bisbal	Pop singer	Almería	1979	-
Joaquín Cortés	Flamenco dancer	Córdoba	1969	-
Vicente Espinel	Writer and musician of the Spanish Golden Age. Added the fifth string to the guitar	Ronda	1550	1624
Manuel de Falla	Composer of classical music	Cádiz	1876	1946
José Fernández Torres, aka Tomatito	Flamenco guitarist	Almería	1958	-
Lola Flores	Singer, dancer and actress	Jerez de la Frontera	1923	1995
Rosa María García García, aka Niña Pastori	Flamenco singer	San Fernando	1978	-
Manuel García Escobar, aka Manolo Escobar	Pop Singer	El Ejido	1931	-
Rocío Jurado	Singer and actress	Chipiona	1944	2006
Las Ketchup	Singers	Córdoba	N/A	-
Alonso Lobo	Composer of the late Renaissance	Osuna	1555	1617
Los del Río	Singers	Dos Hermanas	N/A	-
Rafael Martos, aka Raphael	Singer	Linares	1945	-
Ana Mena	Singer	Málaga	1997	-
José Monje Cruz aka Camarón de la Isla	Flamenco singer	Cádiz	1950	1992
Cristóbal de Morales	Composer of the Renaissance	Seville	1500	1553
Isabel Pantoja	Singer and actress	Seville	1952	-
Manuel del Pópulo Vicente García	Opera tenor	Seville	1775	1832
Miguel Ríos	Singer	Chauchina	1944	-
Joaquín Sabina	Singer-songwriter	Úbeda	1949	-
Francisco Sánchez, aka Paco de Lucía	Flamenco guitarist, Prince of Asturias Prize	Algeciras	1947	2014
Andrés Segovia	Classical guitarist	Linares	1893	1987
Joaquín Turina	Composer of classical music	Seville	1882	1949
Eva Yerbabuena	Flamenco dancer	Granada	1970	-
Vicente Amigo	Flamenco guitarist	Seville	1967	

== Sculptors and painters ==
Name	Occupation	Place of birth	Date of birth	Date of death
Alonso Cano	Painter, architect and sculptor	Granada	1601	1667
Juan Martínez Montañés	Sculptor	Alcalá la Real	1568	1649
Bartolomé Esteban Murillo	Painter	Seville	1618	1682
Antonio León Ortega	Sculptor	Ayamonte	1907	1991
Francisco Pacheco	Painter, teacher of Diego Velázquez and Alonso Cano	Sanlúcar de Barrameda	1564	1664
Pablo Picasso	Painter and sculptor	Málaga	1881	1972
Daniel Vázquez Díaz	Painter	Nerva	1882	1969
Diego Velázquez	Painter	Seville	1599	1660

== Philosophers and humanists ==
Name	Occupation	Place of birth	Date of birth	Date of death
Averroes	Philosopher and physician	Córdoba	1126	1198
Bartolome de las Casas	Advocate of the rights of Native Americans	Seville	1484	1566
Antonio de Nebrija	Published the first grammar of the Spanish language in 1492	Lebrija	1441	1522
Maimonides	Jewish rabbi, physician and philosopher	Córdoba	1135	1204
Seneca	Roman stoic philosopher and statesman	Córdoba	4 BC	65 AC
Ibn Arabi	Arab Muslim mystic and philosopher	Murcia	1165	1240
Ibn Hazm	Philosopher, littérateur, historian, jurist and theologian	Córdoba	994	1064
Qadi Iyad	Islamic jurist and theologian	Ceuta	1083	1149
Francisco Suarez	Philosopher and theologian, the greatest scholastic after Thomas Aquinas	Granada	1548	1617
María Zambrano	Philosopher and writer, Miguel de Cervantes Prize, Prince of Asturias Prize	Vélez-Málaga	1904	1991
Jesús Padilla Gálvez	Philosopher and writer	Almería	1959	

== Sportspeople ==
Name	Occupation	Place of birth	Date of birth	Date of death
Diego Capel	Football player	Albox	1988	-
Pedro Carrasco	Boxer	Alosno	1943	2001
Manu del Moral	Footballer	Jaén	1986	-
Paquillo Fernández	Athletics	Guadix	1977	-
Luis Fernandez	Former French international football player	Tarifa	1959	-
Daniel Güiza	European Championship winning football player	Jerez de la Frontera	1980	-
Juanito Gómez	Former football player and coach	Fuengirola	1954	1992
Juanito Gutiérrez	European Championship winning football player	Cádiz	1976	-
Fernando Hierro	Former football player and captain of Real Madrid	Vélez-Málaga	1968	-
Miguel Ángel Jiménez	Golfer	Málaga	1964	-
José Manuel Jurado	Footballer	Sanlúcar de Barrameda	1986	-
Juan Ramón López Caro	Former coach of Real Madrid	Lebrija	1969	-
Antonio Maeso	Motorcycling	Almería	1979	-
Carlos Marchena	World Cup and European Championship winning Football player	Seville	1979	-
Kiko	Former football player	Jerez de la Frontera	1972	-
Jesús Navas	World Cup winning football player	Los Palacios y Villafranca	1985	-
Manuel Orantes	Tennis player	Granada	1949	-
Miguel Pardeza	Former football player, part of La Quinta del Buitre	La Palma del Condado	1965	-
Antonio Puerta	Former football player	Seville	1984	2007
Sergio Ramos	World Cup and European Championship winning Football player	Camas	1986	-
Felipe Reyes	2006 FIBA World Championship winning basketball player	Córdoba	1980	-
José Antonio Reyes	Football player	Utrera	1983	2019
Joaquín Sánchez	Football player	El Puerto de Santa María	1981	-
Diego Tristán	Football player	La Algaba	1976	-

== Writers ==
Name	Occupation	Place of birth	Date of birth	Date of death
Pedro Antonio de Alarcón	Novelist and politician	Guadix	1833	1891
Rafael Ábalos	Novelist, children's fantasy	Archidona	1956	
Rafael Alberti	Poet and Miguel de Cervantes Prize	El Puerto de Santa María	1902	1999
Vicente Aleixandre	Poet, Nobel Prize in Literature	Seville	1898	1984
Mateo Alemán	Novelist	Seville	1547	1609
Manuel Altolaguirre	Poet, a member of Generation of '27	Málaga	1905	1959
Francisco Ayala	Novelist, Miguel de Cervantes Prize, Prince of Asturias Prize	Granada	1906	2009
Gustavo Adolfo Bécquer	Romantic poet and tale writer	Seville	1836	1870
Luis Cernuda	Poet	Seville	1902	1963
Abd Al Munim Al Gilyani	Physician, writer, and poet given the nickname "The wise man of time"	Galiana	531	603
Federico García Lorca	Poet and playwright	Granada	1898	1936
Luis de Góngora	Poet during the Spanish Golden Age	Córdoba	1561	1627
Juan Ramón Jiménez	Poet and Nobel Prize in Literature	Moguer	1881	1958
Lucan	Roman poet	Córdoba	39	65
Antonio Machado	Poet, one of the leading exponents of the Generation of '98	Seville	1875	1939
Manuel Machado	Poet and figure of the Modernism, brother of Antonio Machado	Seville	1874	1947
Emilio Prados	Poet, member of Generation of '27	Málaga	1899	1962
Luis Rosales	Poet, Miguel de Cervantes Prize	Granada	1910	1992
Lope de Rueda	Playwright	Seville	1510	1565
Seneca the Elder	Roman rhetorician and writer	Córdoba	54 BC	39 AC
Manuel Andújar	Novelist, poet, playwright and essayist	La Carolina	1913	1994
