= 2017 Isle of Man TT =

Annual motorcycle racing event

2017 Isle of Man TT Races
- Isle of Man TT Mountain Course layout

Race details
- Date: 27 May, 2017 – 9 June, 2017
- Location: Douglas, Isle of Man
- Course: Isle of Man TT Mountain Course; 37.733 mi (60.725 km)

The 2017 Isle of Man TT was held between 27 May and 9 June, on the Isle of Man TT Mountain Course.

The event saw adverse weather conditions which caused many delays and the cancellation of the second Supersport race.

Just like 2016, the solo classes were marked by an intense rivalry between Michael Dunlop and Ian Hutchinson. This rivalry culminated in the 2017 Senior TT, won by Dunlop, while Hutchinson suffered serious leg injuries in a race-stopping crash in the mountain section. In the end, Hutchinson and Dunlop left the island with 2 TT wins each.

Ben and Tom Birchall won two Sidecar TTs, while the two remaining solo races were taken by Michael Rutter and Bruce Anstey.

23-times TT winner John McGuinness was a major absentee due to career-threatening injuries suffered at the North West 200 a few weeks prior.

Guy Martin made a high-profile return to the event, but suffered a high speed crash in the Superbike TT, and withdrew from the Senior TT. He took second place in the TT Zero, his only race-finish of the week.

The event was marred by the deaths of 3 competitors: Davey Lambert, Jochem van den Hoek, and Alan Bonner.

== Results ==
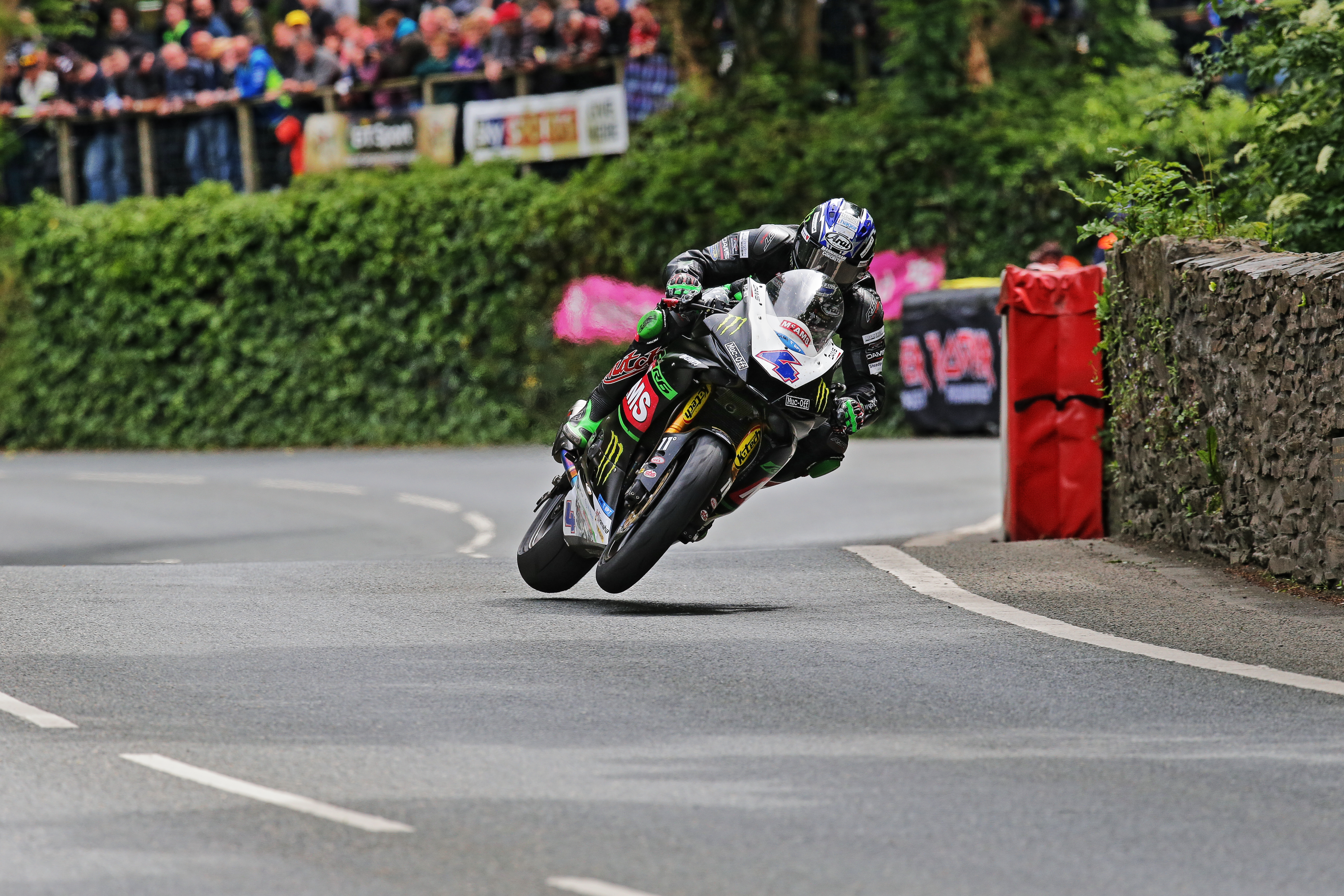
Ian Hutchinson (pictured on his Supersport bike) took 2 wins.

Superbike TT

Position	Number	Rider	Machine	Time	Speed (mph)
1	4	(England) Ian Hutchinson	BMW	01:45:58.474	128.170
2	10	(England) Peter Hickman	BMW	01:46:03.544	128.068
3	9	(England) Dean Harrison	Kawasaki	01:46:11.545	127.907
4	3	(England) James Hillier	Kawasaki	01:46:13.281	127.873
5	14	(Isle of Man) Dan Kneen	BMW	01:47:50.068	125.960
6	11	(England) Michael Rutter	BMW	01:47:50.203	125.957
7	1	(Australia) David Johnson	Norton	01:48:25.512	125.273
8	16	(Australia) Josh Brookes	Norton	01:48:39.174	125.011
9	15	(Northern Ireland) William Dunlop	Yamaha	01:48:50.858	124.787
10	18	(England) Martin Jessopp	BMW	01:48:53.943	124.728

Superstock TT

Position	Number	Rider	Machine	Time	Speed (mph)
1	4	(England) Ian Hutchinson	BMW	01:09:59.261	129.383
2	10	(England) Peter Hickman	BMW	01:10:21.684	128.696
3	14	(Isle of Man) Dan Kneen	BMW	01:10:42.708	128.058
4	11	(England) Michael Rutter	BMW	01:10:52.862	127.752
5	9	(England) Dean Harrison	Kawasaki	01:10:54.002	127.718
6	6	(Northern Ireland) Michael Dunlop	Suzuki	01:11:03.037	127.447
7	15	(Northern Ireland) William Dunlop	Yamaha	01:12:04.373	125.639
8	1	(Australia) David Johnson	BMW	01:12:11.733	125.426
9	29	(England) Jamie Coward	BMW	01:12:39.386	124.630
10	22	(Austria) Horst Saiger	Kawasaki	01:12:58.409	124.089

Lightweight TT

Position	Number	Rider	Machine	Time	Speed (mph)
1	4	(England) Michael Rutter	Paton	01:16:19.324	118.645
2	3	(England) Martin Jessopp	Kawasaki	01:16:28.142	118.417
3	10	(England) Peter Hickman	Kawasaki	01:17:08.637	117.381
4	2	(England) Ivan Lintin	Kawasaki	01:17:40.865	116.569
5	5	(England) Daniel Cooper	Kawasaki	01:17:57.900	116.144
6	14	(Australia) Josh Brookes	Kawasaki	01:18:23.270	115.518
7	6	(Northern Ireland) Michael Dunlop	Kawasaki	01:18:30.418	115.343
8	8	(England) James Cowton	Kawasaki	01:19:21.307	114.110
9	22	(Republic of Ireland) Michael Sweeney	Kawasaki	01:20:10.134	112.952
10	30	(England) Jamie Hodson	Kawasaki	01:20:48.734	112.052

TT Zero

Position	Number	Rider	Machine	Time	Speed (mph)
1	1	(New Zealand) Bruce Anstey	Mugen	19:13.924	117.710
2	2	(England) Guy Martin	Mugen	19:55.331	113.632
3	6	(England) Daley Mathison	University of Nottingham	20:43.748	109.209
4	3	(England) Dean Harrison	Sarolea	20:56.924	108.064
5	7	(Spain) Antonio Maeso	University of Nottingham	24:49.385	91.197
6	11	(England) James Cowton	Brunel	24:53.229	90.963
7	14	(England) Adam Child	MCN	28:42.662	78.848
8	8	(Wales) Matthew Rees	University of Bath	29:14.549	77.415

Sidecar TT 1

Position	Number	Rider & Passenger	Machine	Time	Speed (mph)
1	1	Ben Birchall & Tom Birchall	LCR Honda	58:31.967	116.027
2	3	John Holden & Lee Cain	LCR Honda	58:57.636	115.185
3	2	Dave Molyneux & Daniel Sayle	Yamaha DMR	59:16.353	114.579
4	7	Alan Founds & Jake Lowther	Yamaha	59:22.006	114.397
5	5	Tim Reeves & Mark Wilkes	Honda	59:36.012	113.949
6	6	Pete Founds & Jevan Walmsley	Suzuki FoundsLCR	01:00:01.277	113.15
7	4	Conrad Harrison & Andrew Winkle	Honda Rod Bellas	01:01:49.757	109.841
8	11	Tony Baker & Fiona Baker-Milligan	Suzuki	01:02:31.981	108.605
9	8	Karl Bennett & Maxime Vasseur	DMR	01:02:52.131	108.025
10	12	Wayne Lockey & Mark Sayers	Ireson Honda	01:03:03.172	107.710

Supersport TT 1

Position	Number	Rider	Machine	Time	Speed (mph)
1	6	(Northern Ireland) Michael Dunlop	Yamaha	01:12:48.601	124.368
2	3	(England) James Hillier	Kawasaki	01:13:01.845	123.992
3	10	(England) Peter Hickman	Triumph	01:13:14.613	123.631
4	15	(Northern Ireland) William Dunlop	Yamaha	01:13:24.040	123.367
5	4	(England) Ian Hutchinson	Yamaha	01:13:50.168	122.639
6	8	(England) Gary Johnson	Triumph	01:14:01.201	122.334
7	2	(New Zealand) Bruce Anstey	Honda	01:14:27.969	121.602
8	14	(Isle of Man) Dan Kneen	Honda	01:14:36.632	121.366
9	7	(Isle of Man) Conor Cummins	Honda	01:14:51.743	120.958
10	19	(England) James Cowton	Kawasaki	01:15:02.076	120.680

Senior TT

Position	Number	Rider	Machine	Time	Speed (mph)
1	6	(Northern Ireland) Michael Dunlop	Suzuki	01:09:24.711	130.456
2	10	(England) Peter Hickman	BMW	01:09:38.031	130.040
3	9	(England) Dean Harrison	Kawasaki	01:09:48.216	129.724
4	3	(England) James Hillier	Kawasaki	01:10:11.713	129.000
5	11	(England) Michael Rutter	BMW	01:10:12.357	128.981
6	16	(Australia) Josh Brookes	Norton	01:10:28.793	128.479
7	1	(Australia) David Johnson	Norton	01:10:31.471	128.398
8	7	(Isle of Man) Conor Cummins	Honda	01:10:58.288	127.589
9	18	(England) Martin Jessopp	BMW	01:11:09.747	127.247
10	15	(Northern Ireland) William Dunlop	Yamaha	01:11:10.616	127.221

Sidecar TT 2

Position	Number	Rider & Passenger	Machine	Time	Speed (mph)
1	1	Ben Birchall & Tom Birchall	LCR Honda	58:40.090	115.760
2	3	John Holden & Lee Cain	LCR Honda	59:06.688	114.891
3	4	Conrad Harrison & Andrew Winkle	Honda Rod Bellas	01:01:43.005	110.041
4	26	Lewis Blackstock & Patrick Rosney	Suzuki LCR	01:01:50.080	109.832
5	8	Karl Bennett & Maxime Vasseur	DMR	01:02:21.773	108.901
6	11	Tony Baker & Fiona Baker-Milligan	Suzuki	01:02:32.122	108.601
7	13	Robert Handcock & Ken Edwards	Baker Honda	01:02:38.524	108.416
8	20	Greg Lambert & Julie Canipa	Honda GLR	01:02:39.965	108.374
9	12	Wayne Lockey & Mark Sayers	Ireson Honda	01:02:46.702	108.181
10	10	Gary Knight & Daniel Evanson	Suzuki LCR	01:02:47.422	108.160

== Wins table ==
	Rider	Wins
1	(England) Ian Hutchinson	2
1	(Northern Ireland) Michael Dunlop	2
1	(England) Ben Birchall	2
1	(England) Tom Birchall	2
5	(England) Michael Rutter	1
5	(New Zealand) Bruce Anstey	1

== Bibliography ==
- "Island Racer 2017: Isle of Man TT '17 Racing Guide". Island Racer. Mortons Media Group. 2017. SKU: 3514087 – via Kelsey Publishing.
