= Andalucismo =

Andalucismo may refer to:

- Andalusian nationalism
- The artistic (especially musical) use of Andalusian styles or themes
