= Pottery for oil =

Type of ceramic object

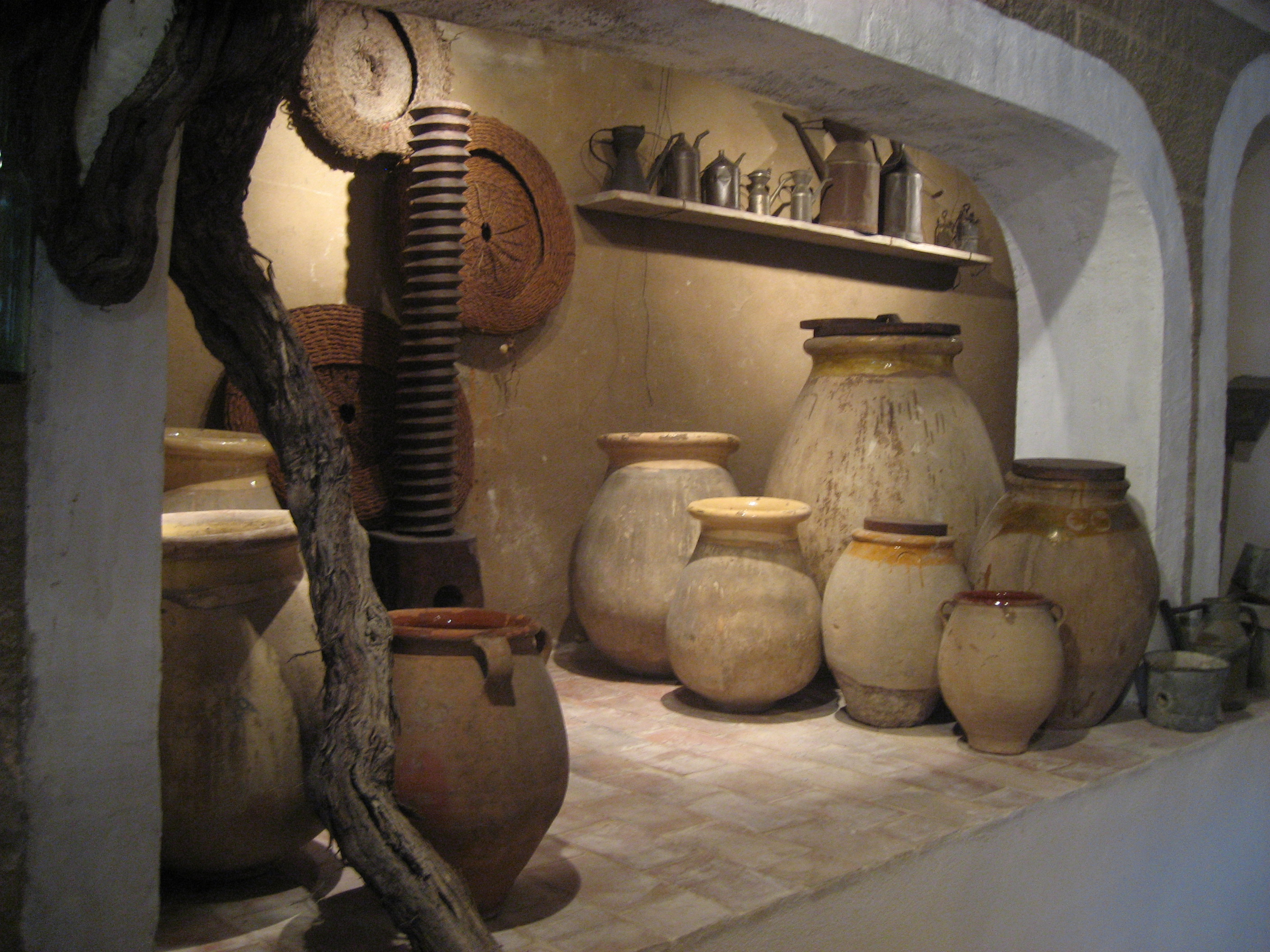
Metal alcuza (top) and oil containers at the Musée du Terroir Marseillais

Pottery for oil is the generic term for ceramic objects, whether coarse or glazed, used for the transportation, storage, and consumption of oily products, particularly olive oil and its culture. (Note: In Mediterranean cuisine, olive oil is a staple for food preservation and a key ingredient in traditional cooking. It is also used in the production of soaps, essences, ointments, massage balms, etc.) Among the most popular items in this category of earthenware are oil cruets and alcuzas, cantarillas, orzas, amphoras, and jars for food. Unguentaries and redomas in ancient pharmacopeia; and lamps and lucernas for lighting. (Note: A comprehensive collection and study of the organization and analysis of the repertoire of containers in this category of pottery were assembled and presented by members of the Equipo Adobe at the "Octavas jornadas de alfarería," held in Avilés (Asturias, Spain) in the spring of 2016. Coordinated by Ricardo Fernández, it also involved Enrique Martínez Glera.)

== History ==
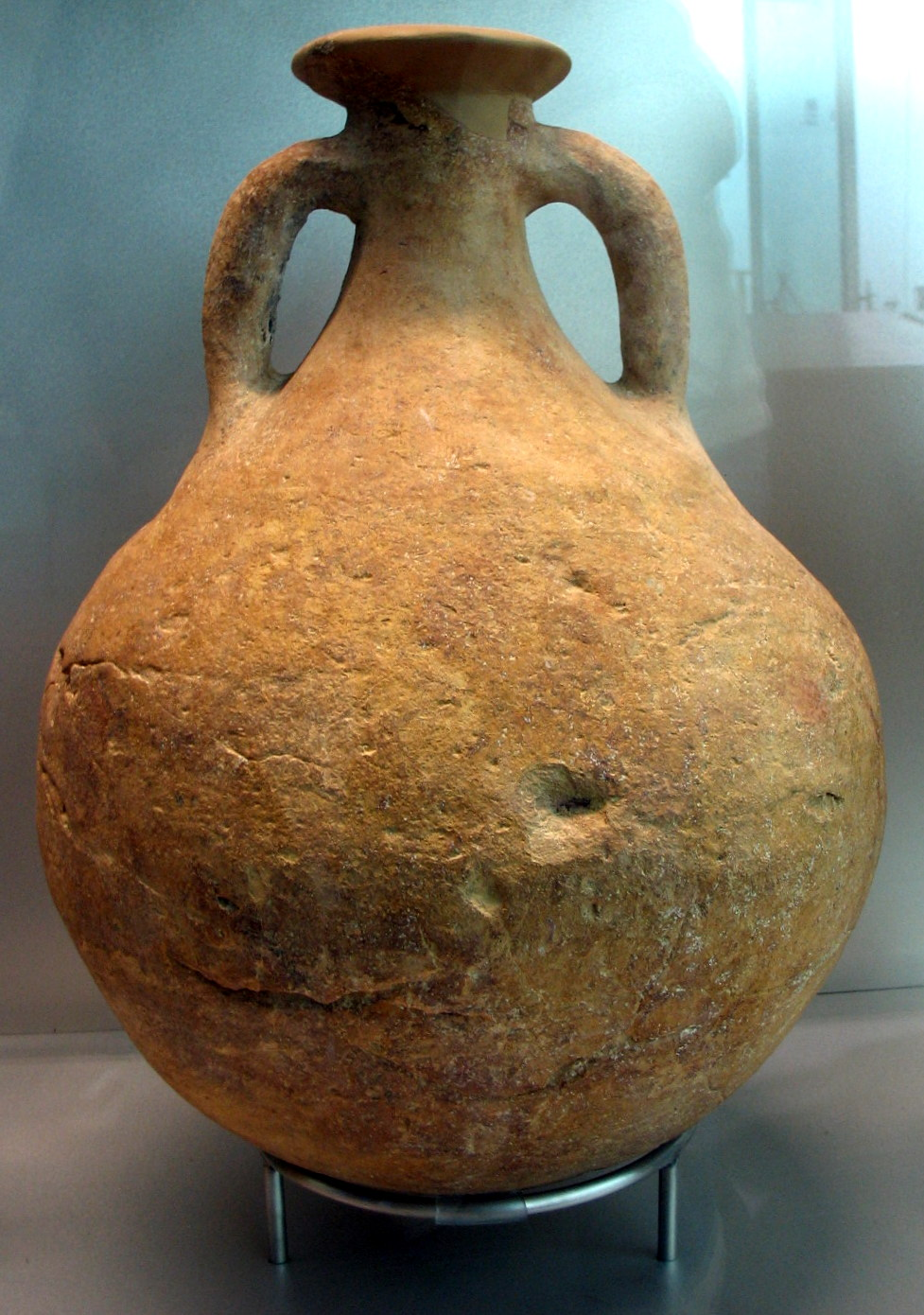
Betic amphora for transporting olive oil, 2nd century CE. Underwater site of Escombreras. National Museum of Underwater Archaeology, Cartagena (Spain).

The binomial pottery-oil is documented to have originated in the ancient Assyrian empire towards the end of the 3rd millennium BCE, in the archaeological digs of the Ebla palace, where thousands of containers capable of storing 120,000 kg of oil were found. There are also written records in cuneiform from the palace's tablet archive, repeatedly mentioning taxes on oil and quality distinctions.

Continuing perhaps from the Hippocratic medicine and information from ancient world historians like Pliny the Elder, a manuscript preserved in the Bibliothèque Nationale de France, the «Tacuinum sanitatis» by the Arab physician Ibn Butlan, compiled in the 15th century, listed remedies and formulations highlighting the essential role of pottery in olive oil culture, both in food and in ointments and balms. The prominence of the so-called Panathenaic amphorae, filled with oil and awarded to victors in games and festivals as containers for balms, is also noted. Greeks, Romans, and Phoenicians shared the pottery-oil association as a basis for their trade. (Note: In the Iberian Peninsula, the Phoenicians introduced this commercial association around 1100 BCE. Later, in Roman Hispania, the use of animal fats like lard decreased, and olive oil, classified into five qualities ("oleum ex albis ulivis," "oleum viride," "oleum maturum," "oleum caducum," and "oleum cibarium"), became a medium of exchange in tribute payments.) Archaeological references are numerous, with the model of the Iberian-Roman city of Lucentum as an example.

== Types of containers and vessels ==
In a basic arrangement or catalog of containers related to the use and consumption of oils, the following can be differentiated:

=== Oil cruets ===
Domestic use containers with varied morphologies that can be summarized in three characteristic elements: prototypes of jugs or cantarillas (with an ovoid body), with one or two handles and a narrow neck. To facilitate pouring, models with occasionally tubular and fine spouts have been developed.

Due to their function and use, oil cruets can be related to the setrill (perhaps of the same root that Nebrija noted for azeytera) from Eastern Spain and the càntir d'oli from Catalonia (or oil pitcher).

=== Alcuzas ===
Researchers seem to agree that the nominal relation to the typology of alcuzas depends more on the traditional designation of the vessel in its place of manufacture and use than on its appearance and form. That is, a container called alcuza in La Mancha is almost identical to another called oil cruet in Aragon, and in turn, they are the same as a Levantine setrill. Similarly, in a documented catalog of both archaeological objects and a museum ceramic collection, two vessels of very different appearance and typology can be seen called setrill, oil cruet, or alcuza. Thus, in this category of domestic containers for storing and serving olive oil, there are oil cruets with spouts like botijos, or Toledo alcuza identical to the Cordoban perulas painted by Julio Romero de Torres.

=== Amphorae ===
Represented in the iconography of Ancient Egypt in the context of pottery and the oil industry, they have been dated on the coasts of Lebanon and Syria, during the 15th century BCE and in the 14th century BCE in the Mycenaean area. Their massive use in wine and oil trade has left countless archaeological references, and from these and later written documents, it is known that these pointed and rounded base containers (designed to be 'fixed' in the sand of beaches during transport and handling) filled the long benches of transport ships. To withstand the hardships and harsh conditions of travel, each container was sealed with a ceramic disk and then with a lime paste. The larger ones, during the period of Roman commercial expansion, could hold about 50 liters of oil.

The oil amphorae from Bética were notable, such as those classified as Dressel 20 amphorae, with specific shapes adapted to different uses, including for storage and transportation, to make them practical for trade.

=== Orzas ===
Typically used in Hispania, orzas have a significant size, with rounded shapes and typically come with two handles. They are almost always made with coarse ceramic, with a thin and smooth exterior surface and a rough, unglazed interior. The oil or other contents were protected by a thin paste applied during firing. In the Iberian Peninsula, orzas are commonly used for storing and transporting oil, and they often have a capacity of 10 to 25 liters.

=== Other containers ===
Domestic use also included containers such as bottles, jugs, and pots for serving and storing oil, which varied in shape and size according to regional customs and periods. These also included unguentaria (for ointments) and lamp vessels like lucernae and candelabra.

== Sources ==
- Caro Bellido, Antonio [in Spanish] (2008). Diccionario de términos cerámicos y de alfarería (in Spanish). Cádiz: Agrija Ediciones. ISBN 978-84-96191-07-5.
- Foxhall, Lin (2007). Olive Cultivation in Ancient Greece: Seeking the Ancient Economy. Oxford University Press. ISBN 9780198152880.
