= Centros Andaluces =

The Centros Andaluces ("Andalusian Centers") were cultural associations that existed throughout Andalusia and in other places in Spain and abroad, dedicated to the creation and promotion of congresses, conferences, publications, expositions, library service, festivals, and in general, all activities related to Andalusian nationalism (Spanish: Andalucismo). The first Centro Andaluz was inaugurated October 22, 1916 in Seville, with a speech by Blas Infante. All of the centers in Spain were closed at the beginning of the dictatorship of Miguel Primo de Rivera in 1923, but some remained open abroad.

The Centros Andaluces published the magazines Bética and Andalucistas, among others.

== See also ==
- Assembly of Ronda
