= Antonio Maeso =

Spanish motorcycle racer

- Born: January 1, 1979; Madrid
- Known for: Motorsport

Antonio Maeso (born 1 January 1979) is a Spanish motorcycling racer who was born in Madrid but moved to live in Almería, Andalusia as a child.

== Career ==
Antonio Maeso's motorcycling career started when he was just four years old and his father bought a small dirt bike for him. Although he started off-road racing very young, it was not until he was 15 that he entered his first road race. He participated in the 50 cc, 80 cc, and 125 cc categories until 2002, winning four county championships. He then moved to Superbikes, racing a Yamaha R1. Twice Spanish winner of the R1 Yamaha Cup, Maeso has also been contesting the National level Superbike championship (called Extreme in Spain).

In 2007, Maeso was a newcomer to the Isle of Man Tourist Trophy races, getting two finishing medals. He competed in the TT races between 2007 and 2017, taking part in 20 races overall, with an overall best of fifth place at the 2017 TT Zero on a University of Nottingham bike. His best result in an internal combustion class was a 17th at the 2009 Senior TT.

== Personal record ==
- height: 173 cm
- weight: 68 kg
- Studies: High Technician of International Trade and Marketing and in Business Management & Marketing, Commercial English Technician.

== List of victories ==
From 1995 to the present, Maeso has achieved victories in all national categories − 50 cc, 80 cc, 125 cc, in the Superbikes Regional Championship, and the Yamaha R1 Spanish Championship. He was the first Spanish (spaniard no, guiris) in more than 30 years to race in the Isle of Man, competing in the TT races there.

=== 2007 ===
- Formula Extreme Spanish Championship

=== 2006 ===
- Formula Extreme Spanish Championship

=== 2005 ===
- Formula Extreme Spanish Championship

=== 2003 ===
- Yamaha R1 Challenge Cup National Final Champion
- Champion of the Andalucía Fam Series Championship (1000c.C.)
- Champion of Challenge Yamaha-Cepsa Andalucía R1

=== 2002 ===
- Champion of the Almería Supermotard Championship
- Champion of the Almería Scooters 50 C.C. Championship

=== 2001 ===
- Champion of the National Final of Yamaha R1 Challenge
- Second Classified of the Fórmula Campeones cat "Motociclismo Superseries"
- Champion of the Andalucía Fam Series Championship (600-1000c.C.)
- Champion of Challenge Yamaha-Cepsa Andalucía R1

=== 2000 ===
- Champion of Challenge Yamaha-Cepsa Andalucía R1
- Champion of Regional of Murcia De 80 C.C Scooters
- Second Classified of Regional De Murcia Automatics 50 C.C.

=== 1998 ===
- Champion of Regional De Murcia 125 C.C. Production
- Second Classified of Trofeo Interautonómico Castilla La Mancha-Murcia 125 C.C. Production

=== 1997 ===
- Champion of the Open 125 C.C. Production
- Champion of the Castilla La Mancha 125 C.C. Production
- Second Classified of the Regional of Murcia 125 C.C. Production
- Second Classified of the Regional of Murcia 250 Gran Prix
- 21 Clas. European Championship 250 Gran Prix

=== 1996 ===
- Champion of the Murcia 125 C.C. Production Championship

=== 1995 ===
- Champion of the Andalucía 125 C.C. Production Championship
