= Davey Lambert =

English motorcycle racer

- Nationality: English
- Born: 1969
- Died: 6 June 2017 (aged 47–48); Aintree, Liverpool, England

David (Davey) Lambert (1969 – 6 June 2017) was an English motorcycle racer. He was from Gateshead.

== Career ==
Lambert had considerable success in the Manx Grand Prix with a fourth place in the Newcomers A race in 2014.

== Death ==
Lambert died of injuries sustained at the Isle of Man TT on 6 June 2017, aged 48. He had come off his 1000cc Kawasaki machine at Greeba Castle. He was making his debut at the race, having previously raced in the Manx Grand Prix with considerable success, including an 8th place in last year's Senior MGP Race. He was airlifted to Noble's Hospital before being transferred to Aintree Hospital in Merseyside.

He became the 253rd rider to be killed on the Snaefell Mountain Course since 1911.
