= Bética =

Cultural magazine in Spain (1914–1917)

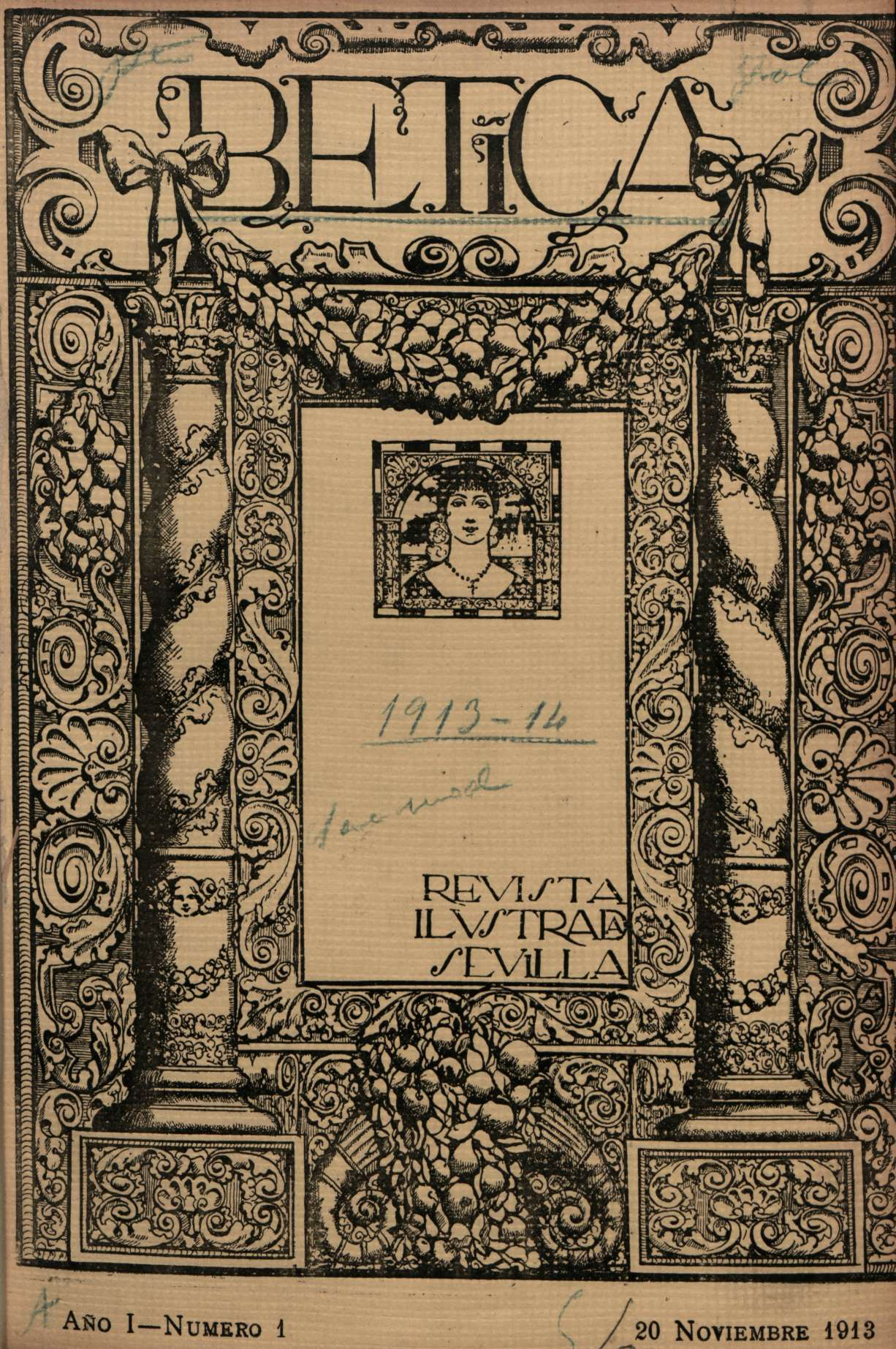
- Categories: Cultural magazine
- Frequency: Biweekly magazine Monthly magazine
- Founded: 1914
- First issue: November 1914
- Final issue: 1917
- Country: Spain
- Based in: Seville
- Language: Spanish

Bética was an illustrated cultural magazine which existed between 1913 and 1917. It was headquartered in Seville, Spain.

== History and profile ==
Bética was launched in Seville in November 1913 as a biweekly magazine. The magazine was affiliated with the Centros Andaluces. Later its frequency was switched to monthly. The magazine covered literary and cultural work and adopted a modernist and art nouveau approach. It also supported regionalism for Andalusia. It folded in 1917.

=== Staff and contributors ===
Félix Sánchez-Blanco was the director of Bética whose deputy was Félix Sánchez-Blanco y Pardo. The poet Felipe Cortines y Murube also served in the magazine. Santiago Martínez y Martín was its chief artistic editor and Javier Lasso de la Vega its chief literary editor. Major contributors included Isidro de las Cagigas, Francisco Rodríguez Marín, Mario Méndez Bejarano, Quintero brothers, Ricardo de León, Salvador Rueda, Gabriel Maura, Armando Palacio Valdés, Francisco Cambó, Joaquín Hazañas, Ángel María Camacho, Joaquín González Verger and Alejandro Guichot.
