= Abd Al Munim Al Gilyani =

7th-century Arabic physician, writer, and poet

- Born: 4th of October, 1136
- Died: 1206
- Occupation(s): Arab physician, Writer, Poet

Abu Al-Fadl Abd Al-Munim bin Omar bin Abdullah Al-Ghassani Al-Gilyani known as Abd Al Munim Al Gilyani(Arabic: عبد المنعم الجلياني). Abd Al Munim Al Gilyani (October 4, 1136 – 1206; Muharram 7, 531 – 603) was an Andalusian Arab physician, writer, and poet from the twelfth century AD / the sixth century AH who lived most of his life in the East. He was given the nickname "The wise man of time" (Arabic: حكيم الزمان) and he is originally from Galiana in Guadix near Granada in Andalusia. He moved to Maghreb then to Mashriq where he lived in Damascus his for the rest of his life. He visited Baghdad in 601 AH. Saladin respected and valued him and Abd al-Moneim praised him, he has 10 collections of both poetry and prose and many other publications. He died in Damascus.

== CV ==
He is Abu Al-Fadl Abdel Munim, and it was said Muhammad Abdel Munim bin Omar bin Abdullah bin Ahmed bin Khader bin Malik bin Hassan Al-Ghassani Al-Malqi Al-Gilyani Al-Wadi Ashi.

He was born on 7th of Muharram 531/4 October 1136 in the village of Galiana in Guadix near Granada. He studied the science of Hadith. He then went to Maghreb then Mashriq then lived in Damascus for a long time. He was connected to Saladin and praised him in many of his poems including a praise in a poetry that he wrote in 538AH and sent it to him where he received it in the same year that he designed the Franks in Acre. Al Gilyani roamed around in the Levant until he became the physician of the Sultani Maristan. He entered Baghdad in 601 AH.

He died in Damascus in the year 603 AH / 1206 at most, or in Dhul-Qi’dah 602 / June 1206.

== Career ==
Al Gilyani was brilliant in medicine, especially in Takheel, clever in mathematics and philosophy, and he worked in the industry of chemistry. In addition, he was a prose writer and poet, and he had a speech in Sufism, and he was known as "The wise man of time" (Arabic: حكيم الزمان).

== Works ==
- He has a number of books, including ten books:
- Diwan of Wisdom and Field of Words (Original title:diwan alhikam wamaydan alkalim): Systems, which includes a reference to every obscure and comprehensible body of knowledge, to every truthful pilgrimage to action, and to every clear path of virtue.
- Diwan of suspense to the higher public. (Original title:diwan almushawiqat 'iilaa almala al'aelaa)
- Diwan Adab Al-Suluk (Original title:diwan 'adab alsuluki): It is an absolute speech that includes the visionary words of wisdom.
- "Anecdotes of Revelation" (Original title: nwadr alwahi): It includes words of absolute wisdom in strange meanings from the Qur’an and hadith.
- "Liberation of sight" (Original title: tahrir alnazari): It includes words of wisdom vocabulary in the speech chapter.
- Diwan of Missionaries and Qudsiyat (Original title: diwan almbshshrat walqdsyat): It is organized, stylized, and absolute speech that includes a description of the ongoing wars and conquests and what is related to them in an orderly fashion.
- Diwan of Ghazal, Tashbeeb, Muwashshahat, Dubit and Related (Original title: diwan alghazal waltashbib walmwshshhat walduwbit wama yttsl biha).
- Diwan of similes, riddles, symbols, descriptions, and injunctions: and various purposes organized.
- Diwan Tarsul and Correspondence in many meanings and varieties of speeches and supplications.
- Diwan of Tadbeej (Original title: diwan altadbij): the temptation of creativity and the height of pleasure
- "Praise be to praise" (Original title: manadih almumadihi).
- "The Kindergarten of Exploits and Pride is one of the Characteristics of Al-Malik Al-Nasir" (Original title: rudat almathir walmafakhir min khasayis almalik alnaasir): Salah Al-Din Al-Ayyubi, written in the year 569 AH.
- "Commentaries on medicine" (Original title: taealiq fi altibi)
- "Attributes of complex drugs" (Original title: safat 'adwiat mrkkb)
- "The Collector of the Patterns of the Questioner in Presentations, Speeches and Messages" (Original title: jamie 'anmat alsaayil fi aleurud walkhutab walrasayili)
- "The Humble Approach to the Immoral People" (Original title: nahj alwadaeat li'ahl alkhalaeati)
