= Flag of Andalusia =

Andalusia
- Use: Civil and state flag
- Proportion: 2:3
- Adopted: 1918 (1982 on state level)
- Use: Civil flag
- Proportion: 2:3

The current flag of Andalusia was adopted in 1918. Blas Infante (1885–1936), the "Father of the Andalusian Fatherland" (Spanish: Padre de la Patria Andaluza), initiated an assembly at Ronda in 1918. This assembly adopted a charter based on the Antequera Constitution (a nationalist Andalusian charter that styled Andalusia as an autonomous republic inside a Spanish federal state; this constitution is known as Constitución Federal de Antequera) and also adopted the current flag of Andalusia and emblem as "national symbols". Its name used to be Arbonaida or also Arbondaira.

The colours of Andalusian flag, green and white, represent hope and peace, as the anthem says:

La bandera blanca y verde
Vuelve tras siglos de guerra
A sembrar paz y esperanza
Bajo el sol de nuestra tierra.

Translation:

The white and green flag
Comes back after centuries of war
To sow peace and hope
Under our land's Sun.

== See also ==
- Emblem of Andalusia
