= Andalusian nationalism =

Ideology and movement in southern Spain

Flag of Andalusia

Andalusian nationalism is the nationalism that asserts that Andalusians are a nation and promotes the cultural unity of Andalusians. In the past it was considered to be represented primarily by the Andalusian Party, (Note: The Andalucista Party was originally known as Partido Socialista de Andalucía or Socialist Party of Andalusia (Not to be confused with the regional branch of Spanish Socialist Workers' Party, known as PSOE-A). It was born out of the Asamblea Socialista of Andalucía but later on it dropped the denomination socialist and veered to the political centre.) but the party disbanded in 2015. In 2021, the left-wing Andalusian nationalist party Adelante Andalucía was formed, obtaining representation in the 2022 regional election.

Some political forces without parliamentary presence like Nación Andaluza and Asamblea Nacional de Andalucía may be found advocating independence. There is also a movement defending the idea that Andalusian is not a dialect of Spanish, but a language of its own.

== Brief history ==
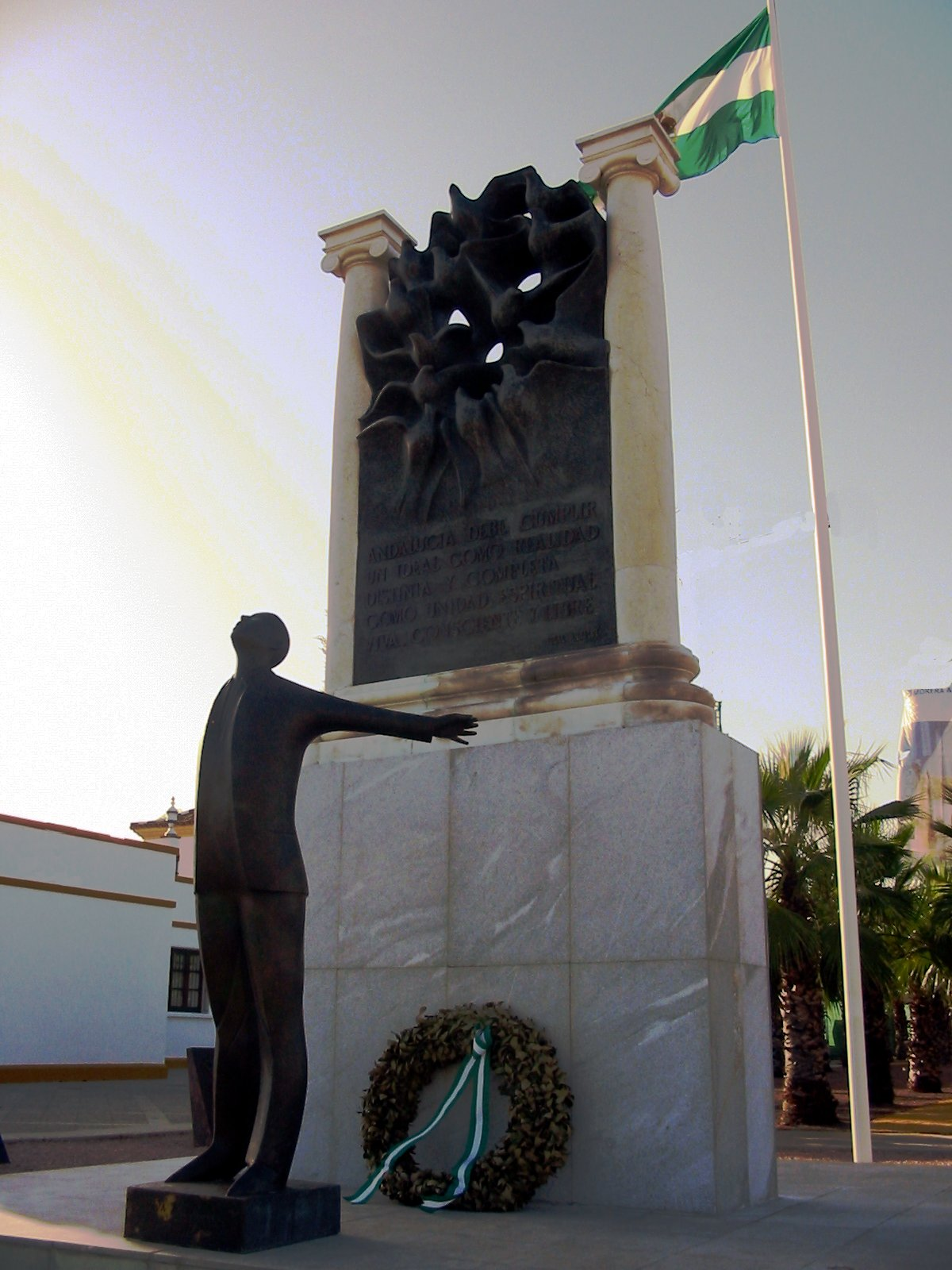
Monument to Blas Infante, Father of Andalusia, erected in the same place where he was executed without trial by Francoist insurgents in 1936.

The predecessor of Andalusian nationalism is the peasant anarchism which was quite active during the 19th century. During the reign of Isabella II of Spain, Andalusia was a hotbed of anarchist insurgency. Later, these anarchist cores became protagonists in conflicts between local people and Madrid.

With the declaration of the First Spanish Republic in 1873, various nationalist currents began to emerge in Andalusia. In 1883, an assembly gathered at Antequera drafted a constitution styling Andalusia as an autonomous republic inside a federal state (República Andaluza o Estado libre o autónomo de Andalucía, in Spanish). This constitution is known as Constitución Federal de Antequera.

Blas Infante, a socialist idealist and founder of modern Andalusian nationalism, (Note: Blas Infante is considered as the Father of the Andalusian Fatherland (Padre de la Patria Andaluza), officially recognised in Law 6/83, passed by the Andalusian Parliament on 13–14 April 1983) initiated an assembly at Ronda in 1918. This assembly adopted a charter based on Antequera Constitution and also adopted the current flag and emblem as "national symbols". During the Second Spanish Republic, the Andalucismo was represented by the Junta Liberalista, a federalist political party led by Infante. As the leading figure of Andalusian nationalism, Infante gave the movement a distinct agrarian socialist character, as he sought to break the power of landowners in Andalusia. While also considered a separatist by some scholars, publicly Infante limited his proposals to the creation of extensively autonomous Andalusia within federal or confederal Spain.

Infante also greatly contributed to the development of Andalusian identity, describing Andalusia as a nation with distinct history and unique identity, and outlined land reform, education reform, identity and patriotism as objectives essential for the regeneration of Andalusia. Infante argued that socioeconomic problems of Andalusia were a direct result of colonial policies implemented by Madrid after the Catholic Reconquest in 1492, resulting in regional degradation and isolation of Andalusia. He also idealized the Al-Andalus era of Andalusia, describing it as the "golden age" of Andalusian history and an important marker of regional identity. However, Infante also defined Andalusians as ethnic Christians and traces Andalusian roots to the pre-Islamic, Christian population. As a left-wing activist, socialist and a republican, Blas Infante was executed by Spanish Nationalists in August 1936, in the beginning of the Spanish Civil War.

Andalusian nationalism was revived when Alianza Socialista de Andalucía or ASA (Socialist Alliance of Andalusia) was founded in 1971, at the last period of Francoism in Spain. Andalusian nationalism drew limited but considerable support from the western part of Andalusia, particularly from provincial capitals like Cádiz and Seville. In recent years, there has been a current arguing that the Andalusian dialect is actually an independent language and not a subset of Spanish.

=== The road to autonomy ===
After dictator Francisco Franco's death, the new Spanish Constitution of 1978 established in its Article 2 the right of "regions and nationalities" (understood as those regions where a language other than Spanish was also spoken) to self-government. This followed a popular outcry in Andalusia for its own right to autonomy, with a total of over a million and a half people demonstrating in the streets of most Andalusian towns and cities on 4 December 1977, while the constitution was still being drafted. This campaign would lead to the inclusion of two articles regarding autonomy in the finished constitution text: Article 143, which would give all Spanish regions the chance to become autonomous communities, with fewer devolved powers; and Article 151, that would set the roles of autonomous communities with a higher degree of autonomy.

Article 151 was automatically applicable to the so-called historic nationalities, which have previously enjoyed autonomy during the Second Spanish Republic, (Note: The Basque Country, Catalonia and Galicia had statutes of autonomy dating back to the Second Spanish Republic.) as reflected in the Spanish Constitution of 1931. Nevertheless, this article also offered the possibility of other regions or nationalities accessing the same level of autonomy if approved on referendum.

A separate statute of autonomy for Andalusia had been written by Blas Infante and submitted, approved by parliament in June 1936, to be voted in referendum in September 1936. However the start of the Civil War in July and the assassination of Infante by Franco's rebels in August of the same year put an end to the autonomist project for Andalusia.

In spite of this, Andalusia was never recognised as a "historic nationality" in the 1978 constitution. This caused a great deal of indignation at the time and fired the fuse of a popular campaign which would lead the region seeking autonomy under the vía rápida (fast route) proposed for the historic nationalities by article 151 of the Spanish constitution. The "fast route" required an approved referendum by an absolute majority of all eligible voters in the region as well as in each constituent province. The referendum vote on 28 February 1980 did succeed in gaining the absolute majority of eligible voters in the proposed region, and in all provinces except for Almería, where it fell just short of a majority of all "eligible voters". Due to this, Andalusia could not achieve autonomous status under the "fast route" proposed by the Spanish constitution.

In response to this situation, where a clear majority of voters wished for autonomy to be granted to the region but fell short of the actual requirements of the chosen autonomy process, the Spanish Congress of Deputies passed "Ley 13/1980" allowing for the substitution of the approval by the deputies and senators of Almeria province instead the required approval of an absolute majority of the voters of the province. The new Statute of Autonomy was approved by the Spanish parliament in 1981 under the requirements of article 151.

A proposal for the reform of the Statute of Autonomy for Andalusia was finalised by the Andalusian Parliament in May 2006. After being debated and posteriorly approved in the Spanish Parliament, the original wording of the statute was amended to define Andalusia as a "Nacionalidad" (Historic Nationality). This has led to severe criticism by the Andalusist Party and other political forces for falling short of the steps taken in the 2006 Statute of Autonomy of Catalonia, where this territory defined itself as a Nation.

The amended text was approved by both the Senate of Spain and the Congress of Deputies of Spain and was voted in referendum on February 18, 2007.

A survey conducted by the Andalusian Center for Studies Foundation in 2025 revealed that, on a scale of 0 to 10, between feeling “not at all Andalusian” and “very Andalusian,” Andalusian identity averaged 8.47. For Spain as a whole, the average was 8.57. Around 78% of Andalusians stated thay they felt identified or very identified with the Spanish flag, and another 73.6% with the Spanish national anthem. Around 83.7% of Andalusians stated they were “very” or “quite proud” to be Spanish, and 59.3% stated they also felt “as Andalusian as they are Spanish".

== Gallery ==
Andalusian flag, designed by Blas Infante

Left nationalist and pro-independence flag, used by Nación Andaluza and other groups

Another nationalist flag using traditional Tartessos 8-point star

Flag of the Andalucista Youth (Andalusian Party youth wing)

== See also ==
- Autonomous communities of Spain
- Andalusist Party
- Andalusian language movement
- Nationalities in Spain
- Andalusian Liberation
- Unitarian Candidacy of Workers
