= Blas Infante =

Andalusian politician (1885–1936)

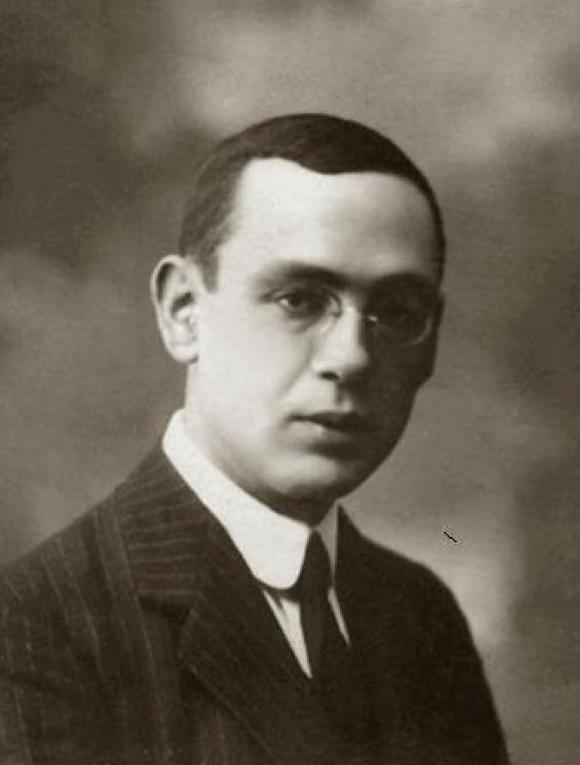
- Blas Infante, c. 1914
- Born: Blas Infante Pérez de Vargas; 5 July 1885; Casares, Málaga, Spain
- Died: 11 August 1936 (aged 51); Seville, Spain
- Cause of death: Execution by firing squad
- Education: University of Granada
- Occupations: Notary, writer
- Political party: Federal Democratic Republican Party

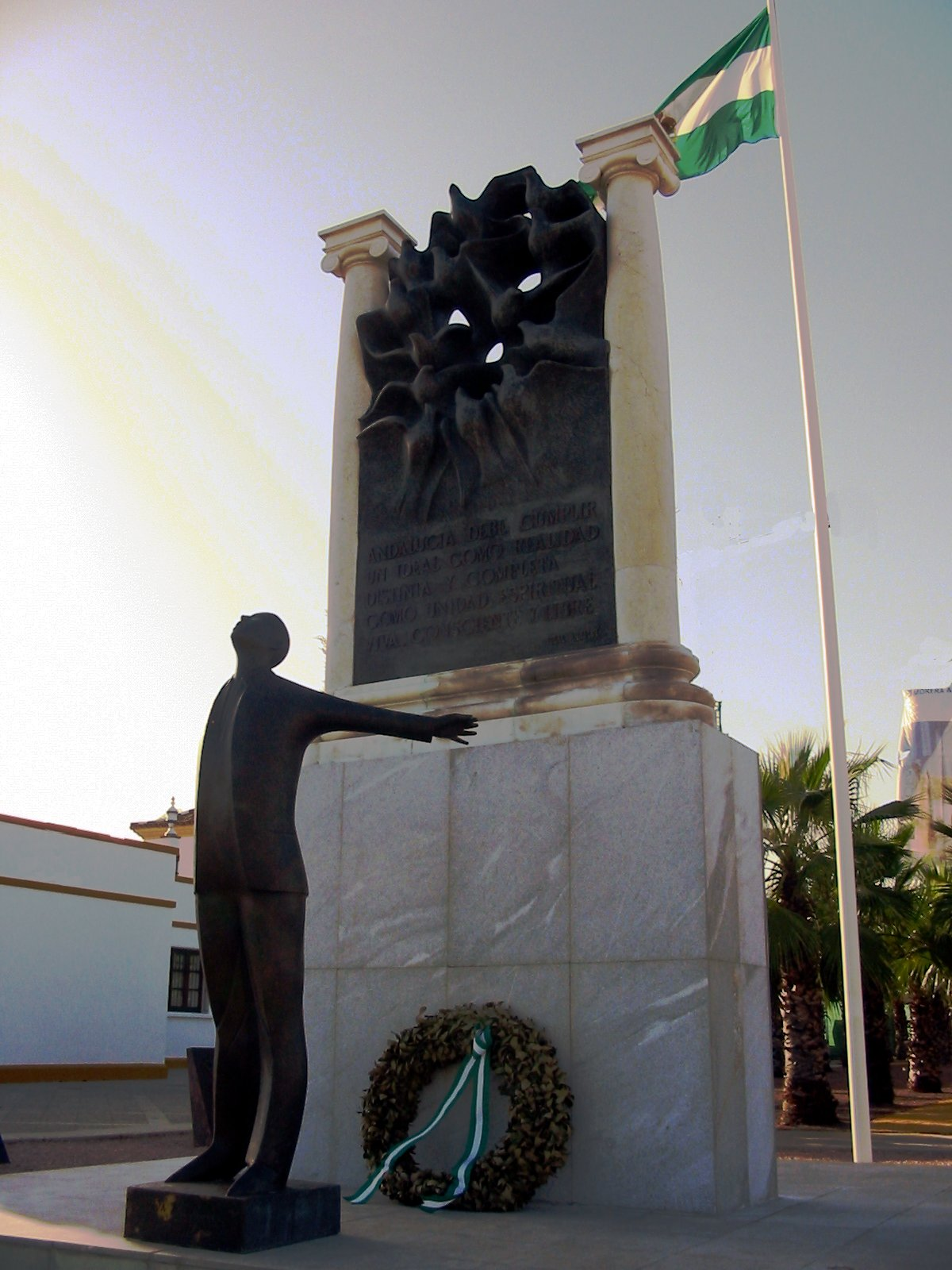
Monument to Blas Infante, Father of Andalusia, erected in the location where he was executed without trial by rebels in 1936.

Blas Infante Pérez de Vargas (5 July 1885 – 11 August 1936) was an Andalusian socialist politician, Georgist, writer, historian and musicologist. He is considered the "father of Andalusia" by Andalusian nationalists.

He initiated an Andalusian regionalist assembly in Ronda in 1918; the assembly adopted a charter based on the autonomist Constitución Federal de Antequera written in 1883 during the First Spanish Republic. It also embraced the current flag and emblem as national symbols, designed by Infante himself based on various historic Andalusian standards. During the Second Spanish Republic, the Andalucismo was represented by the Junta Liberalista, a federalist political party led by Infante.

Infante was among numerous political figures who were summarily executed by Franco's forces when they took over Seville at the beginning of the Spanish Civil War. As a regional autonomist, left-wing activist and an avowed socialist, he twice "merited" inclusion on their liquidation list.

His last residence in Coria del Río now hosts the Museum of Andalusian Autonomy.

== Youth and education ==
He was born on 5 July 1885 in Casares. He was the son of Luis Infante Andrades and Ginesa Pérez Romo. According to the writer José Luis Ortiz de Lanzagorta, his father was a farmer. Although the grandfather's name in the civil registry is Ignacio Pérez y Salas, he was familiarly known as Ignacio Pérez de Vargas. In 1896 he began studying at the Escuelas Pías de Archidona. He then studied at the Provincial Secondary Education Institute and the College of the Piarists. In 1898 he was forced to abandon his plans to attend university and work as a clerk at the municipal courpreparatory ather. Eventually in 1904 he began the preparatory course for Law at the Faculty of Philosophy at the University of Granada, and in 1905 he began at the Faculty of Law at the university. He mostly studied independently, only occasionally showing up in classes, but still graduated in 1906, and in 1909 he passed the exam to become a notary. He settled in Cantillana but frequently visited Seville.

== Georgism ==
Blas Infante met the agricultural engineers Antonio Albendín Orejón and Juan Sánchez Mejía in Cantillana. Albendín, who lived in Ronda, was one of the introducers to Spain of the physiocratic ideas of the American Henry George, including a single land tax. He directed the magazine El impuesto único (The Single Tax), published between 1911 and 1923, which advocated for Georgist ideas.

== Politics ==
In 1913 Catalan nationalist Francesc Cambó came to Seville to give a speech. While visiting, he offered financial assistance to Blas Infante to start an Andalusian newspaper, but because there were strings attached, Infante refused. On several other occasions he refused offers to work with Catalan nationalists.

In 1915 he published one of his main works - Ideal Andaluz - which described Andalusian identity as a hybrid of Spanish and Morisco identity. In it he used Andalusia of an example of cultural fusion that was expected to occur more in the future. He framed the reconquista as a catastrophe that ended a bright period of cultural splendor.

Infante described himself as a socialist, and had staunchly left-wing beliefs, combined with regionalism and nationalism. His views are also considered an example of agrarian socialism, given Infante's emphasis on the need to free the Andalusian countryside from landowners.

While some scholars such as González de Molina and Sevilla Guzmán described Infante as a separatist, publicly Infante limited his proposals to the creation of extensively autonomous Andalusia within federal or confederal Spain. On 16 June 1917, he gave a speech at the Andalusian Center in Seville where he advocated for a federal republic style of government.

Infante greatly contributed to the development of Andalusian identity, describing Andalusia as a nation with distinct history and unique identity, and outlined land reform, education reform, identity and patriotism as objectives essential for the regeneration of Andalusia. Infante argued that socioeconomic problems of Andalusia were a direct result of colonial policies implemented by Madrid after the Catholic Reconquest in 1492, resulting in regional degradation and isolation of Andalusia. He also idealized the Al-Andalus era of Andalusia, describing it as the "golden age" of Andalusian history and an important marker of regional identity.

However, Infante also defined Andalusians as ethnic Christians and traces Andalusian roots to the pro-Islamic, Christian population. As a left-wing activist, socialist and a republican, Blas Infante was executed by Spanish Nationalists in August 1936, in the beginning of the Spanish Civil War. His ideas contrasted sharply with the fascist Francoists who sought to repress the traces Andalusia's Islamic past.

Francoists claimed that he used the radio in his house to communicate with Communists, but in reality it was just a regular receiving radio.

=== Research on Andalusian culture ===
He frequently emphasized that Andalusia had far more Arab influence than the rest of Spain. He wrote about Arab influence on the famous Spanish Flamenco dance. The Moriscos who fled to the mountains of Andalusia and were protected by Spanish Roma as fellow outcasts, who then picked up elements of Morisco music and dance, which then became adopted by the Spanish.

== Death ==
Blas Infante was shot by Francoists on the morning of 11 August 1936 at kilometer 4 of the highway from Seville to Carmona. His body was likely buried in the Pico Reja mass grave.

== Religious beliefs ==
From a spiritual standpoint, Blas Infante was a mere eclectic, with deep humanitarianist and masonic pantheist convictions.

Some milieus (including Spanish right-wing elements and Morisco-descendent communities in Morocco) persistently attribute Blas Infante an alleged conversion to Islam in 1924 in Aghmat. The conversion claim has suggested to be a case of fascists trying to discredit him and the idea of Andalusian nationalism, and right-wingers often bring up the allegation of his conversion to discredit him. His family told the press that he was an admirer of Saint Teresa and Saint John of the Cross and donated to the Dominican convent in Seville. Spanish historian Enrique Iniesta counted mentions of 36 saints and 175 theologians (orthodox and heterodox) in his unpublished writings.

== Islamophilia ==
Infante was fascinated by Islam and sympathetic to Muslims of North Africa and glorified the Muslim history of Andalusia. He viewed the influence of Islam in Andalusia as contrary with the Europeanization of Spain, and referred to the exiled Moriscos as brothers. His wedding ring had inscription in Arabic.

== Legacy ==
While Infante's ideas do not have broad support in modern Andalusia and his work is relatively obscure, he remained revered by Andalusian nationalists as a martyr who view him as the "father of the Andalusian nation" which the Andalusian regional parliament officially proclaimed him in 2010. However, Andalusian nationalism is not nearly as popular as Catalan nationalism.

The Blas Infante Foundation regularly holds events celebrating his memory and promoting his works.

== In popular culture ==
The 2003 film Una pasión singular by Antonio Gonzalo features the life of Blas Infante.

The 2025 podcast Lost Bones: the Vanished Remains of Blas Infante by In Search of Lost Crime focuses on the death of Blas Infante and the search for his remains in the Pico Reja mass grave in Sevilla.

== Published works ==
- Ideal Andaluz (in Spanish). 1915 – via Wikisource.
- La Obra de Costa (1916)
- La Sociedad de Naciones (with J. Andrés Vázquez, 1917)
- Manifiesto Andalucista de Córdoba de 1919 (in Spanish). 1919 – via Wikisource.
- Motamid, último rey de Sevilla (1920)
- Cuentos de Animales (1921)
- Los Mandamientos de Dios a favor de los animales (1921)
- La Dictadura pedagógica (1921)
- Reelección Fundamental – Primer Volumen – La Religión y la Moral (1921)
- Orígenes de lo flamenco y secreto del cante jondo (1929–31)
- La verdad sobre el complot de Tablada y el Estado libre de Andalucía (1931)
- Cartas Andalucistas de Septiembre de 1935 (1935)
- Manifiesto a todos los andaluces (1936)

== Unpublished works ==
- Fundamentos de Andalucía – 1ª serie de Cartas Andalucistas (unpublished, 1929)
- El Libro Nuevo (unpublished)
- Almanzor (unpublished)

== Literature ==
- Carmona Portillo, Antonio (1999). Historia de Andalucía. Andalucía 2000. Málaga: Ed. Sarriá. ISBN 978-84-95129-21-5.
- Iniesta Coullaut-Valera, Enrique (2007). Blas Infante: toda su verdad; 1931 - 1936. Colección Andalucía. Córdoba: Almuzara. ISBN 978-84-96710-24-5.
- Lacomba, Juan Antonio (1983). Blas Infante. La forja de un ideal andaluz (in Spanish). Fundación Blas Infante. ISBN 84-398-0100-9.
- Lacomba, Juan Antonio (2000). Blas Infante y el despliegue del andalucismo (in Spanish). Sarriá. ISBN 84-95129-21-3.
- Ruiz Romero, Manuel (2010). Blas Infante Pérez (1885-1936) (in Spanish). Centro de Estudios Andaluces. ISBN 9788493785574.
- Lanzagorta, José Luis Ortiz de (1979). Blas Infante: vida y muerte de un hombre andaluz (in Spanish). Edición Fernández-Narbona. ISBN 978-84-300-0856-8.
- Resina, Joan Ramon (2013-01-01). Iberian Modalities: A Relational Approach to the Study of Culture in the Iberian Peninsula. Liverpool University Press. ISBN 978-1-84631-833-7.
