= Vega de Granada =

Coordinates: 37°11′15″N 3°36′39″W

- Comarca
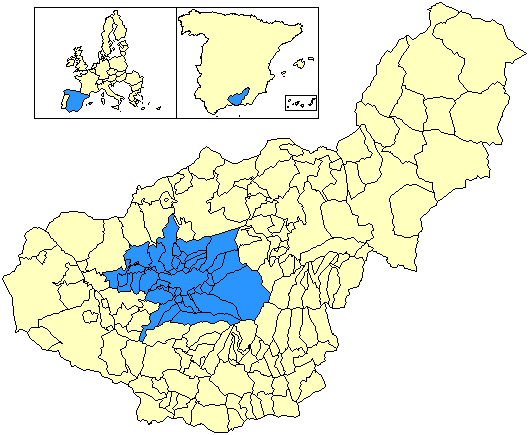
- Location of Vega de Granada in the province of Granada.
- Country: Spain
- Autonomous community: Andalusia
- Province: Granada
- Capital: Granada

Area
  - Total: 1,362.22 km^{2} (525.96 sq mi)

Population (2024) (Note: Estimate at 1 January 2024: National Statistics Institute (Spain))
  - Total: 565,818
  - Density: 415.365/km^{2} (1,075.79/sq mi)
- Time zone: UTC+1 (CET)
  - Summer (DST): UTC+2 (CEST)

The Vega de Granada is a comarca (county, but with no administrative role) in the province of Granada, in Andalusia, Spain. The name refers to the basin near the city of Granada.

This comarca was established in 2003 by the Government of Andalusia.

== Geography ==
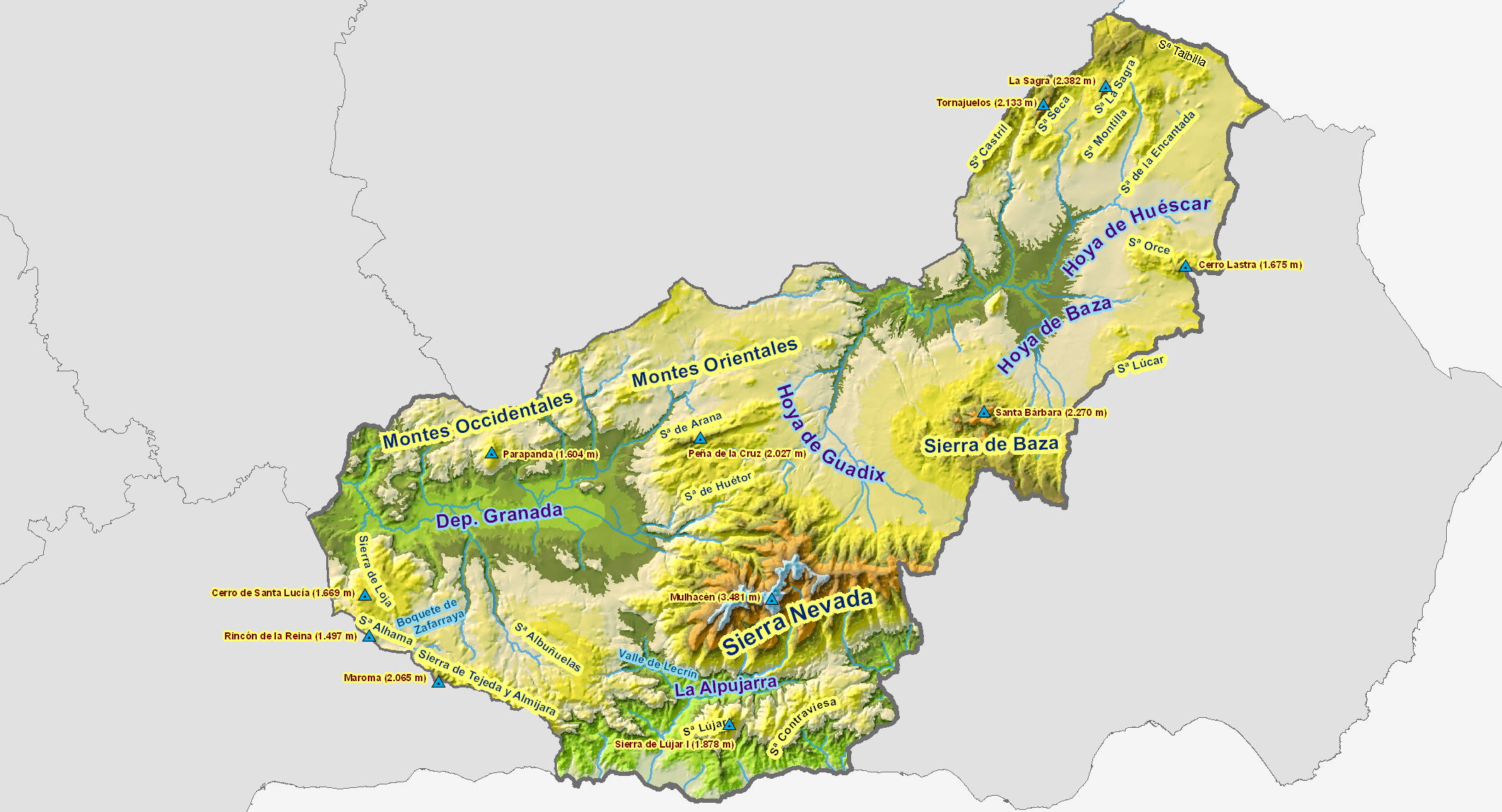
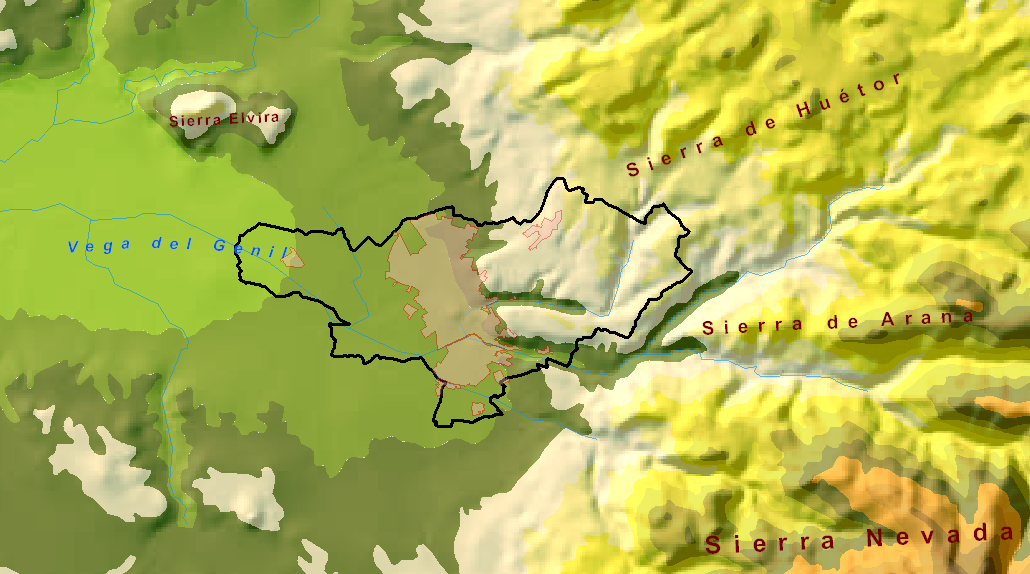
Topographic map of Granada province. Vega de Granada spreads over the eastern area of the depression of Granada and Baetic System mountain ranges of Sierra Nevada (Up). The municipality of Granada is located where both of these geographic landmarks meet (Down)

The Vega de Granada comarca is located in the central part of the province, at the eastern area of the depression of Granada and the neighbouring mountain ranges of Sierra Nevada, Sierra de Huétor and Sierra de la Alfaguara. It shares borders with the comarcas of Los Montes to the north, Guadix to the east, Alpujarra Granadina to the southeast, Valle de Lecrín to the south, Alhama to the southwest and Loja to the west.

== Municipalities ==
The comarca contains the following 41 municipalities:

Arms	Municipality	Area (km2)	Population (2024) (Note: Estimate at 1 January 2024: National Statistics Institute (Spain))	Density (/km^{2})
	Albolote	78.6	19,587	249.2
	Alfacar	16.7	5,784	346.3
	Alhendín	50.8	10,399	204.7
	Armilla	4.3	25,405	5,908.1
	Atarfe	47.3	20,455	432.5
	Beas de Granada	23.2	1,009	43.5
	Cájar	1.7	5,492	3,230.6
	Calicasas	11.2	658	58.8
	Cenes de la Vega	6.5	8,296	1,276.3
	Chauchina	21.2	5,781	272.7
	Churriana de la Vega	6.6	16,693	2,529.2
	Cijuela	17.9	3,714	207.5
	Cogollos Vega	49.8	2,084	41.8
	Cúllar Vega	4.4	7,809	1,774.8
	Dílar	79.3	2,319	29.2
	Dúdar	8.4	373	44.4
	Fuente Vaqueros	16.0	4,625	289.1
	Las Gabias	39.0	23,318	597.9
	Gójar	12.0	6,340	528.3
	Granada	88.0	232,717	2,644.5
	Güéjar Sierra	239.0	2,926	12.2
	Güevéjar	9.8	2,660	271.4
	Huétor Santillán	93.3	1,938	20.8
	Huétor Vega	4.2	12,294	2,899.5
	Jun	3.7	4,145	1,120.3
	Láchar	13.1	3,826	292.1
	Maracena	4.9	22,310	4,553.1
	Monachil	88.9	8,608	96.8
	Nívar	11.2	1,069	95.4
	Ogíjares	6.9	15,063	2,183.0
	Peligros	10.1	11,674	1,155.8
	Pinos Genil	14.0	1,638	117.0
	Pinos Puente	92.9	9.708	104.5
	Pulianas	6.3	5,628	893.3
	Quéntar	66.5	943	14.2
	Santa Fe	38.2	15,269	399.7
	Valderrubio	5.5	2,077	377.6
	Vegas del Genil	14.2	12,325	868.0
	Villa de Otura	24.3	7,606	313.0
	Víznar	13.0	997	76.7
	La Zubia	20.1	20,056	997.8
	Total	1363.0	565,818	415.1

== Gallery ==
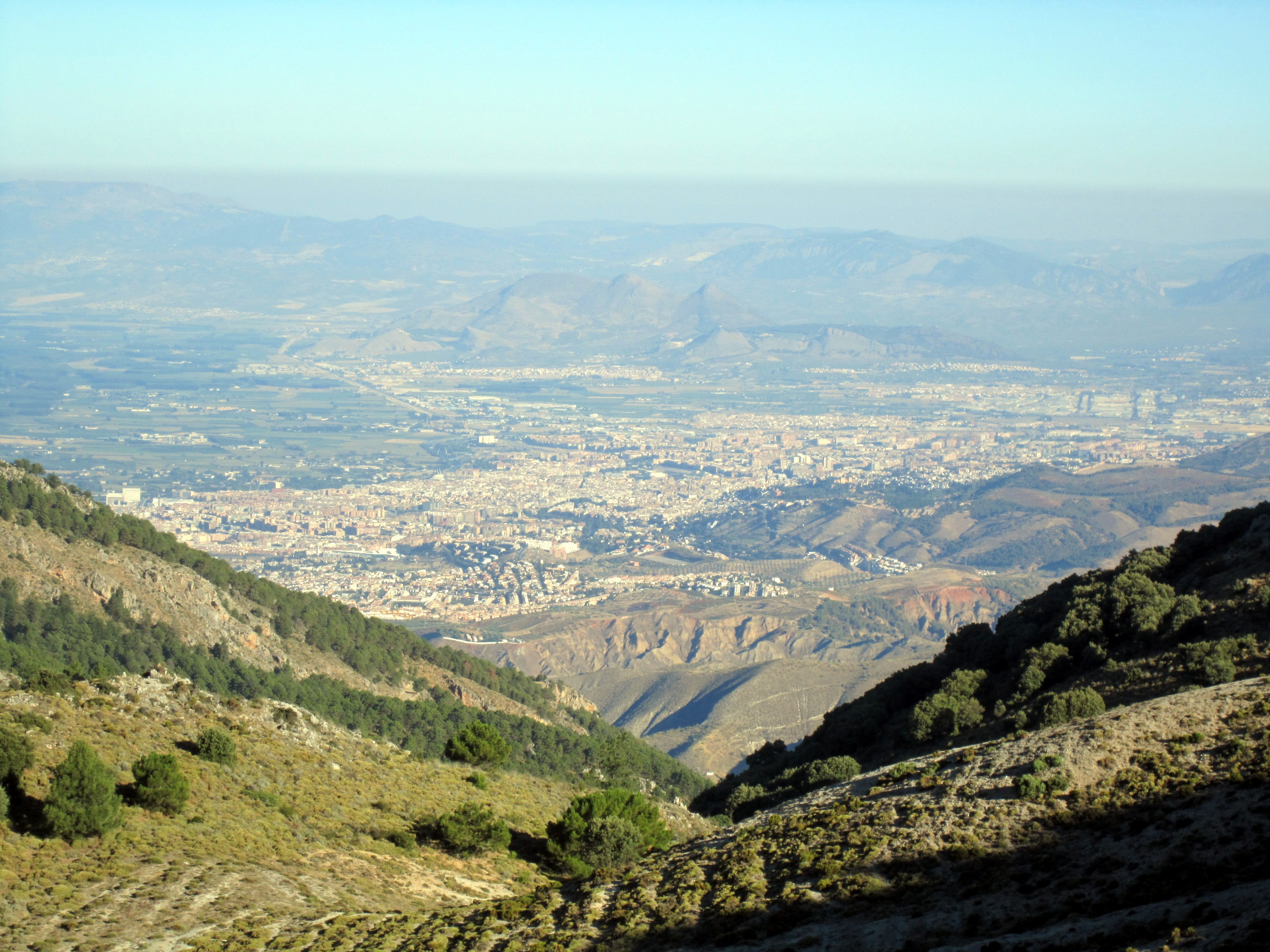
View of Granada city from the southeast

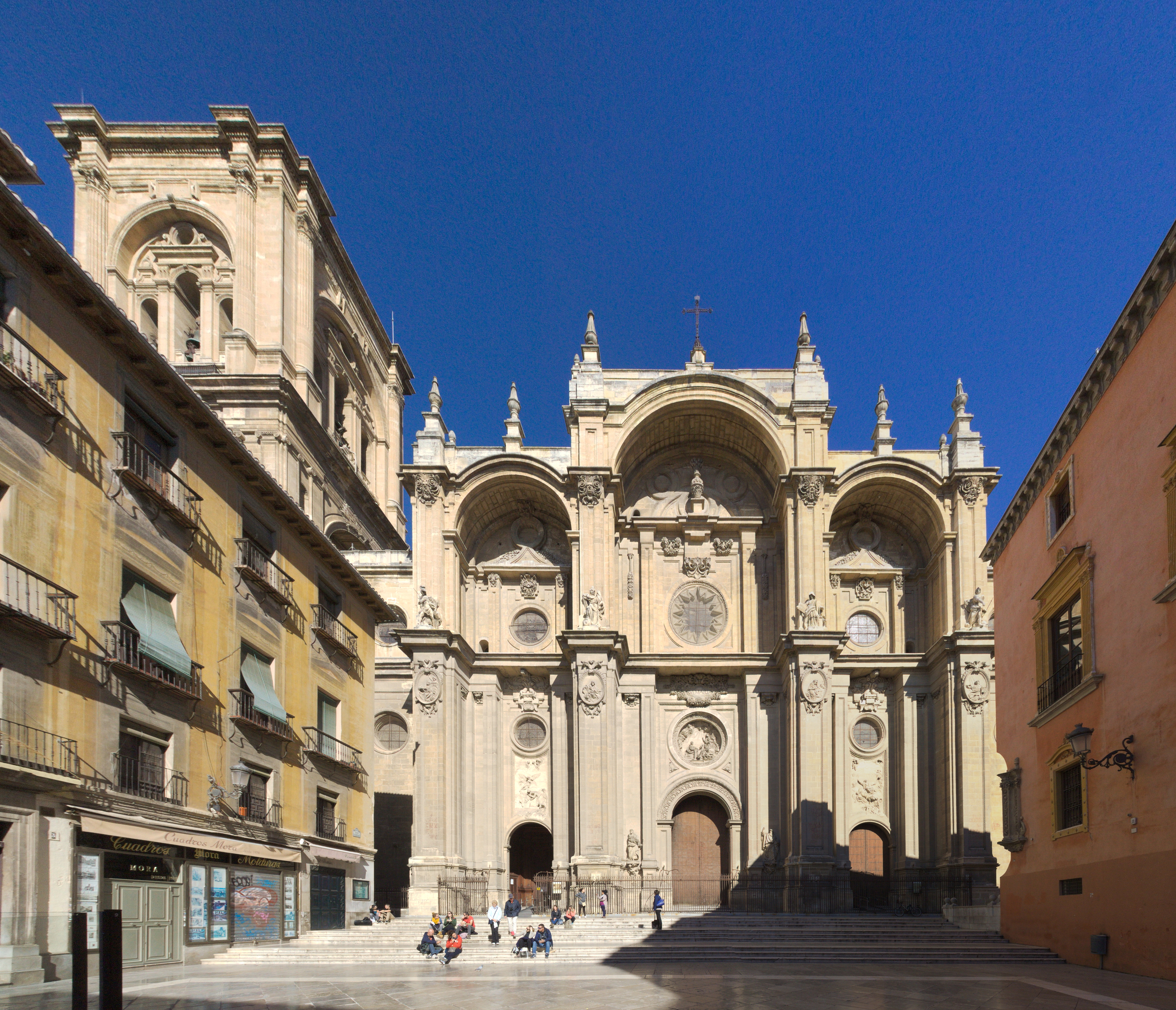
Granada Cathedral

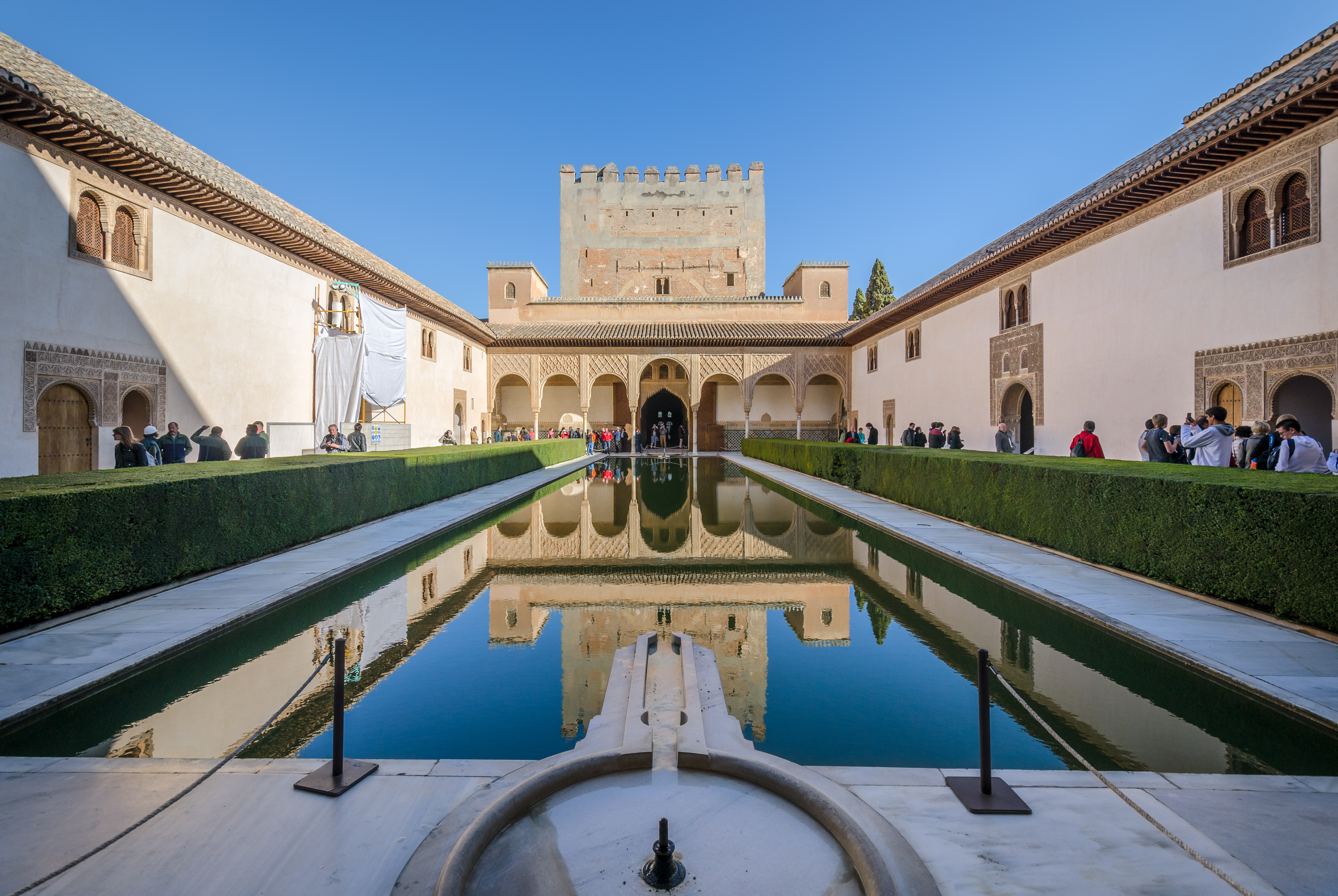
Court of the Myrtles in the Alhambra

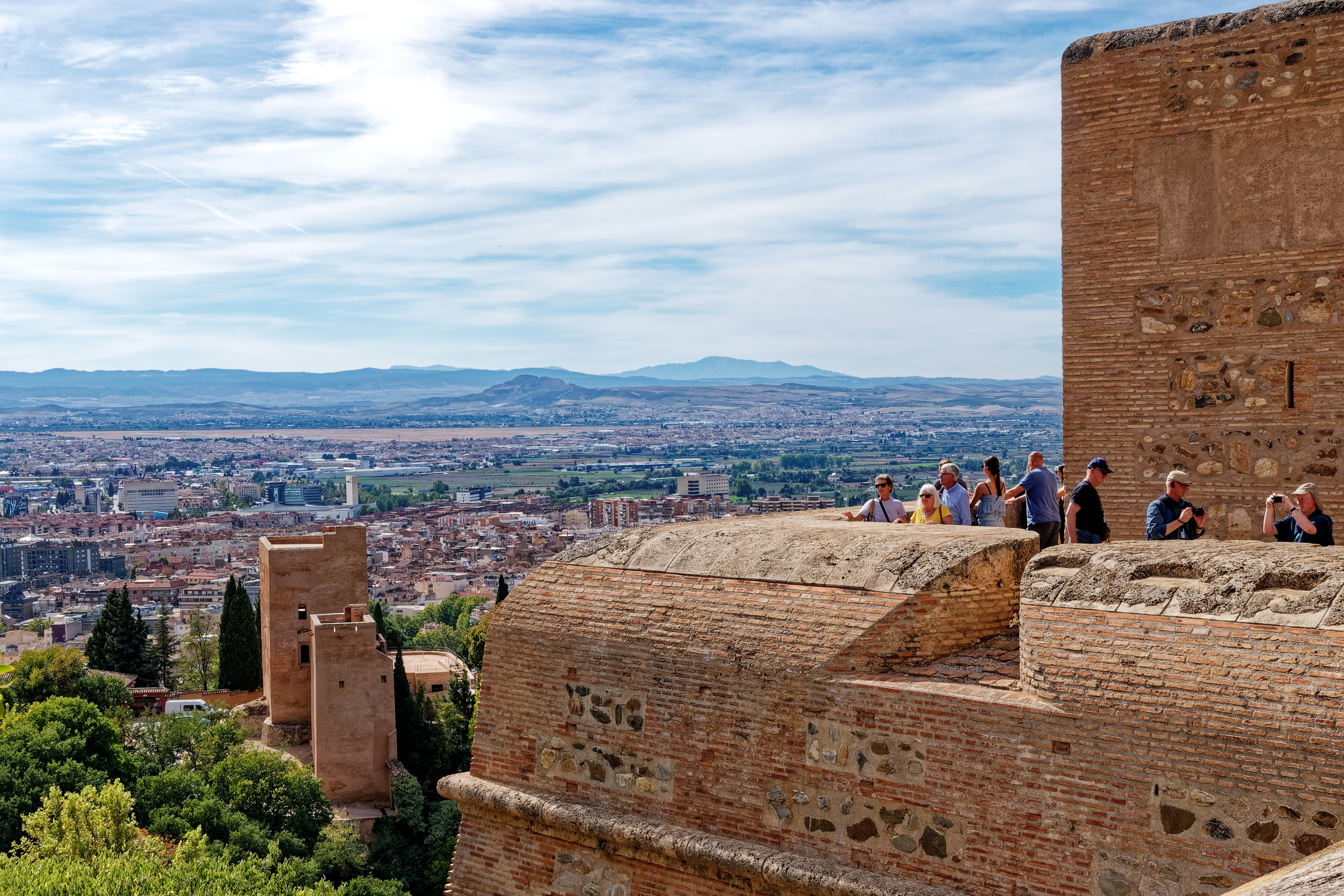
View of Granada from the Alhambra

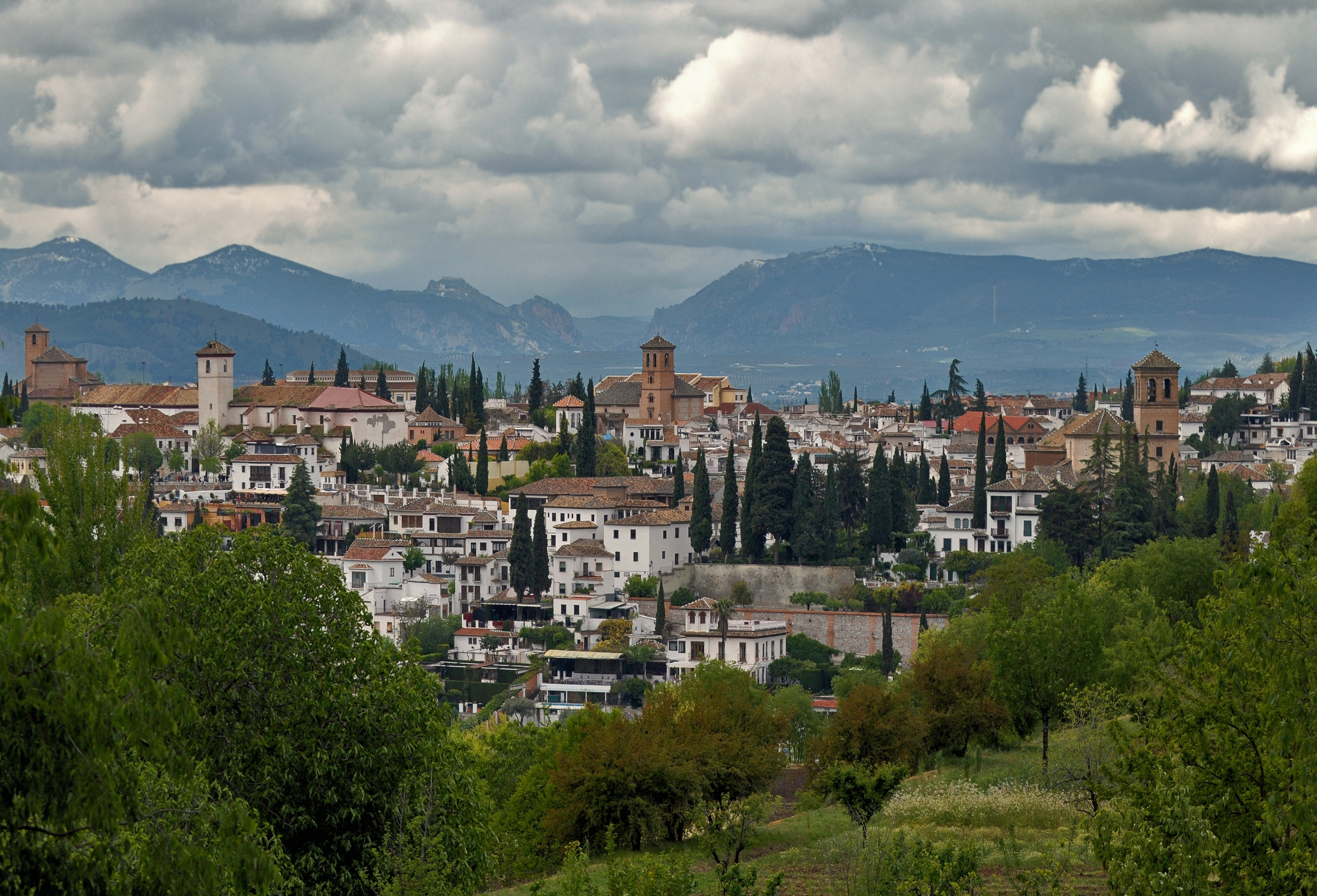
View of Albaicín neighbourhood

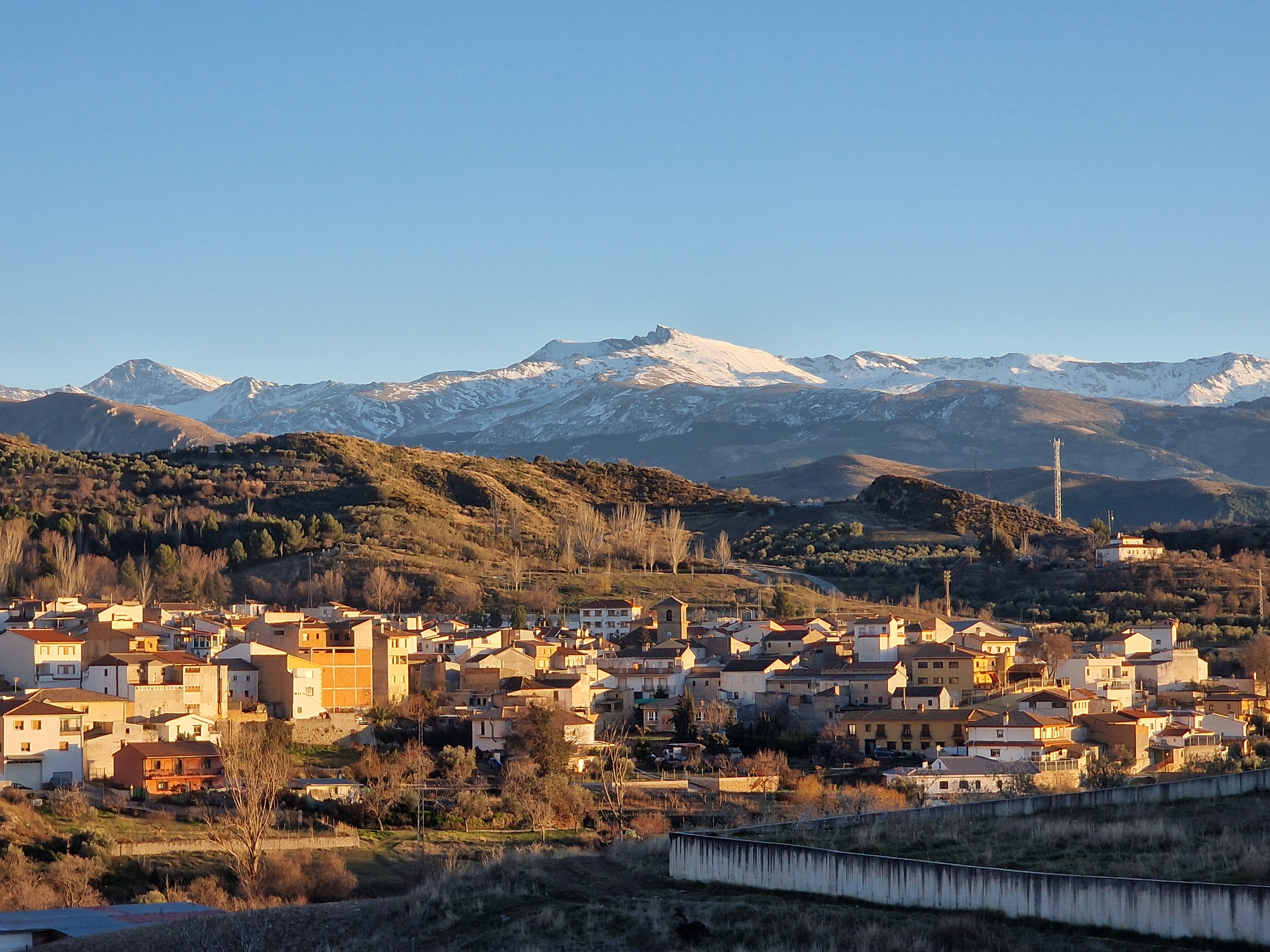
View of Beas de Granada and Sierra Nevada in the background
