= Cogollos Vega =

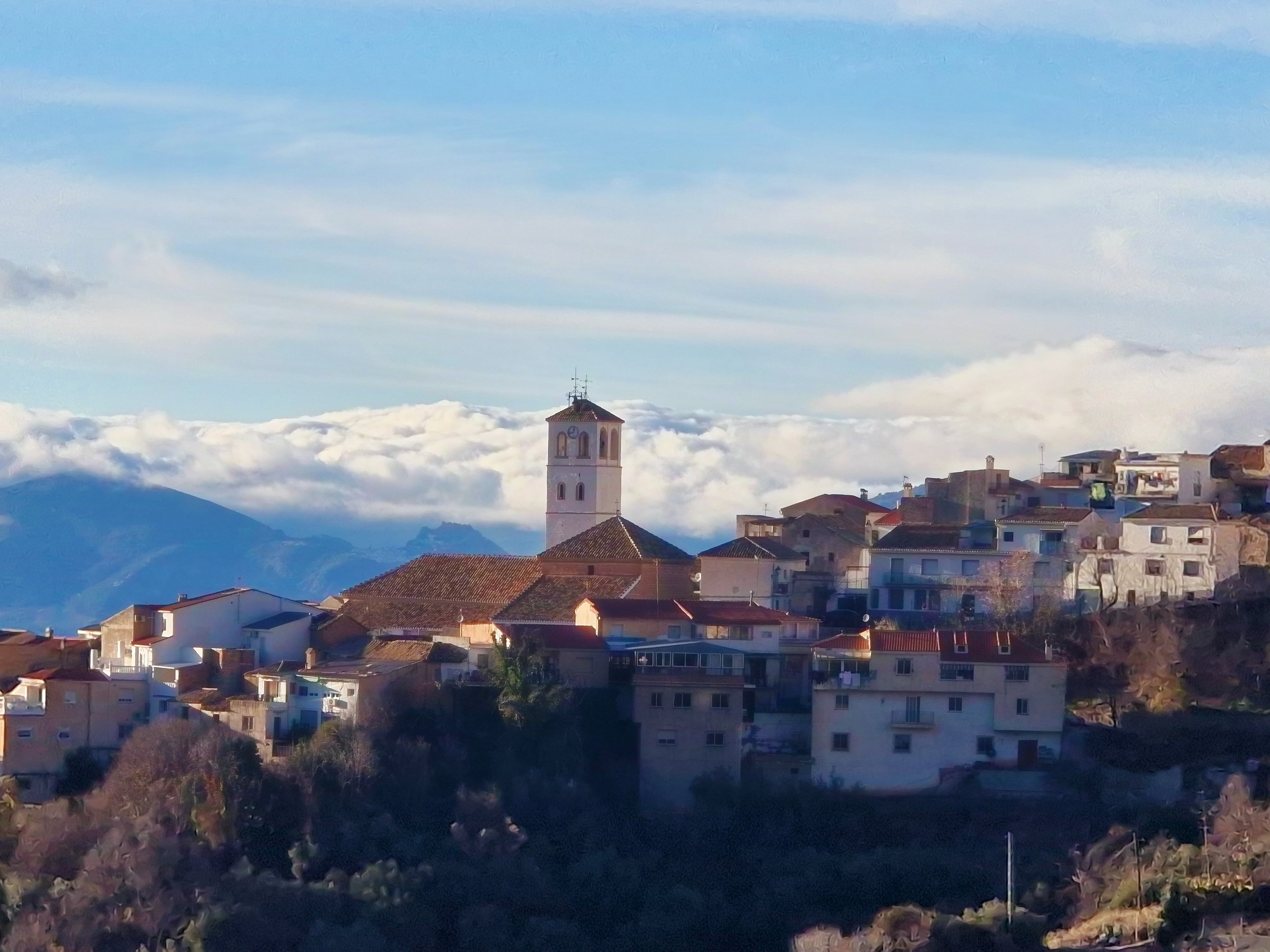
- Cogollos Vega

- Coat of arms

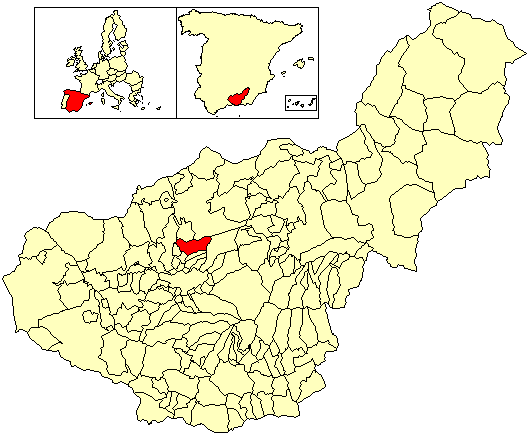
- Coordinates: 37°16′29″N 3°34′23″W
- Country: Spain
- Province: Granada
- Municipality: Cogollos Vega

Area
  - Total: 49.87 km^{2} (19.25 sq mi)
- Elevation: 1,009 m (3,310 ft)

Population (2025-01-01)
  - Total: 2,119
  - Density: 42.49/km^{2} (110.0/sq mi)
- Postal code: 18211
- Website: www.cogollosvega.es

Cogollos Vega is a municipality in the province of Granada, Spain, located at the feet of the Sierra de Cogollos. As of 2010, it had a population of 2068 inhabitants. It is Located in the northern part of the province, about 14 km from the provincial capital, Granada. It borders the municipalities of Deifontes, Iznalloz, Huétor Santillán, Nívar, Güevéjar, Calicasas and Albolote.

== History ==
There are traces which show there was settlement here during the Palaeolithic era. Remains have been found of Romans and Visigoths, as well as Arabs. The Village of Cogollos Vega was assigned to the district of Vega with Alhendín, Alfacar, Víznar and other population centres. It is mentioned by Ibn al-Khatib. The records of their existence do not date before the fourteenth century. It was occupied by Moors until they were expelled in 1572, and lay deserted until eight years later. Then arrived eighty settlers, mostly from the town of Jaen Huelma.

According to the Cadastre of Ensenada, in 1752, it had 259 residents.

The rest of its history is closely linked to that of Granada, given its proximity and its location halfway between Grenada and the foothills of the Natural Park of Sierra de Huétor, Part of the Baetic System. There are masses of oak, and magnificent scenery.

== Politics ==
Cogollos Vega results in the municipal elections held in May 2011 were:

Municipal Elections - Cogollos Vega (2011)
Political Party	Votes	% of Votes	Seats
Partido Popular (PP)	636	45,43%	6
Grupo Independiente de Cogollos Vega (GIC)	331	23,64%	3
Unión Demócrata de Cogollos (UDC)	205	14,64%	1
Partido Socialista Obrero Español (PSOE)	111	7,93%	1

== Events & Attractions ==
=== Events ===
==== Easter ====
- Several religious services are held.
- Good Friday, a procession of five images: the Virgin of Sorrows, the Crucified Christ of Nazareth (also known as Christ of the Gypsies and the Roma of Him), the Virgin "Girl" (traditionally carried by the younger ones) and the Holy Sepulchre.
- On Palm Sunday, there is a procession with palms and olive branches.

==== Cross Day (May 3) ====
- Organised at several intersections throughout the town. Typical, this day is called "oven"

==== San Antonio - Patron of the town (13 June) ====
- That week is organized as the Cultural Week with many events for both young and old. On the 13th San Antonio is brought out in procession through the main streets.

==== Festivals of the Blessed Sacrament in October ====
- Are held the first weekend in October, leaving Sunday procession Satísimo Sacramento.

=== Attractions ===
==== Arab Baths - 12th Century ====
The Arab Baths are in the old part of town. For centuries it served as housing and consisted of three buildings, linked by arches and vaults with octagonal skylights. The type of parallel chambers may belong to the times of Taifas. The Arab baths of Cogollos Vega have been catalogued as a historic artistic monument of cultural interest, assuming the first step for restoration by the Ministry of Culture.

The baths date from about the twelfth century and are of the rural bath model from the Muslim period and, like many others in the province, have stood the test of time thanks to its solid structure. They have been occupied as a dwelling from its disuse in the sixteenth century. The tradition of public toilets, which since Roman times were a meeting point and an example of collective hygiene, did not fit the customs of the Christian conquerors. They appear as an old house, like many houses of the old town, that would go unnoticed if not for the large stone blocks that reinforce his corner and the sign of Arab Baths (12th - 14th century).

The doorway leads to a first rectangular room with massive brick vault barrel without skylights. It is the cold room or apodyterium. It served as wardrobe and a room for greeting and farewell to clients. An arched opening in the centre of the wall accesses the second room, tepidarium or warm room. Wider and taller than the apodyterium, in half-barrel vault cloister with twelve skylights with hexagonal lights that could have provided coloured lighting providing an ambience in this quiet zone and steam bath.

The third area is the hot room or caldarium, a little wider than the previous one which has fourteen hexagonal skylights of the same type, very rare, which enhance the uniqueness of this bath.

The existence of these Arab baths went unnoticed, except for its inhabitants, until the late nineteenth century. Then the art historian and specialist in Spanish-Muslim Manuel Gomez Moreno made a plan on behalf of these baths until 1975 was exhibited at the Archaeological Museum. In November of that year he presented the plan to the local council. In 1987 the house (baths) was purchased by the City of Cogollos Vega consisting of the bath, 100 square meters, and a courtyard 79 meters, for a price of 4,500,000 pesetas in 2003.

Later, in January 1991, the baths were declared a historic-artistic monument, and in 1996 the County Council (with a budget of 1,900,000 pesetas), undertook works of demolition of the walls and ceilings, original non-blinded holes, signs and paving partially crushed, plaster walls, and cleaning decks. The cost estimated by the Department of Culture for the restoration amounted to 211,000 Euros initially, and between other work includes undoing some of the work undertaken by the council without any archaeological rigour.

An archaeological and ethnographic museum is planned in the future.

==== Church of the Annunciation - 16th Century ====
The Church of the Annunciation is built on the site of an ancient mosque. The tower has Mudejar coffered ceilings. Inside, there is an 18th-century Baroque altarpiece and pictures of great artistic value, such as a work attributed to Alonso Cano, as well as other valuable ornaments and silverware. Impressed by the nobility and the brightness of the altarpiece in the chapel of the eighteenth century, a gift was received from an Aragon family, for which a portrait is preserved in the church. The sculptures that make up the church are all of the Granada school of the seventeenth and eighteenth centuries.

==== Arab Watchtower ====
The watchtower is constructed of masonry with large boulders interspersed. Also known as "the Tower", it is circular and cylindrical. There is a brick arch. Except the central slice, all else is of stone. A window would light over the single entry to the building and would be a channel of communication with the valley. In the north there is a window with the damaged edges and a hole in the bottom.

It served as a watchtower in Moorish times and was used during the Civil War. The tower is at 1,160 meters above sea level and has magnificent views over the Vega of Granada, Sierra Arana, the Cubillas and Sierra Elvira.

It has been recently restored and has built a lookout.

==== Penon de la Mata ====
The Peñón de la Mata is 1,669 m in height. In its slopes lie the archaeological remains of Neolithic settlements.

During the Spanish Civil War, the term término de Cogollos Vega served the area between the Francoist faction and the Spanish Republican Army. The area of La Mata was the scene of one of the most significant battles in the province of Granada, establishing itself as one of the pockets of Republican resistance, favoured as it was by the geographic situation in the area. Testimony to these facts are the large number of trenches that remain today.

==== Water Cave ====
La Cueva del Agua is situated on the slopes of the peak Cabezo del Asno in Sierra Arana. Currently, access is via two forest roads, from Vega, and from "Sotillo" Iznalloz.

The peculiar characteristics of the cavity, a chasm of more than 180 m deep, is almost in its natural state and has the development of pockets that stretch over three miles (5 km).

Since 1969 the cave has been managed by a Board of the County that bears his name, whose governing board consists of civil and cultural authorities in the province. In addition, since 1991 there is an Advisory Committee for management involving the municipalities of Iznalloz, Deifontes and Cogollos Vega, along with the University of Granada.

== See also ==
- List of municipalities in Granada
