= Alfaguara (disambiguation) =

Alfaguara may refer to:

- Alfaguara, a Spanish-language book publisher based in Madrid
- Alfaguara project, a blue whale conservation project in the northwest of Isla de Chiloé, southern Chile
- Sierra de la Alfaguara, a mountain range in the Cordillera Subbética in southern Spain
- Arboretum La Alfaguara, a public park in the Sierra de la Alfaguara, in Alfacar near Granada in Spain
