= Sierra de Cogollos =

Mountain range in Granada Province, Andalusia, Spain

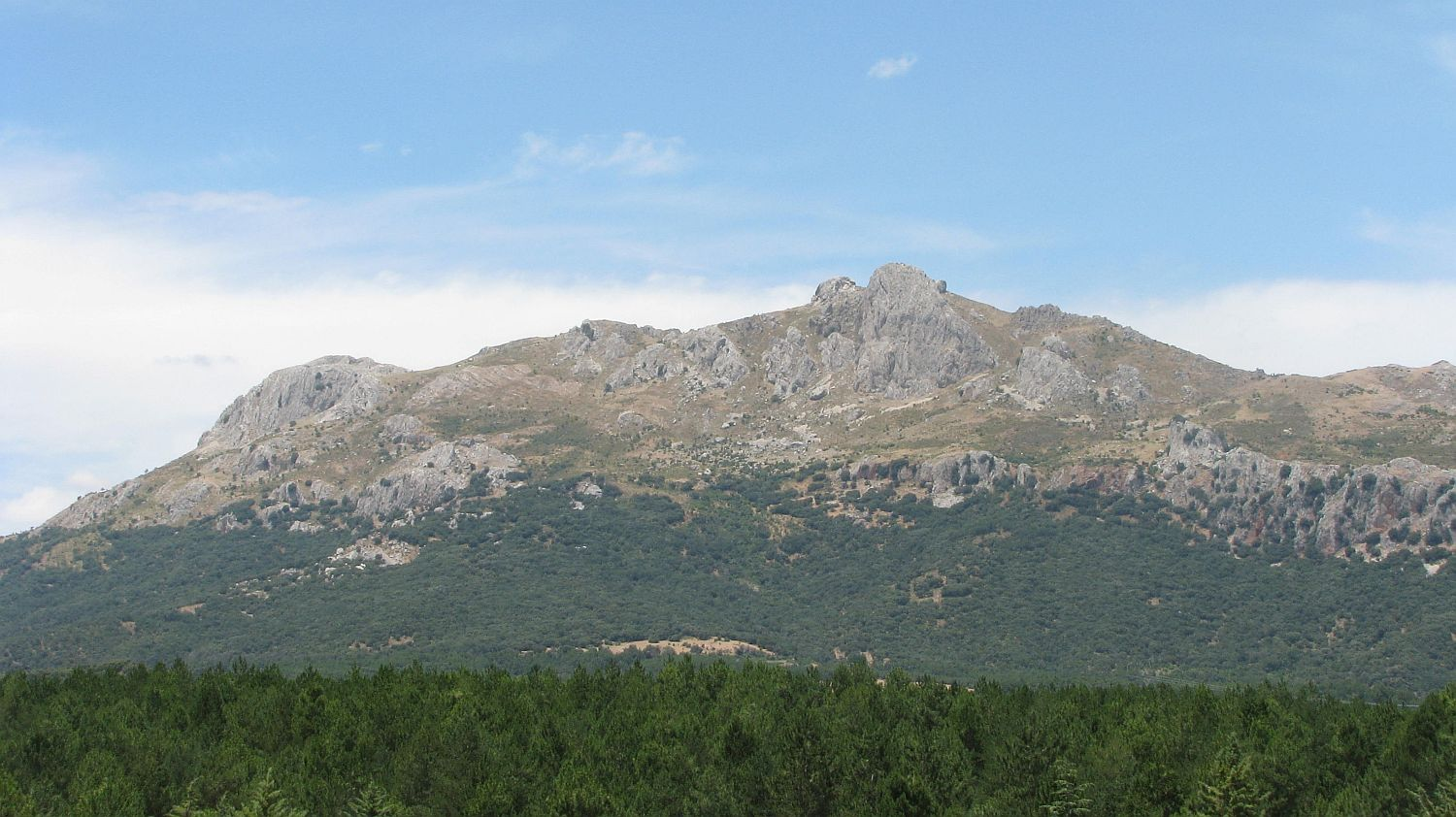
- View of the Sierra de Cogollos with its highest point, the Majalijar

Highest point
- Peak: Peñón del Majalijar
- Elevation: 1,889 m (6,198 ft)
- Coordinates: 37°17′30″N 03°31′40″W

Dimensions
- Length: 9 km (5.6 mi) NE/SW
- Width: 2.5 km (1.6 mi) SE/NW

Geography
- Location within Spain
- Location: Granada Province, Andalusia
- Country: Spain
- Parent range: Subbaetic System

Geology
- Rock age(s): Triassic and Jurassic
- Mountain type: Limestone

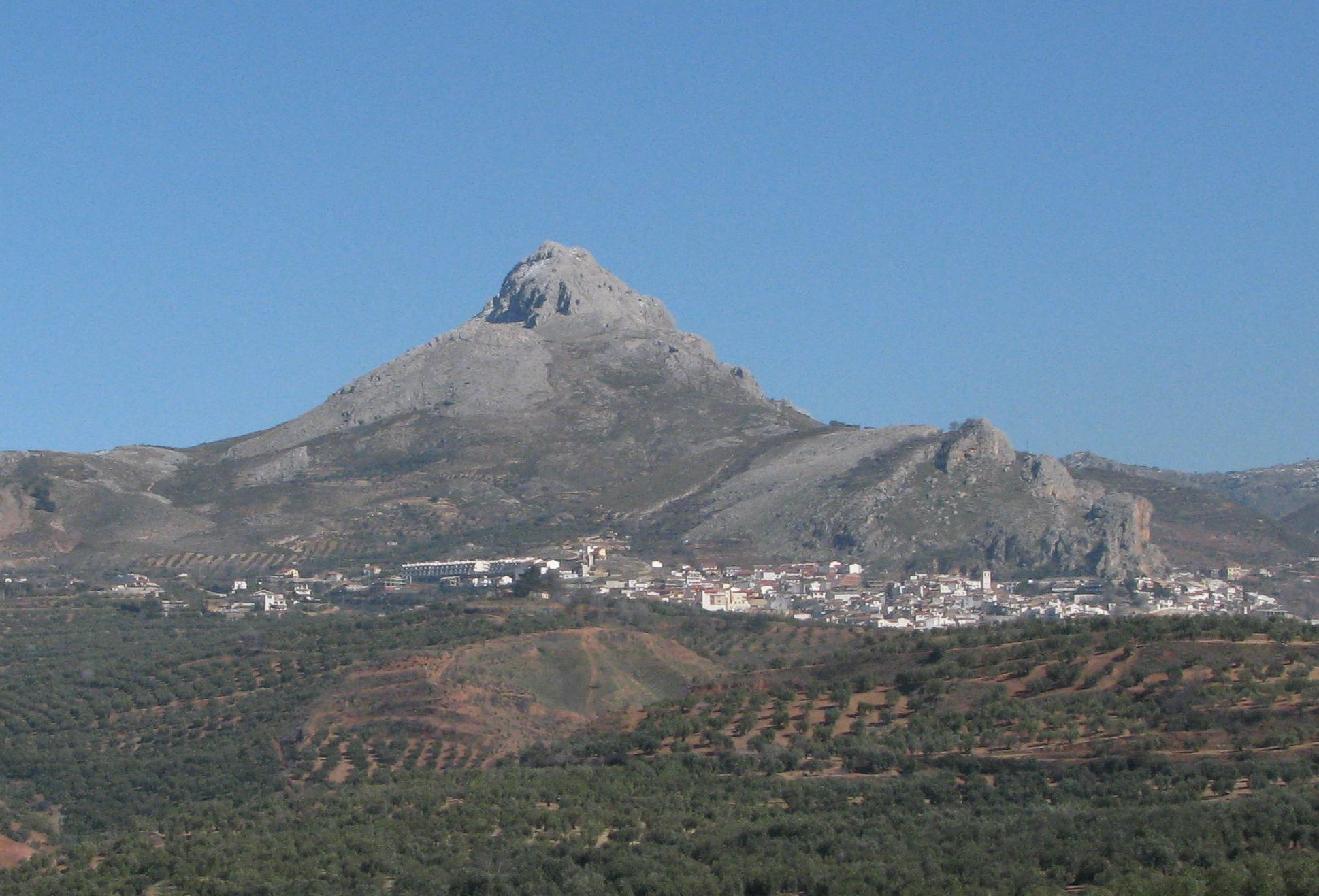
The impressive Peñón de la Mata

The Sierra de Cogollos is a mountain range of the Baetic System in Granada Province, Andalusia, Spain.

The range is located to the northeast of Granada city. Its highest point is the 1,889 m high Peñón del Majalijar peak.

== Geography ==
The Sierra de Cogollos extends between the Vega de Granada valley to the west and the Axarquía in the east. To the north the narrow Blanco River valley separates it from the Sierra Arana and to the south, another narrow valley, carved by the Bermejo River marks the limit with the lower Sierra de la Yedra range. The northeastern sector of the Sierra de Cogollos merges with Sierra Arana.

This mountain range includes the Peñón de la Mata, a limestone mountain topped by a massive rocky outcrop that is 1,669 metres (5,476 ft) in height and that towers above Cogollos Vega town. Peñón del Majalijar, the ranges's highest summit is located at the other end of the range. The Sierra de Cogollos is mostly included within the municipal term of Cogollos Vega, with a little part within Huétor Santillán at its eastern end.

=== Protected areas ===
The Sierra de Cogollos, along with the neighboring ranges of Sierra de la Alfaguara, Sierra de Huétor, Sierra de Diezma, Sierra de Beas, as well as the southern part of the Sierra de Arana, is a protected area under the name Sierra de Huétor and la Alfaguara Natural Park (Parque Natural de la Sierra de Huétor y la Alfaguara).

=== Geology ===
Geologically the Sierra de Cogollos belongs to the Baetic System and is made up mainly of sedimentary rocks from the Triassic, Jurassic and Cretaceous.

== See also ==
- Baetic System
- Geology of the Iberian Peninsula
