= Sierra de Huétor and la Alfaguara Natural Park =

Natural park in Andalusia, Spain

Sierra de Huétor and la Alfaguara Natural Park (Parque Natural de la Sierra de Huétor y la Alfaguara)
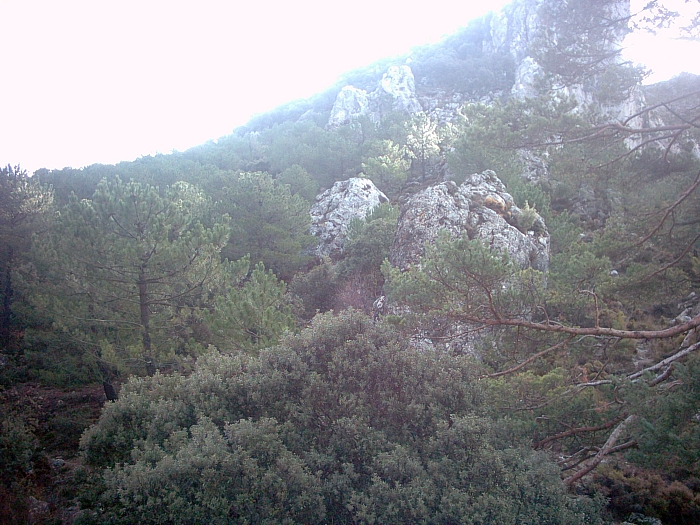
- Slope in the Sierra de Huétor

- Location within Spain
- Coordinates: 37°14′53″N 3°31′56″W
- Area: 12,128 hectares (29,970 acres)
- Created: 1989

The Sierra de Huétor and la Alfaguara Natural Park (Spanish: Parque Natural de la Sierra de Huétor y la Alfaguara) is a natural park in Andalusia, Spain. It is located near Granada city and was established in 1989.

== Topography ==
The area of the park includes mountain ranges of moderate altitude such as the Sierra de Huétor, Sierra de la Alfaguara, Sierra de Cogollos, Sierra de Diezma, Sierra de Beas, Sierra de la Yedra as well as the southern end of the Sierra de Arana. The highest point within the park zone is the Peñón del Majalijar in the Sierra de Cogollos, at 1,889 metres (6,198 ft). Nearby Peñón de la Cruz is higher, at 2,027 metres (6,650 ft) but lies outside the park limits further north in the Sierra de Arana. Other peaks in the park zone are Peñon de la Mata at 1,669 metres (5,476 ft) and Peñon Grande at 1,713 metres (5,620 ft). The mountains have dramatic geological features including cliffs, caves, narrow ravines and springs. They are the source of the Darro River and Fardes River. The Fardes is abundant in trout and is popular with sport fishers.

== Human activity ==
The park is a few kilometers northeast of Granada, and city residents often visit on the weekends. It is accessible via the A-92, which unfortunately cuts the park in half, connecting Granada to Guadix. It contains the Arboretum La Alfaguara, formerly a tree nursery that supplied mainly coniferous plants for the reforestation of the entire Sierra de Huétor. The arboretum is now an educational tourist attraction.

The park is just east of the town of Alfácar. It contains the villages of Víznar, Huétor Santillán and Beas de Granada, with a total human population of about 10,000. The neoclassical Palacio de El Cuzco in Víznar has been declared a National Monument. There is a visitor's information center at Puerto de Lobo, near Víznar. The center has walks and a picnic area, and a fenced-in area with birds, stags and mountain goats. Las Mimbres has a recovery centre for endangered animals. There are campsites in Alfácar and Huétor-Santillán. From Víznar and Huétor-Santillán there are magnificent views of the Sierra Nevada National Park to the east and south. The terrain is accessible to walkers through forest tracks, open hillsides, and open woodland with clearings and glades.

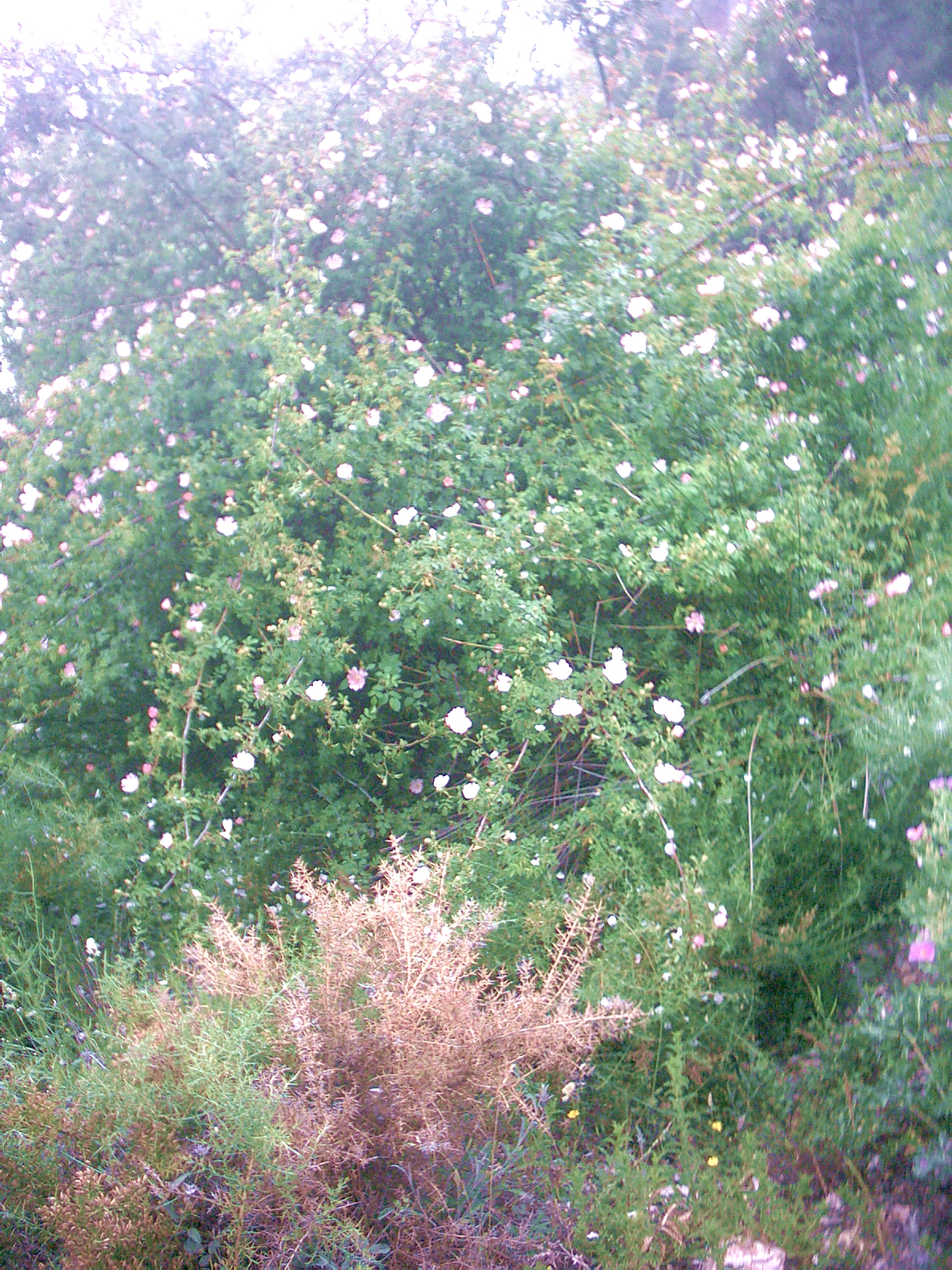
Rosa pimpinellifolia habitat, Sierra de la Alfaguara

== Flora ==
Originally the mountains were covered in maple and oak forests. These trees was largely cleared for agriculture and charcoal production, causing erosion. In an effort to stabilize the land in the last century the mountain slopes were planted with Aleppo, Laricio and Austrian pines, now the dominant types of tree. Less common evergreens include maritime pines, Atlas cedars and Spanish firs. The north of the park has deciduous woodlands with native holm oak as well as gall oaks and maples. The higher-altitude oak woods harbor shrubs beneath the trees that include Spanish barberry, hedgehog broom various species of dog roses. There are many smaller species of flowering plants.

== Fauna ==
The blue lysandra bellargus ssp alfacariensis butterfly is endemic to the region, first discovered in the Sierra de Huétor. In 2002 the park was designated a Special Protection Area for birds. There are tits, robins and chaffinches in the woodlands, warblers and rock buntings in the higher rocky areas. Birds of prey include golden eagles and booted eagles, buzzards, northern goshawks and Eurasian sparrowhawks, little owls and tawny owls.

Ladder snakes, Montpellier snakes, snub-nosed vipers and many types of lizards are found in the park. It is home to many mammals including foxes, rabbits and weasels.

There are also genets, badgers, beech martens, wildcats, wild boar and Spanish ibex. The trees host healthy populations of red squirrels and dormouse. Voles live in the forest floor.

== Gallery ==
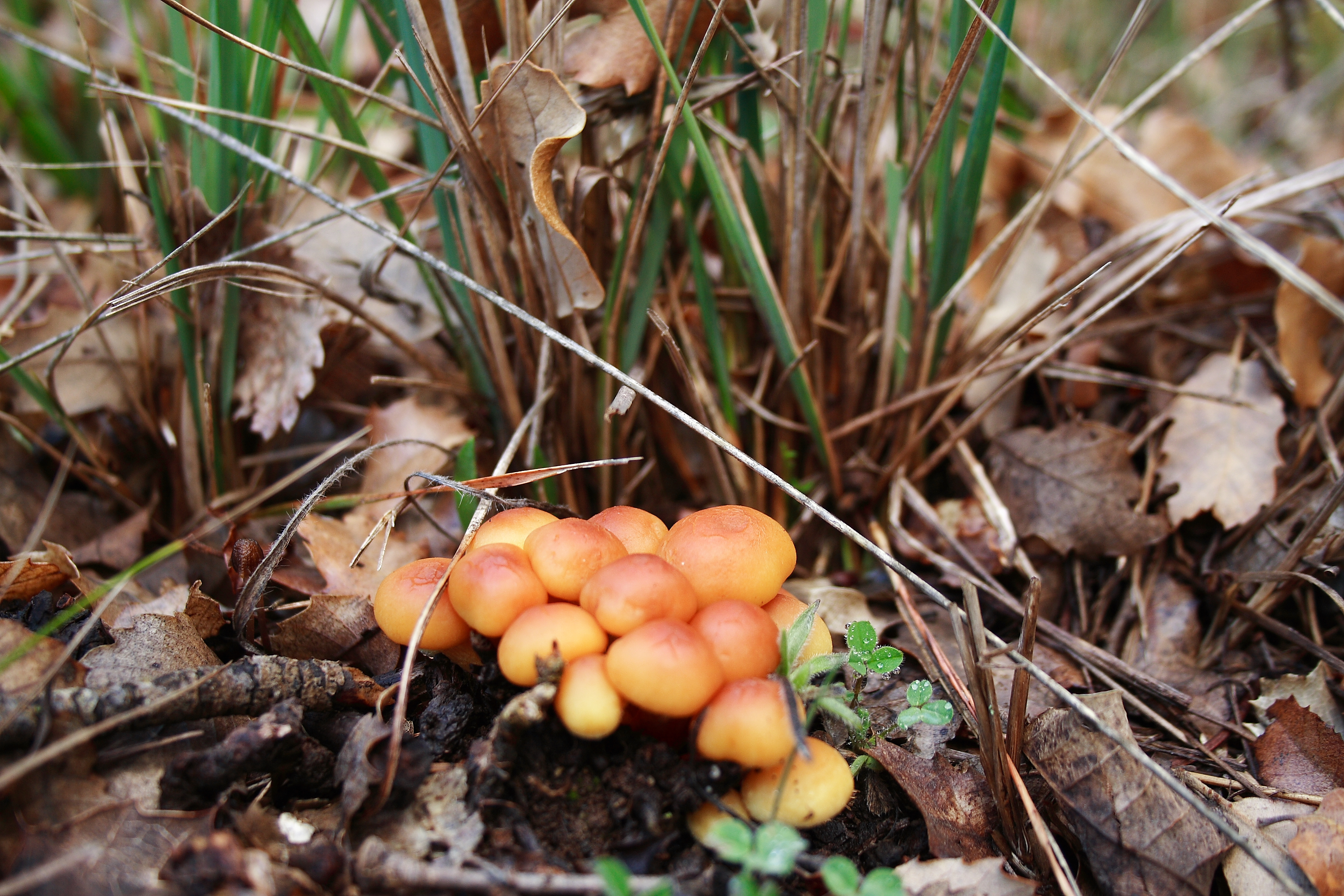
Fungi

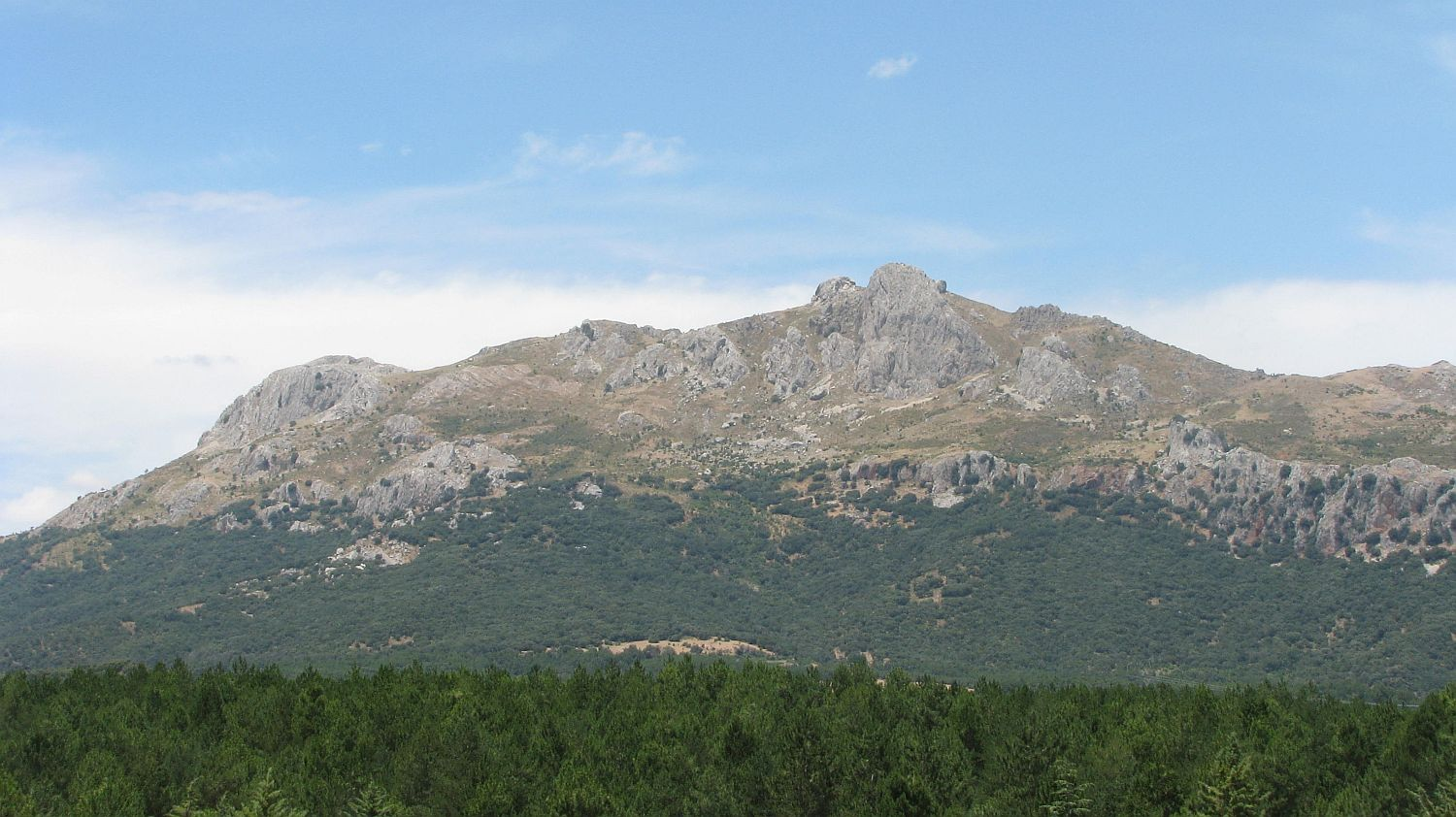
View of the Sierra de Cogollos with its highest point, 1,889 m high Peñón del Majalijar

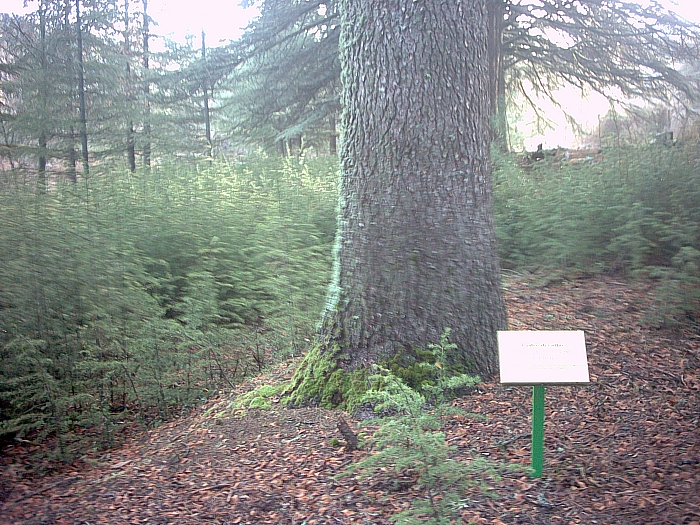
Trunk of an Atlas cedar in the arboretum, with a thick formation of seedlings
