= Subbaetic System =

Mountain range in the Iberian Peninsula

- Sistema Subbético
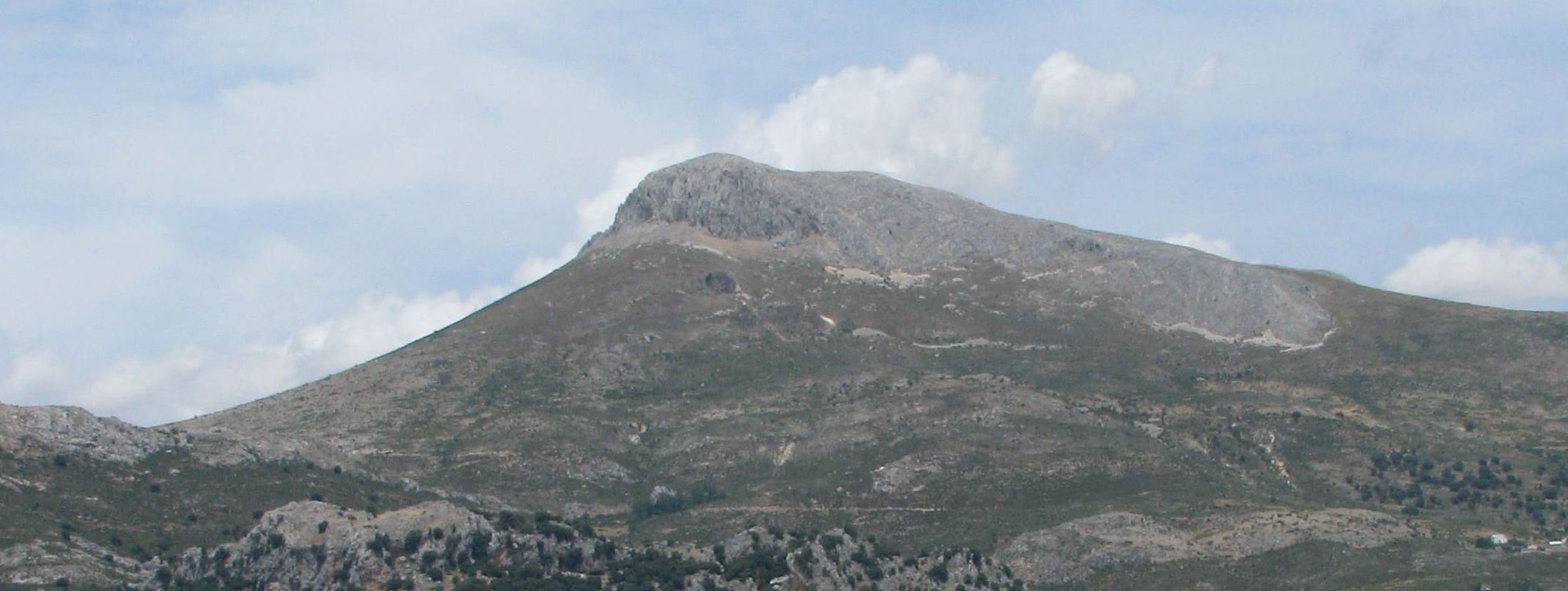
- Peña de la Cruz, the highest peak in the Sierra Arana

Highest point
- Peak: Peña de la Cruz
- Elevation: 2,027 m (6,650 ft)

Dimensions
- Length: 510 km (320 mi) ENE/WSW
- Width: 60 km (37 mi) NNW/SSE

Geography
- Location within Spain
- Location: Andalusia / Murcia
- Country: Spain
- Range coordinates: 37°33′0″N 3°22′0″W
- Parent range: Baetic System

Geology
- Orogeny: Alpine orogeny
- Rock age: Cenozoic
- Rock type: Limestone

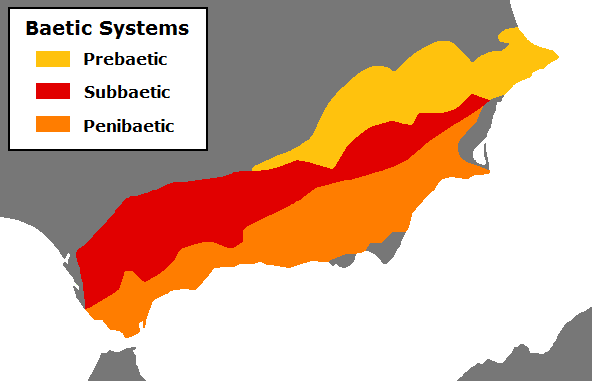
Schematic representation of the Baetic System of mountain ranges

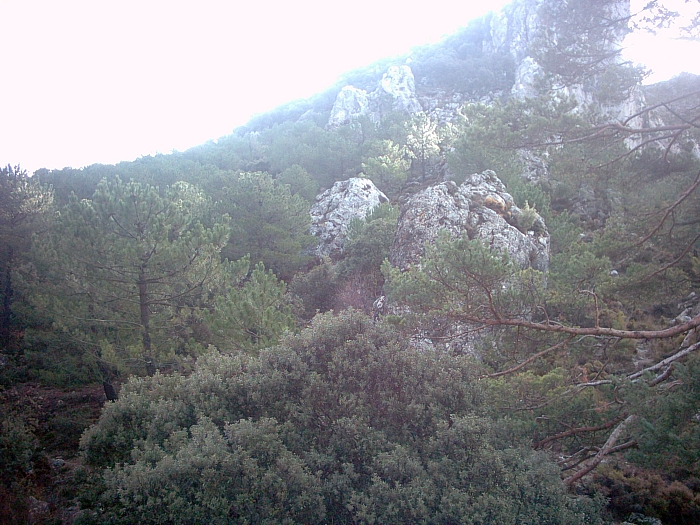
Sierra de Huétor, Alfacar, Granada Province

The Subbaetic or Sub-Baetic System (Spanish: Sistema Subbético or Cordillera Subbética) is one of the three systems of mountain ranges of the Baetic System in the southern Iberian Peninsula. Highest point 2,027 m (6,650 ft) high Peña de la Cruz in Sierra Arana. Its northern limit includes the valley of the Guadalquivir in its western part.

== Description ==
The Subbaetic System runs to the north of the Cordillera Penibética from Cape Trafalgar in Cádiz Province across Andalusia reaching into the Region of Murcia. The highest peaks reach heights between 1,500m and well over 2,000 m.

Towards the east of the Sierra Sur de Jaén, east of Martos, another subsystem begins, the Prebaetic System, an offshoot of the Subbaetic System stretching further northeastwards. The materials that compose this eastern sector were formed in a relatively shallow sea.

== Main mountain ranges ==
Some of the mountain ranges that make up the Subbaetic System are, from west to east:

- Sierra del Aljibe, includes the Alcornocales Natural Park
- Sierra de Grazalema
- Sierra Sur de Sevilla, highest points Terril (1,132 m) and Peñón de Algámitas (1,128 m)
- Subbaetic Ranges of Córdoba
  - Sierra de Rute, highest point 1,326 m
  - Sierra de la Horconera, highest point Pico Tiñosa (1,570 m), highest point in Córdoba Province, and Pico Bermejo (1,476 m)
  - Sierra de los Pollos, close to Carcabuey and Priego de Córdoba
  - Sierra de Gaena
  - Sierra de Jarcas
  - Sierra de los Lanchares, includes interesting formations, like the Lapiaz de los Lanchares
  - Sierra del Lobatejo, highest point 1,217 m
  - Sierra Alcaide
  - Picacho de la Sierra de Cabra, highest point 1,217 m, includes the Ermita de la Virgen de la Sierra
- Sierra de Gibalbín
- Sierra Elvira
- Sierra de Parapanda
- Sierra de Loja
- Sierra Harana
- Sierra de Cogollos
- Sierra de Huétor
- Sierra de la Alfaguara
- Sierra Sur de Jaén, overlapping with the Sistema Prebético.

== See also ==
- Prebaetic System
- Baetic Cordillera
