= Sierra Arana =

Mountain range in Granada, Spain

- Sierra Harana
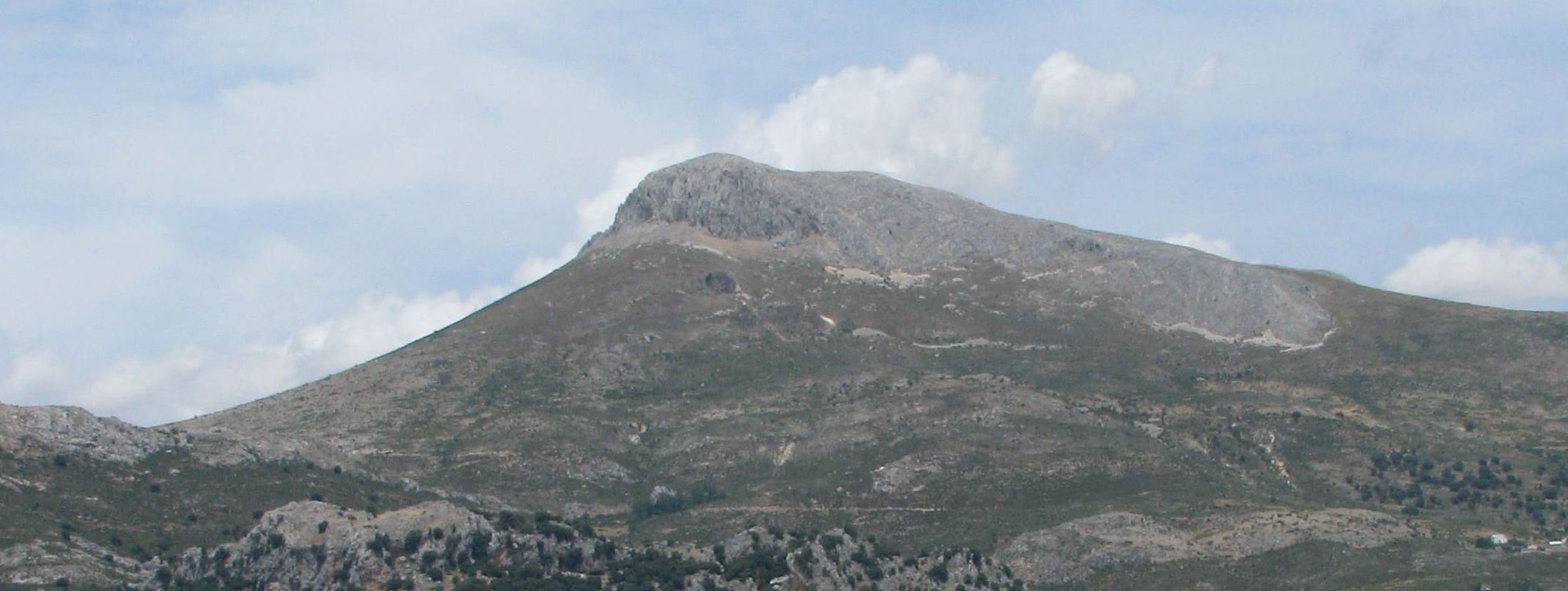
- Peña de la Cruz, the highest peak in the Sierra Arana

Highest point
- Peak: Peña de la Cruz
- Elevation: 2,027 m (6,650 ft)

Dimensions
- Length: 510 km (320 mi)
- Width: 60 km (37 mi)

Geography
- Location within Spain
- Location: Andalusia
- Country: Spain
- Range coordinates: 37°20′0″N 3°30′0″W
- Parent range: Subbaetic System

Geology
- Orogeny: Alpine orogeny
- Rock age: Cenozoic
- Rock type: Limestone

The Sierra Arana or Sierra de Arana, also known as Sierra Harana, is a mountain range in the center of the province of Granada, southern Spain. Its highest peak is the Peña de la Cruz, at 2,027 m (6,650 ft).

== Description ==
The Sierra Arana is a mostly karstic range, part of the larger Subbaetic System. According to some geographers it includes other ranges such as the Sierra de Cogollos, the Sierra de la Yedra and the Sierra de Alfacar y Víznar.

Municipalities located in the Sierra Arana include Deifontes, Iznalloz, Cogollos Vega, Huétor Santillán, Diezma, Darro, La Peza, Píñar, Morelábor, and Huélago. The area of the range is bounded in the north by the Comarca of Los Montes and its southern end is included in the area of the Sierra de Huétor and la Alfaguara Natural Park.

== See also ==
- Subbaetic System
- Baetic System
