= Genil =

Coordinates: 37°41′37″N 5°19′00″W

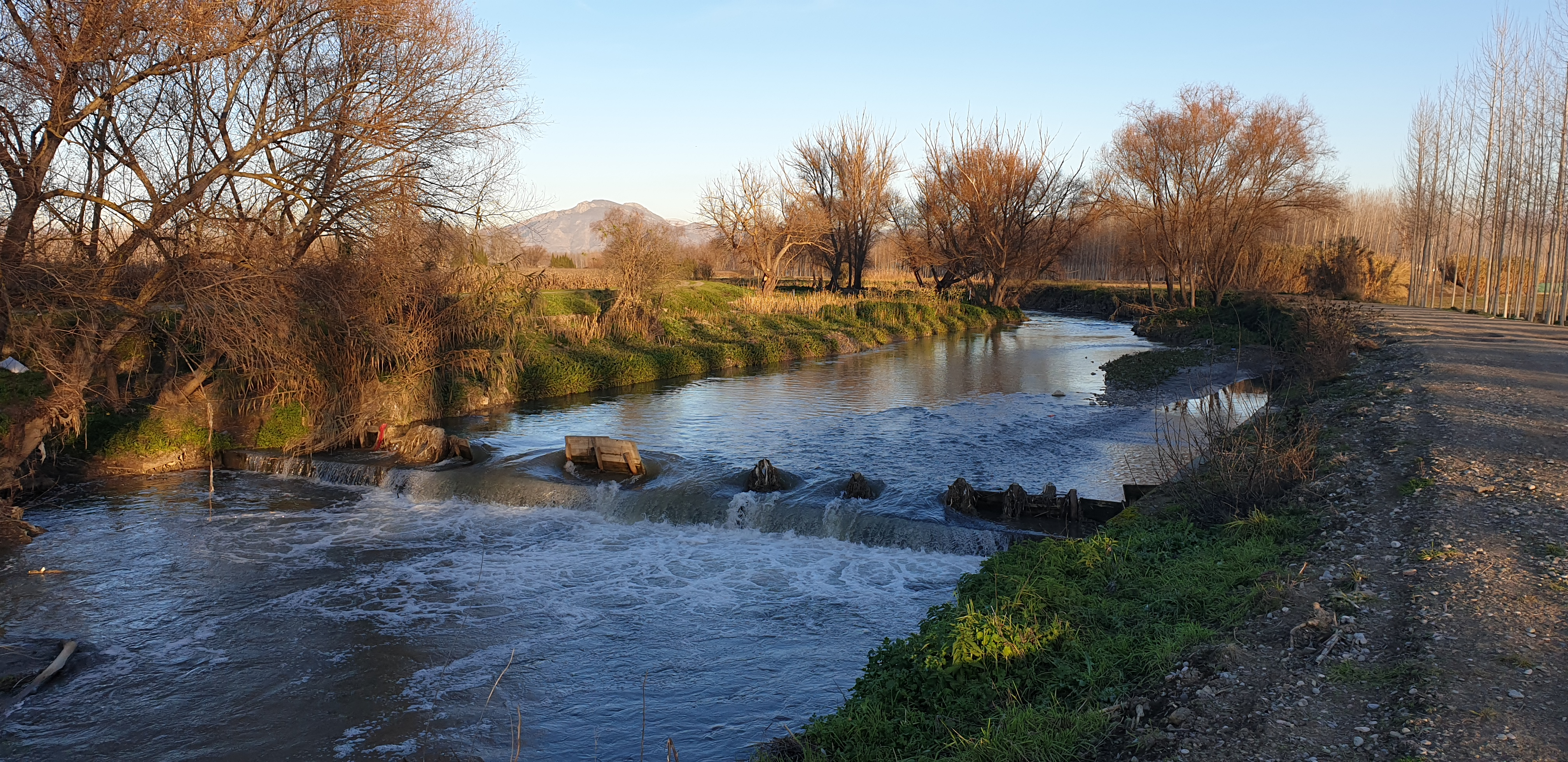
- Genil flowing through the municipality of Fuente Vaqueros

Location
- Country: Spain
- Region: Andalusia
- Cities: Granada, Écija

Physical characteristics
- Source
  - location: Sierra Nevada, Granada Province
- Mouth: Guadalquivir
  - location: at Sanlúcar de Barameda
- Length: 358 km (222 mi)
- Basin size: 8,278 km^{2} (3,196 sq mi)

Basin features
- Progression: Guadalquivir→ Gulf of Cádiz

The Genil River is the main (left) tributary of the river Guadalquivir in Andalusia, Spain. Known as Singilis in Latin, its modern name derives from the Moorish rendering of the Roman name: Sinyil, Sannil, and Sinnil.

== Route ==
The source of the Genil is in the Sierra Nevada, north of its highest peak Mulhacén. The Genil flows through the towns Granada, Loja, Puente Genil and Écija. It flows into the Guadalquivir River near Palma del Río. Its main tributaries are the Darro in the Province of Granada and the Cabra River in the Province of Córdoba.

== Geological history ==
The river today drains the Granada basin. In the latest Tortonian and the middle and late Turolian (9.0–5.3 Ma) this was an endorheic basin. Rivers flowed from the east and southwest into a central lake with no exit. During the Pliocene, the western part of the basin was drained by the paleo-Cacín river system, which flowed to the north and then left the basin to the west. The eastern part was drained by the Alhambra system, or paleo-Genil system, was fed by the mountains to the east and fed a small endorheic lake in the north. Some time later, the Genil river changed course to flow west, where it joined the paleo-Cacin system, and the basin became exorheic.

== See also ==
- List of rivers of Spain
