= Arboretum La Alfaguara =

Public park in Alfacar, Spain

Coordinates: 37.26002°N 3.53065°W

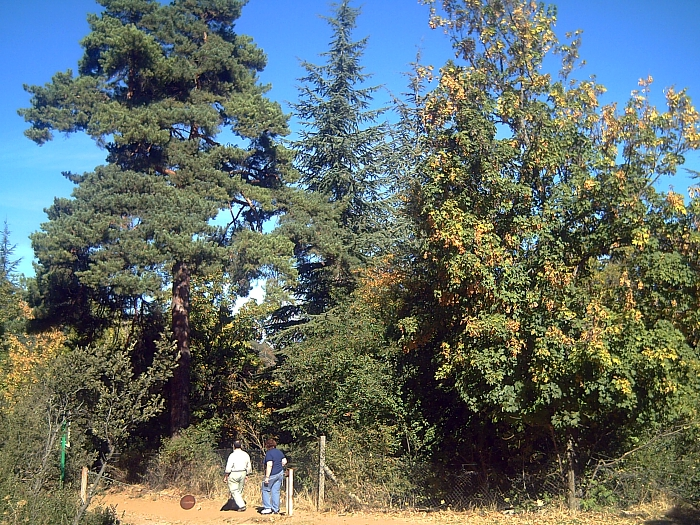
View of the Arboretum de la Alfaguara

The Arboretum La Alfaguara was formerly a tree nursery in the Sierra de la Alfaguara, in Alfacar near Granada in Spain. It contains samples of many of the trees that are scattered throughout the Sierra and the surrounding mountain ranges.

The whole Sierra has been classified as the "Parque Natural Sierra de Huétor". Next to the Arboretum is an entertainment area aimed at schoolchildren in the province of Granada and in Andalusia as a whole. The Arboretum and entertainment area are administered by the Ministry of Environment of the Junta de Andalucía. The Arboretum lies on the GR-3103 road about 12 kilometres (7.5 mi) from the town of Granada, and about 4 kilometres (2.5 mi) from Alfacar.

A forest trail starting from Fuente Grande also leads into the Sierra de Huétor.

== History ==
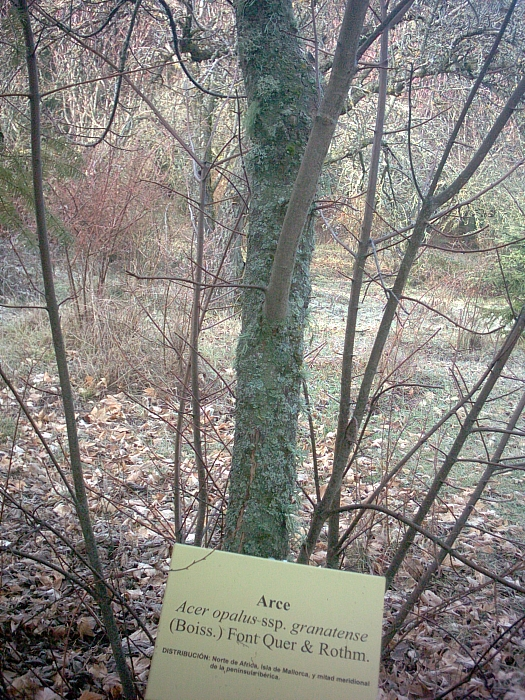
Acer opalus ssp. granatense, an endemic species is the province of Granada and the southwest of Spain.

For most of the last century the Arboretum was a nursery that supplied mainly coniferous plants for the reforestation of the entire Sierra de Huétor, which had had its original vegetation completely destroyed by over-exploitation for forestry and livestock raising. The Arboretum was opened to the public in 2003 after the grounds, walking trails and information panels of the plants found here were established. In 2005 the Association of Scouts of Andalusia rebuilt the road that runs through the arboretum itself.

== Trees and birds ==
The trees found here are deciduous and evergreen coniferous, intermingled as in the natural environment. There are scientific name labels at the foot of the most significant specimens.

=== Deciduous trees ===
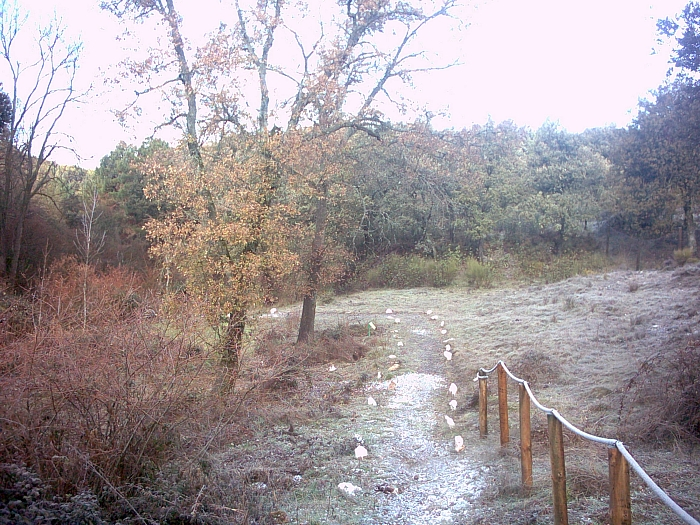
Delimited path in the Arboretum with some Quercus faginea in the month of January

- Cherry ( Prunus avium L.)
- Hawthorn (Crataegus monogyna Jacq. )
- Pear ( Pyrus communis L.)
- Cherry St. Lucia ( Prunus manleb L.)
- Apple ( Malus domestica Borkh. )
- Blackthorn ( Prunus espinosa L.)
- Elm ( Ulmus minor Mill )
- Hazel ( Corylus avellana L.)
- Acer ( Acer opalus subsp. granatense ( Boiss. ) Font Quer & Rothm. )
- Gall ( Quercus faginea Lam. )
- Poplar, Poplar ( Populus nigra L.)
- White poplar ( Populus alba L.)
- Hybrid poplar ( Populus x canadensis Moench and Populus x euromericana ( Dode ) Guinier )
- White willow ( Salix alba L. )

=== Evergreens and conifers ===
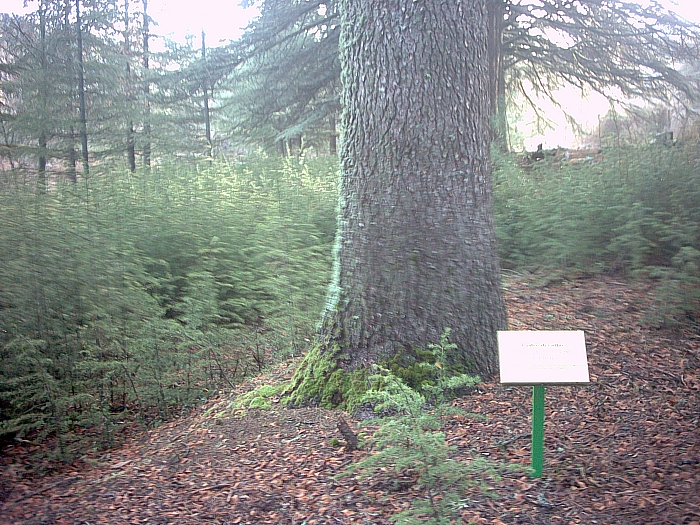
Trunk of one of the Atlas Cedars Cedrus atlantica, with a thick formation of seedlings

The stars of the Arboretum are several Atlas cedars with trunks 2 metres (6.6 ft) to 3 metres (9.8 ft) in diameter, under whose canopy there is a thick formation of seedlings.

- Atlas cedar ( Cedrus atlantica ( Endl. ) Carr )
- Maritime or maritime pine ( Pinus pinaster Ant )
- Yellow pine ( Pinus ponderosa Dougl. ex Lawson )
- Pine ( Pinus nigra Arnold )
- Endemic pine ( Pinus sylvestris subsp. nevadensis )
- Oak ( Quercus rotundifolia Lam. )
- Pinsapo ( Abies pinsapo Boiss. )
- Spruce ( Picea abies ( L. ) H.Karst. )
- Oregon cedar ( Chamaecyparis lawsoniana ( A.Murray ) Parl. )
- Prickly juniper ( Juniperus oxycedrus L. )

=== Birds ===
Many birds nest is the Arboretum including:

- Goldfinch ( Carduelis carduelis )
- Crossbill ( Loxia curvirostra )
- Greenfinch ( Carduelis chloris )
- Tit ( Parus caeruleus )
- Blackbird ( Turdus merula )
- Kinglet ( Regulus regulus )

== Facilities ==
Facilities in the Arboretum include:

- Bar-restaurant is located at the entrance of the Alfaguara, of relatively recent construction, with a large terrace.
- Camping Area. Designated area for tents, where groups of schoolchildren spend the summer season.
- Sports and leisure areas. With a large swimming pool, soccer field.

== See also ==
- List of botanical gardens in Andalusia
