= Chauchina =

- Municipality
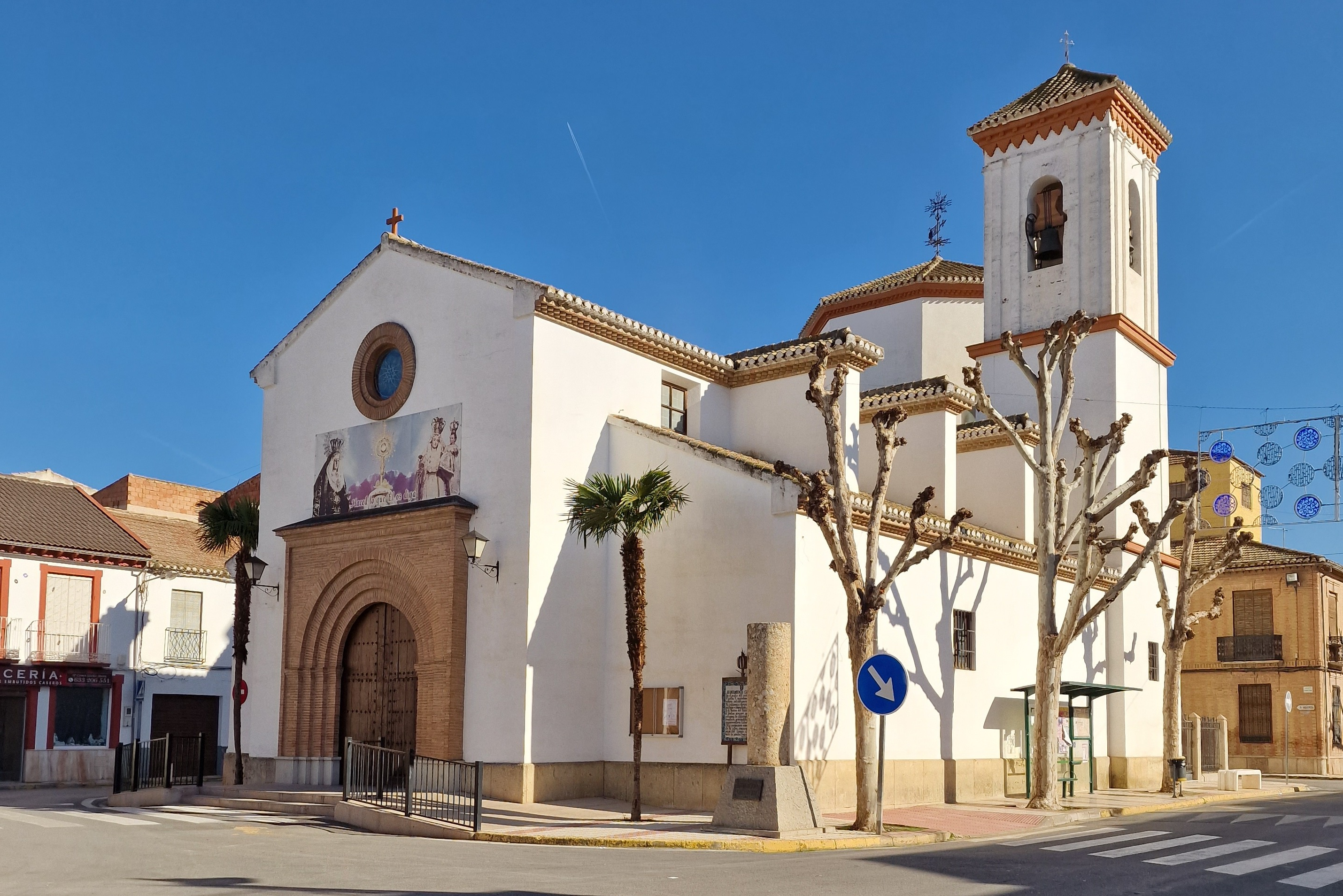
- View of Chauchina

- Flag Coat of arms

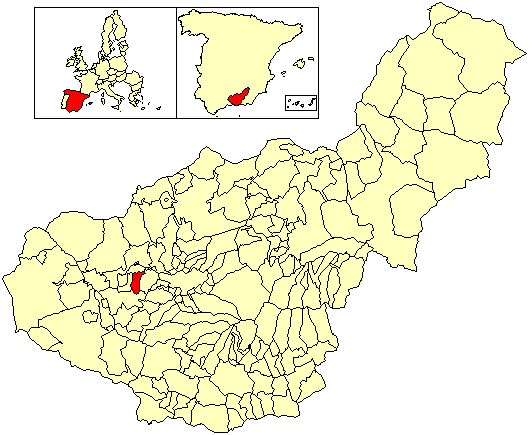
- Location of Chauchina

- Location in Spain
- Coordinates: 37°12′N 3°46′W
- Country: Spain
- Autonomous community: Andalusia
- Province: Granada
- Comarca: Vega de Granada
- Judicial district: Santa Fe
- Commonwealth: Vega Baja de Granada

Government
  - Alcaldesa: María del Carmen Pérez Rodríguez (2007) (IU)

Area
  - Total: 21.21 km^{2} (8.19 sq mi)
- Elevation: 551 m (1,808 ft)

Population (2025-01-01)
  - Total: 5,817
  - Density: 274.3/km^{2} (710.3/sq mi)
- Demonym(s): Chauchinero, -ra
- Time zone: UTC+1 (CET)
  - Summer (DST): UTC+2 (CEST)
- Postal code: 18330
- Website: Official website

Chauchina is a municipality in the province of Granada, in Spain.

== See also ==
- List of municipalities in Granada
