= Diezma =

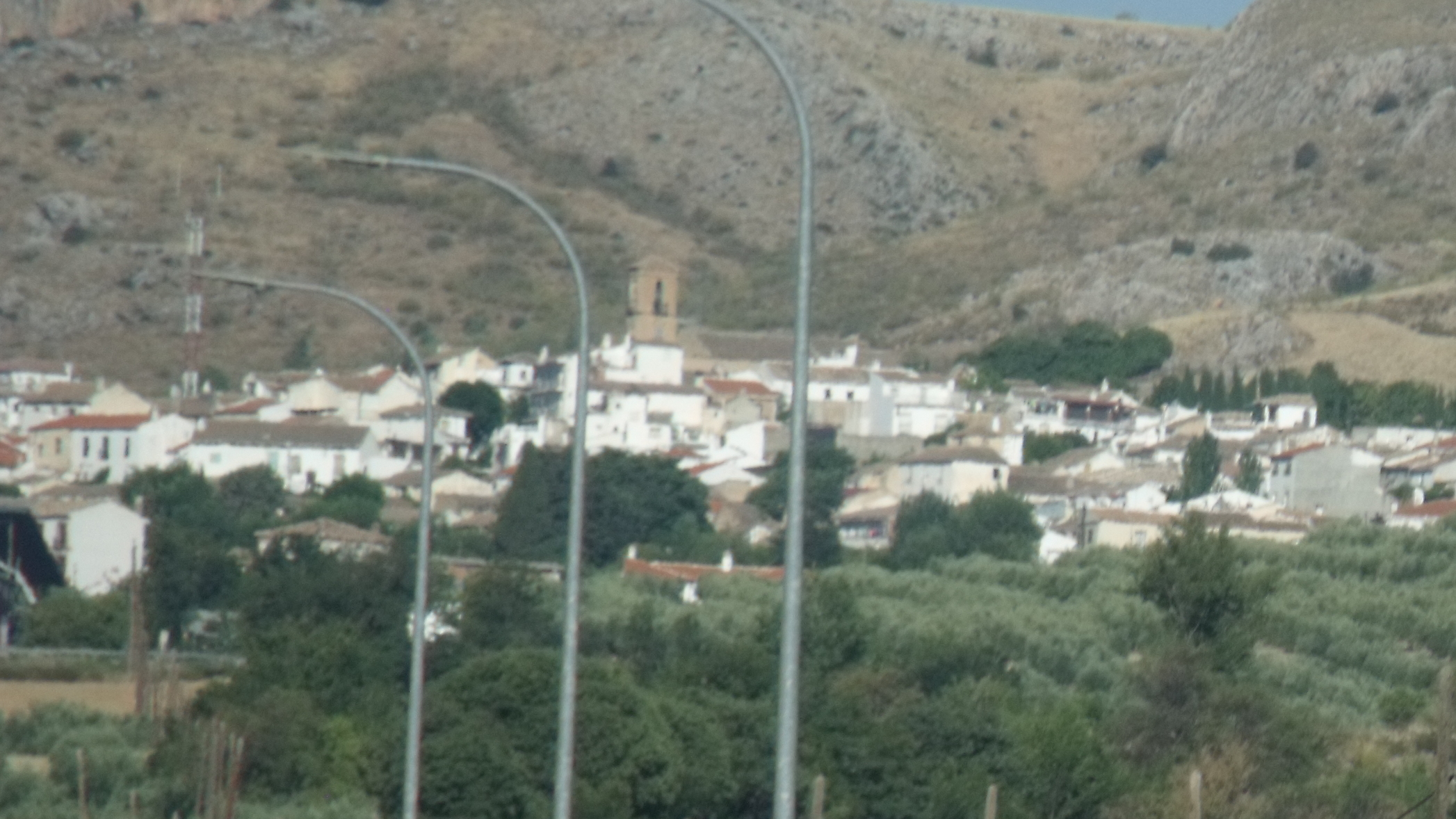
- View of Diezma

- Flag Coat of arms

- Location in Spain.
- Coordinates: 37°19′N 3°20′W
- Country: Spain
- Province: Granada
- Comarca: Guadix

Government
  - Mayor: José Jesús García Rodríguez

Area
  - Total: 41 km^{2} (16 sq mi)
- Elevation: 1,233 m (4,045 ft)

Population (2025-01-01)
  - Total: 829
  - Density: 20/km^{2} (52/sq mi)
- Time zone: UTC+1 (CET)
  - Summer (DST): UTC+2 (CEST)

Diezma is a municipality located in the province of Granada, Spain.

It lies between the Sierra de Huétor Natural Park and the new reservoir of Francisco Abellán.

== History ==
Some think the name of this municipality came from the Roman era and others from the tributes that were paid to the Church during the phase of the Visigoths. In any case, it is clear that during the Roman Empire, Diezma was a kind of hospice for travellers who were on the Via Augusta between Acci and Iliberis. Later, during the Islamic domination of Spain, it became a farming country.

It suffered frequent incursions by the Zirids first, and then knights of Alfonso VI before the final conquest by the Catholic Monarchs. In 1536, it was purchased from the Crown of Castile by Luis Guiral who acquired the title of Mayorazgo Diezma. In the 20th century, it was a busy first stopping place on the main road from Granada to Murcia and Almería. Later, it returned to a quiet town, farming olives and cherries and producing anise in which it also preserves its cherries.

== See also ==
- List of municipalities in Granada
