= Baetic System =

System of mountain ranges in Spain

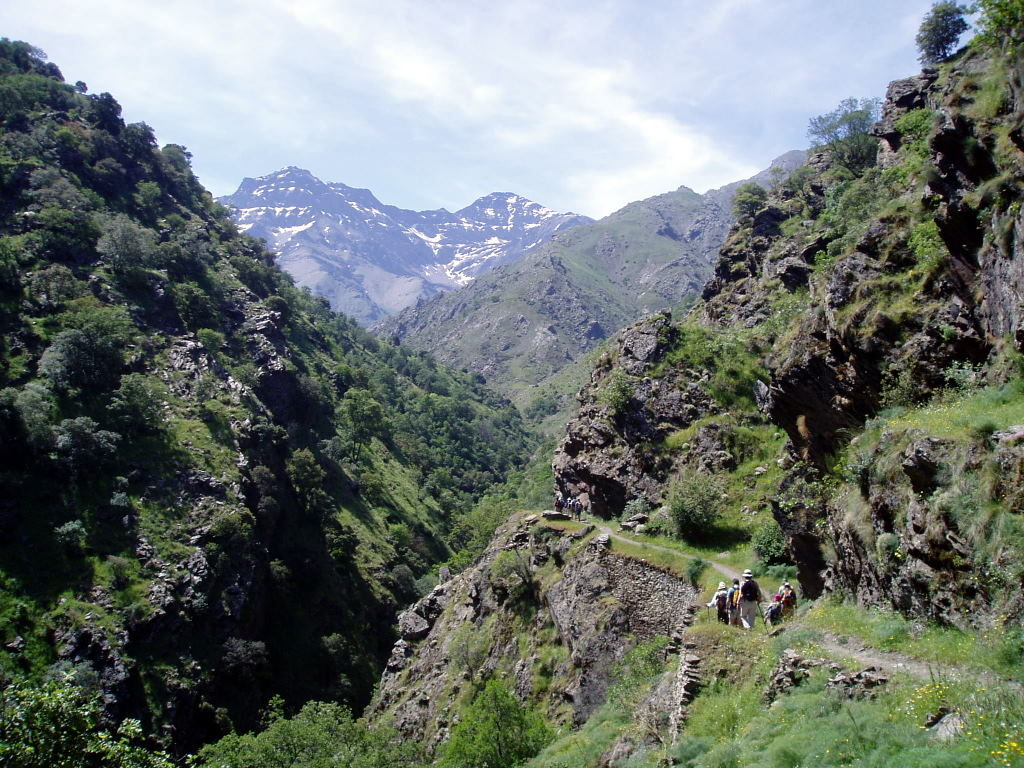
- Mulhacén seen from the Vereda de la Estrella in Sierra Nevada National Park

Highest point
- Peak: Mulhacén
- Elevation: 3,478.6 m (11,413 ft)

Geography
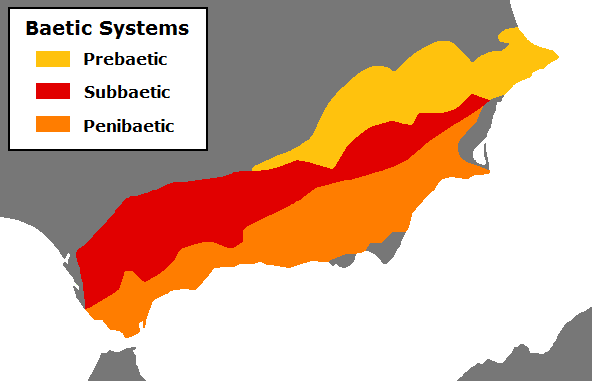
- Schematic representation of the Baetic System of mountain ranges
- Countries: Spain and little bit in Gibraltar (UK)
- Region(s): mostly Andalusia, small parts in Murcia, Castile-La Mancha, Valencian Community and Gibraltar (only Rock)
- Range coordinates: 37°N 5°W
- Parent range: Gibraltar Arc

Geology
- Orogeny: Alpine Orogeny

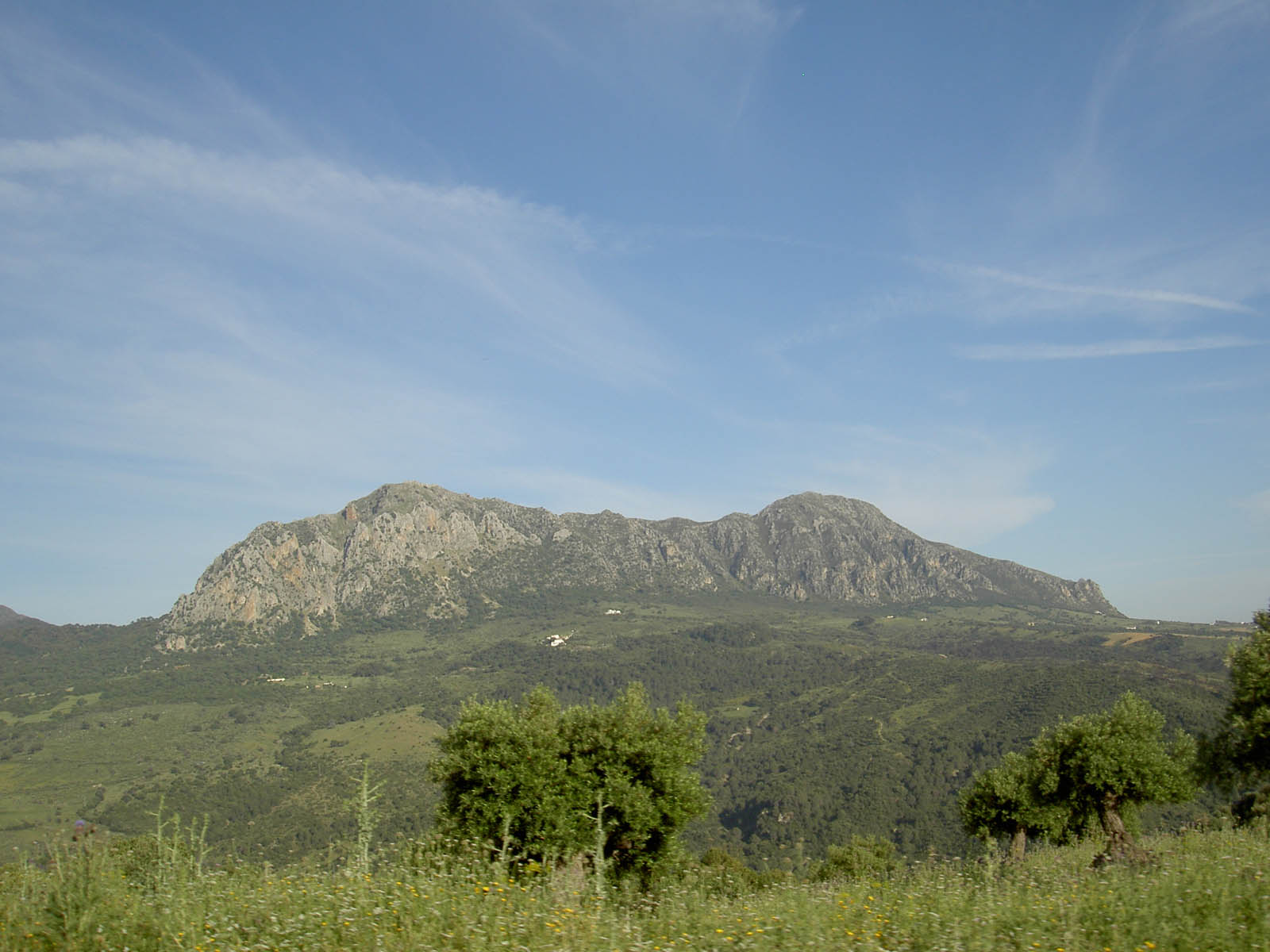
Sierra Crestellina, near Casares

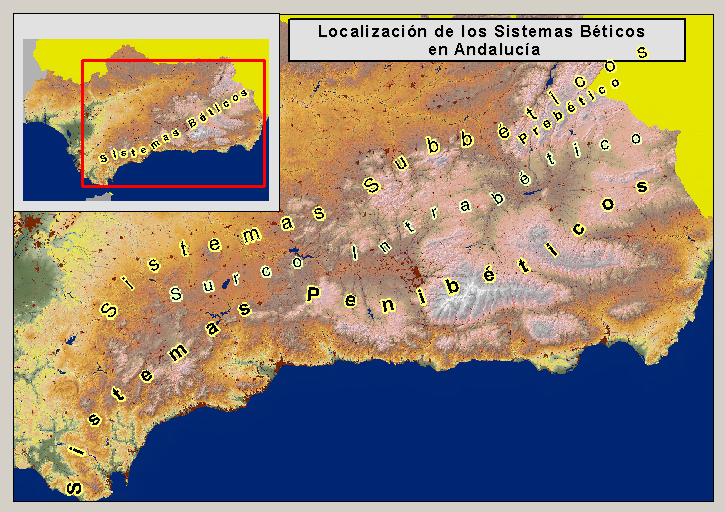
Map of the Baetic System in Andalusia

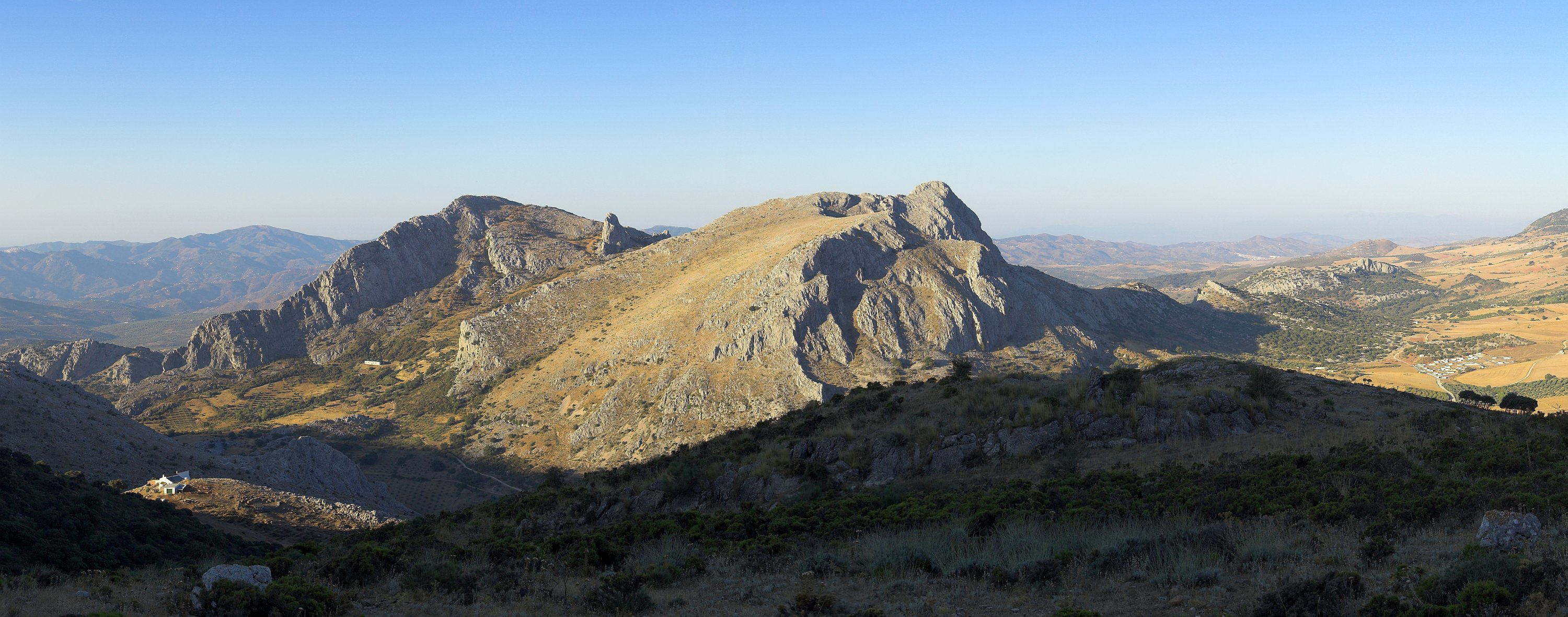
Tajos del Sabar, near Alfarnate

The Baetic System or Betic System (Spanish: Sistema Bético) is one of the main systems of mountain ranges in Spain. Located in the southern and eastern Iberian Peninsula, it is also known as the Cordilleras Béticas (Baetic Mountain Ranges) or Baetic Mountains. The name of the mountain system derives from the ancient Roman region of Baetica, one of the Imperial Roman provinces of ancient Hispania.

== Geography ==
The Baetic System is made up of multiple mountain ranges that reach from western Andalusia to the Region of Murcia, southern Castile-La Mancha and southern Land of Valencia. To the north, the Baetic Ranges are separated from the Meseta Central and the Sierra Morena by the basin of the Guadalquivir. The Iberian System rises north of the eastern part of the Prebaetic System, the northernmost part of the Baetic System. The mountain ranges that are part of this system are generally aligned along a southwest-northeast direction.

The best-known range of the Baetic System is the Sierra Nevada, which contains the Mulhacén, the highest mountain in continental Spain and in the Iberian Peninsula. The Rock of Gibraltar is also considered part of the Baetic System, but not the Cabo de Gata area further east which includes rocks of volcanic origin.

== Geology ==
The Baetic System as a geological feature belongs to a larger orogeny usually called the Gibraltar Arc, which represents the westernmost edge of the Alpine Orogeny. The geodynamic mechanisms responsible for its formation are so far relatively unknown.

Geologically the Rif mountains in Morocco and the Serra de Tramuntana in the island of Mallorca are, respectively, Southwestern and Northeastern extensions of the Baetic System. The Gibraltar Arc geological region follows the Moroccan coast from Oujda in the east to Tangier in the west, then crosses the Strait of Gibraltar and goes east again from Cádiz to Valencia and the Balearic Islands.

== Ecology ==
The Baetic System is home to a number of Mediterranean forests, woodlands, and scrub plant communities, including shrublands, oak woodlands, broadleaf forests, and coniferous forests, which vary with elevation, soils, and topography.

The Baetic System, together with the Rif Mountains of Morocco, which face the Baetic Ranges across the Alboran Sea, is one of the Mediterranean basin's ten biodiversity hotspots, known to ecologists as the Baetic-Rifan complex. The Baetic mountains are home to a rich assemblage of Mediterranean plants, including a number of relict species from the ancient laurel forests, which covered much of the Mediterranean basin millions of years ago when it was more humid.

== Subdivision ==
The Baetic System is divided into the following sub-chains (from south to north):

=== Penibaetic System ===
The Penibaetic System includes the highest point in the peninsula, the 3,478 m high Mulhacén in the Sierra Nevada; other ranges and features are:

- Serranía de Ronda
- Rock of Gibraltar
- Sierra de las Nieves, includes the Sierra de las Nieves National Park
- Sierra Blanca
- Cordillera Antequerana
- Sierra de Tejeda
- Sierra de Almijara
- Sierra de Alhama
- Sierra Nevada
- Sierra de Lújar
- Sierra de la Contraviesa
- Sierra de Cogollos, is included in the Sierra de Huétor and la Alfaguara Natural Park, and includes part of the Cabo de Gata-Níjar Natural Park
- Sierra de Gádor
- Sierra de Baza, includes the Sierra de Baza Natural Park
- Sierra de los Filabres
- Sierra de Alhamilla
- Sierra Espuña
- Sierra Cabrera
- Sierra de las Estancias
- The Surco Intrabético comprises a series of valleys and depressions separating the Penibaetic from the Subbaetic System

=== Subbaetic System ===
The Subbaetic System occupies a central position within the Baetic System. Highest point 2,027 m (6,650 ft) high Peña de la Cruz in Sierra Arana.

- Sierra del Aljibe, includes the Alcornocales Natural Park
- Sierra de Grazalema, includes the Sierra de Grazalema Natural Park
- Sierra de Gibalbín
- Sierras Subbéticas de Córdoba
- Sierra Elvira
- Sierra de Loja
- Sierra de Arana
- Sierra de Cogollos
- Sierra de la Alfaguara
- Sierra de Huétor
- Sierra Sur de Jaén overlapping with the Prebaetic System

=== Prebaetic System ===
The Prebaetic System is the northernmost feature of the whole Baetic System. Highest point 2,382 m high La Sagra.

- Sierra Mágina
- Sierra de la Sagra
- Sierra de Cazorla
- Sierra de Segura
- Sierra de Alcaraz
- Sierra de Castril
- Sierra de la Sagra
- Sierra del Taibilla
- Sierra de María, overlapping with the Penibaetic System; includes the Sierra de María-Los Vélez Natural Park
- Serra Mariola
- Montgó Massif
- Sierra de Bernia
- Penyal d'Ifac

== See also ==
- Geography of Spain
- Geology of the Iberian Peninsula
- Baetic Depression
- Tabernas Desert
