= Beas de Granada =

- town
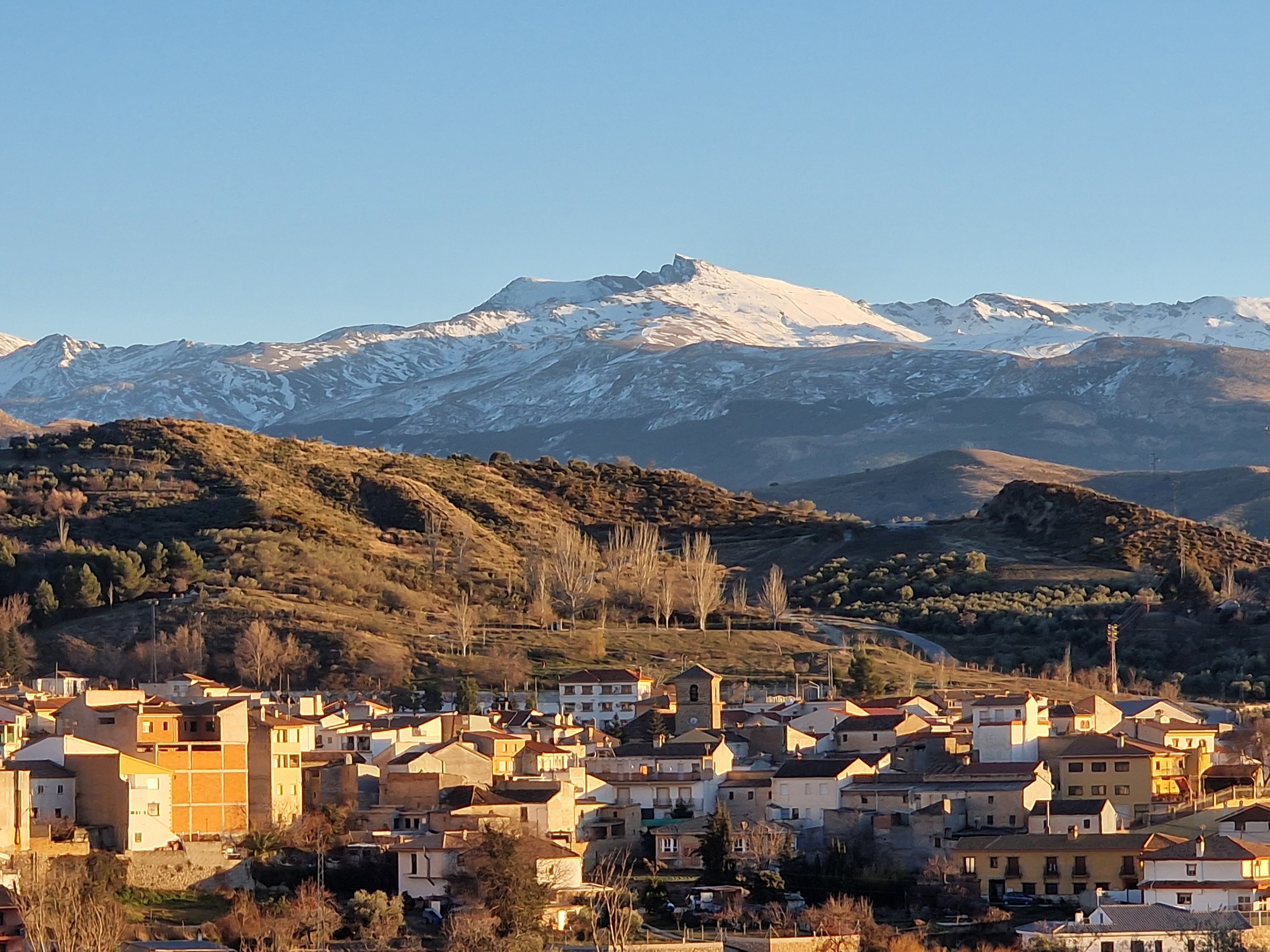

- Flag Coat of arms

- Location in Spain
- Coordinates: 37°13′N 3°29′W
- Country: Spain
- Province: Granada
- Comarca: Vega de Granada

Government
  - Mayor: Manuel Martín Yáñez

Area
  - Total: 23.20 km^{2} (8.96 sq mi)
- Elevation: 1,072 m (3,517 ft)

Population (2025-01-01)
  - Total: 1,007
  - Density: 43.41/km^{2} (112.4/sq mi)
- Demonym: Beatos
- Time zone: UTC+1 (CET)
  - Summer (DST): UTC+2 (CEST)

Beas de Granada is a town located in the province of Granada, southern Spain. As of 2009, the town had a population of 1050 inhabitants. The settlement is at a height of 1072 meters above sea level and therefore has good views of the sierra Nevada. It is within the Parque Natural de la Sierra de Huétor.

== History ==
The town can be traced back to a crossroads during the time of the Romans and even under the Arabs it was only about 20 buildings.

== Notable people ==
Alhambra Nievas the Rugby Union player and referee was born here.

== See also ==
- List of municipalities in Granada
