= Sierra de Huétor =

Mountain range in Granada Province, Andalusia, Spain

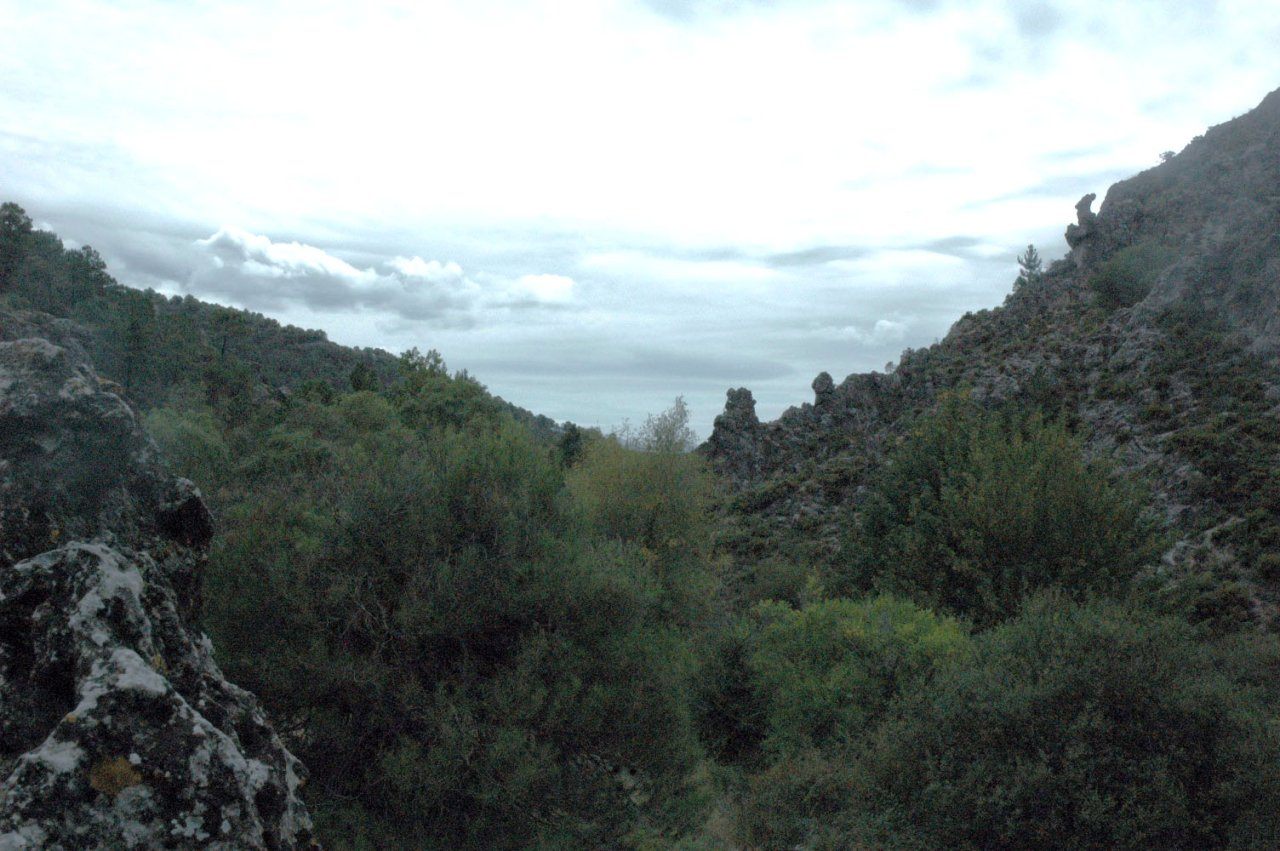
- Valley in the Sierra de Huétor

Highest point
- Peak: Cerro Buenavista
- Elevation: 1,675 m (5,495 ft)
- Coordinates: 37°14′53″N 03°31′56″W

Geography
- Location within Spain
- Location: Granada Province, Andalusia
- Country: Spain
- Parent range: Subbaetic System

Geology
- Rock age(s): Cenozoic and Mesozoic
- Mountain type: Limestone

The Sierra de Huétor is a mountain range of the Baetic System in Granada Province, Andalusia, Spain.

The range is located to the northeast of Granada city. The altitude of the summits ranges between 1,100 metres (3,600 ft) and almost 1,700 metres (5,600 ft) displaying a variety of different climates and habitats. Its highest point is 1,675 m high Cerro Buenavista.

The Moors used one of the mountain springs in the range, the Fuente Grande in Alfácar, to supply water to the Albaicín in Grenada. The water was carried along an irrigation channel named Aynadamar. Traces of more recent history are seen in trenches and fortifications on the Cerro de Maúllo which were used by the fighting armies in Granada during the Spanish Civil War.

== Geography ==
This mountain range includes the deep valleys of the Darro and the Fardes, as well as cliffs, caves, narrow ravines and springs. The mountains are covered in Mediterranean vegetation, with shrubland alternating with holm oak. The range includes part of the municipal term of Huétor Santillán.

=== Protected areas ===
Parts of the Sierra de Huétor, along with the neighboring ranges of Sierra de la Alfaguara, Sierra de Cogollos, Sierra de Diezma, Sierra de Beas, Sierra de la Yedra, as well as the southern part of the Sierra de Arana, is a protected area under the name Sierra de Huétor and la Alfaguara Natural Park (Parque Natural de la Sierra de Huétor y la Alfaguara).

=== Geology ===
Geologically the mountains belong to the Baetic System and are made up mainly of limestone rock from the Cenozoic and Mesozoic.

== See also ==
- Baetic System
- Geology of the Iberian Peninsula
