= Sierra de la Alfaguara =

Mountain range in southern Spain

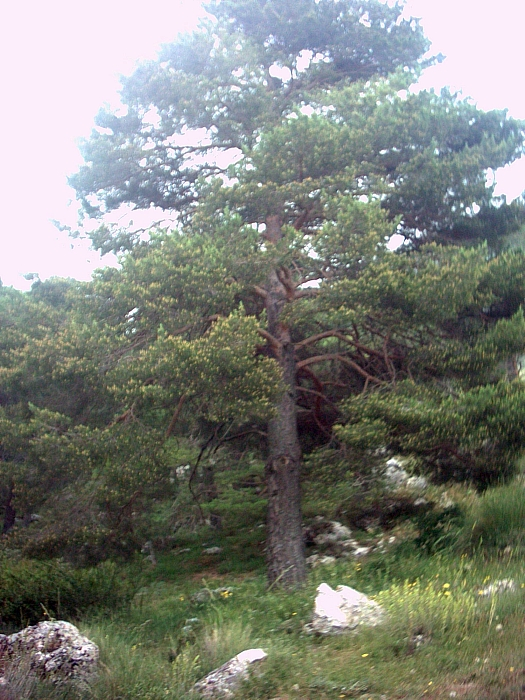
- Scots Pine in the Sierra de la Alfaguara

Highest point
- Coordinates: 37°15′57″N 03°31′49″W

Geography
- Location within Spain
- Location: Granada Province, Andalusia
- Country: Spain
- Parent range: Subbaetic System

Geology
- Rock age(s): Cenozoic and Mesozoic
- Mountain type: Limestone

The Sierra de la Alfaguara is a mountain range in the Cordillera Subbética, beside the Sierra de Huétor in southern Spain. It lies within the Parque Natural de la Sierra de Huétor y la Alfaguara.

== Location ==
The mountain range rises above the town of Alfacar. Scenes from the movie Indiana Jones and the Last Crusade were filmed on the mountain.

The range contains the Arboretum La Alfaguara, formerly a tree nursery that supplied mainly coniferous plants for the reforestation of the entire Sierra de Huétor.

The Darro River rises in this range, a short tributary of the Genil River.

== Environment ==
The original vegetation of the range was largely destroyed by over-exploitation for forestry and livestock raising, and by wildfires. Most of the trees now are species of pine that were used in reforestation. There are also cedars and firs, mixed with native trees such as oak or gall.

Wildlife includes wild boar and abundant herds of goats, which can be seen at surprisingly close range. The mountain is also home to other animal species such as badgers and weasels, as well as bobcat, marten and genet.
