= Calicasas =

Coordinates: 37°17′N 3°37′W

Calicasas, Spain
- Flag Coat of arms

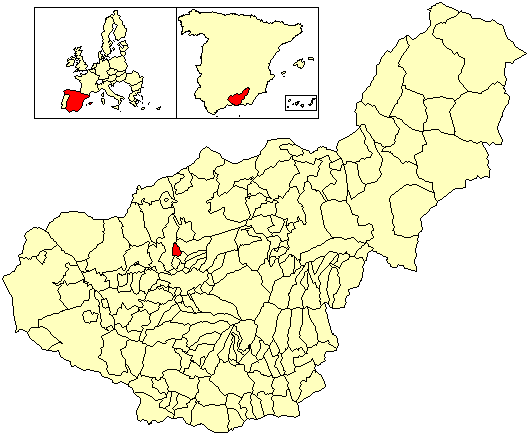
- Location of Calicasas
- Country: Spain
- Province: Granada
- Municipality: Calicasas

Area
  - Total: 11 km^{2} (4.2 sq mi)
- Elevation: 758 m (2,487 ft)

Population (2025-01-01)
  - Total: 687
  - Density: 62/km^{2} (160/sq mi)
- Time zone: UTC+1 (CET)
  - Summer (DST): UTC+2 (CEST)

Calicasas is a city in the province of Granada, Spain. According to the 2005 census (INE), the city has a population of 568 inhabitants.

== See also ==
- List of municipalities in Granada
