= Fuente Vaqueros =

- Municipality
- Flag Coat of arms

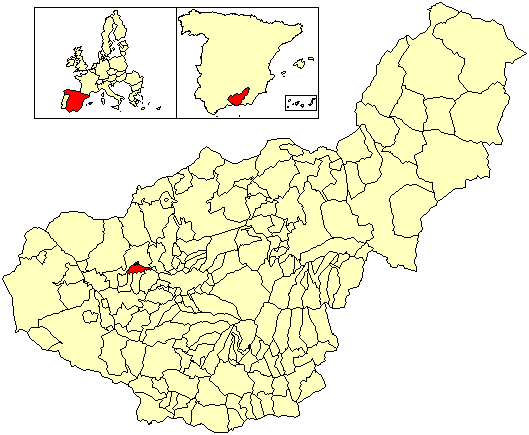
- Location of Fuente Vaqueros

- Location in Spain
- Coordinates: 37°13′0″N 3°46′59″W
- Country: Spain
- Autonomous community: Andalusia
- Province: Granada
- Comarca: Vega de Granada
- Judicial district: Santa Fe
- Commonwealth: Vega Baja de Granada

Government
  - Alcalde (Mayor): José Manuel Molino Alberto (PSOE)

Area
  - Total: 16.01 km^{2} (6.18 sq mi)
- Elevation: 543 m (1,781 ft)

Population (2025-01-01)
  - Total: 4,743
  - Density: 296.3/km^{2} (767.3/sq mi)
- Demonym(s): Fuenterino, -na
- Time zone: UTC+1 (CET)
  - Summer (DST): UTC+2 (CEST)
- Postal code: 18340
- Website: fuente-vaqueros.com

Fuente Vaqueros (Spanish pronunciation: [ˈfwente βaˈkeɾos]) is a farming village in the province of Granada, Spain, lying 17 km west of the city of Granada. Its population was recorded in 2005 as 4,590. Its principal crops are asparagus, olives and apples.

Fuente Vaqueros is known as the birthplace of the 20th-century poet Federico García Lorca; his home now hosts a museum, the Museo Casa Natal Federico García Lorca.

For the feast of Candlemas, the municipality distributes wine and hundreds of kilos of potatoes.

== See also ==
- List of municipalities in Granada
