= Güevéjar =

Coordinates: 37°16′N 3°36′W

Güevéjar, Spain
- city
- Flag Coat of arms

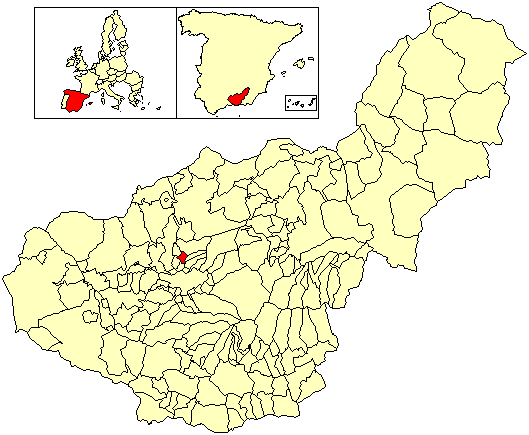
- Location of Güevéjar
- Country: Spain
- Province: Granada
- Municipality: Güevéjar

Area
  - Total: 11 km^{2} (4.2 sq mi)
- Elevation: 900 m (3,000 ft)

Population (2025-01-01)
  - Total: 2,723
  - Density: 250/km^{2} (640/sq mi)
- Time zone: UTC+1 (CET)
  - Summer (DST): UTC+2 (CEST)

Güevéjar is a municipality located in the province of Granada, Spain. According to the 2023 census (INE), the city had a population of 2,546 inhabitants.

== See also ==
- List of municipalities in Granada
