= Darro (river) =

River in Spain

Coordinates: 37°21′N 3°18′W

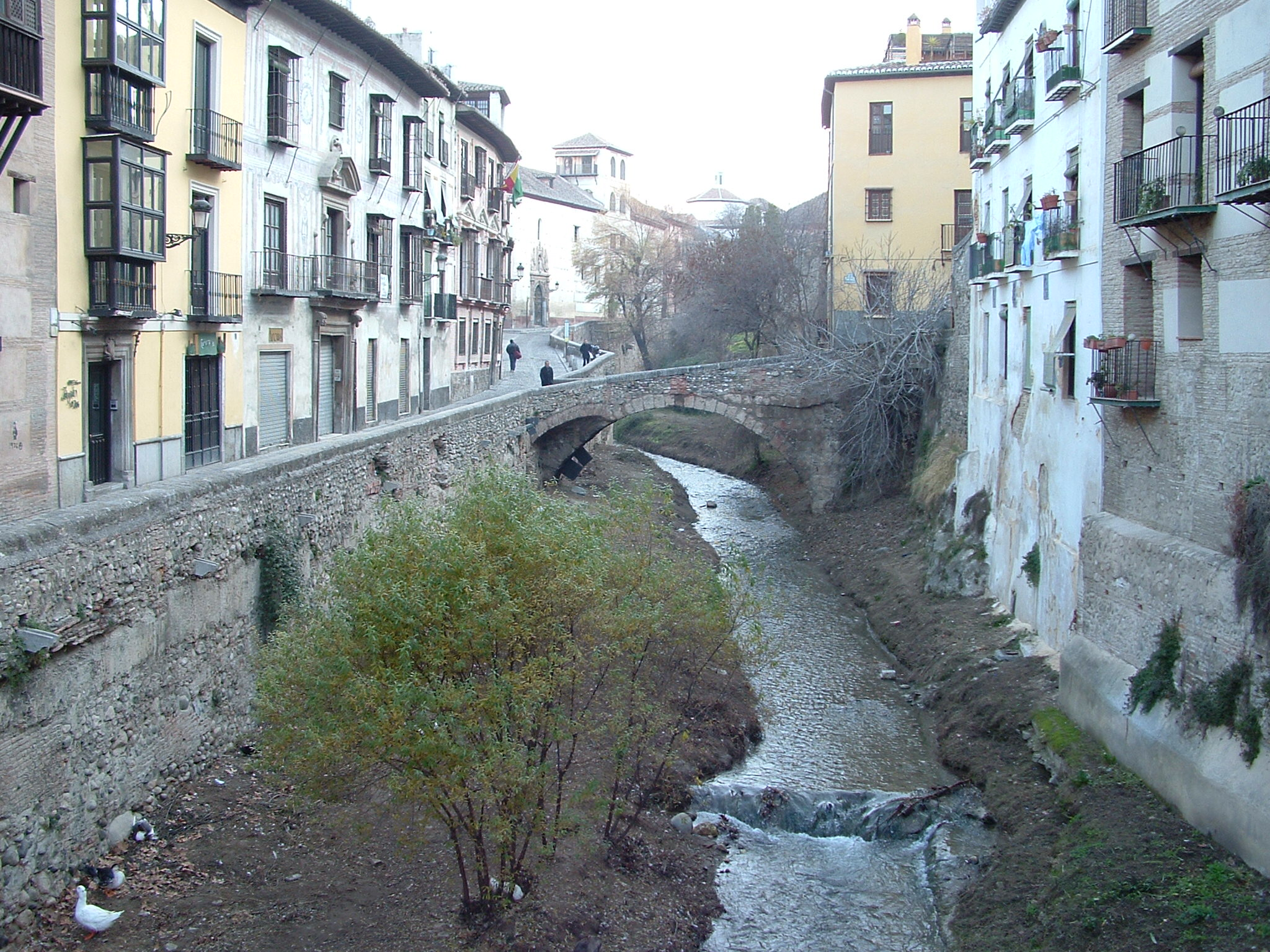
River Darro

The Darro is a river of the province of Granada, Spain. It is a tributary of the Genil. The river was originally named after the Roman word for gold (aurus) because people used to pan for gold on its banks. This name was then changed by the Arabs to Hadarro and after being renamed Dauro by the Christians, it finally became known as Darro. Darro is also the name of a local town.

There are five bridges crossing the Darro: Puente del Aljibillo (Bridge of the Cistern), Puente de las Chirimias (Bridge of the Pipers), Puente de Cabrera (16th century), Puente de Espinosa (16th century). The Darro river supplied water to the Alhambra through a system of aqueducts called 'Acequia Real'.
