= Alfacar =

Coordinates: 37°14′N 3°34′W

Alfacar, Spain
- Flag Coat of arms

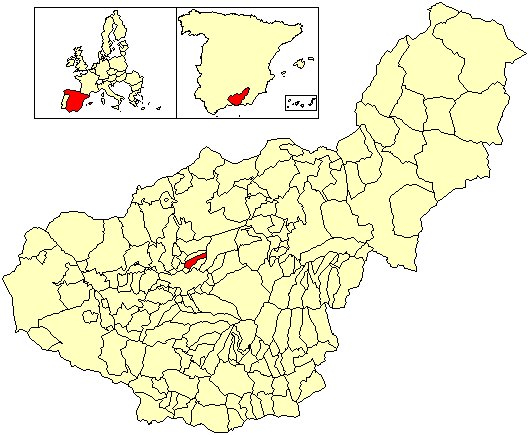
- Location of Alfacar
- Country: Spain
- Autonomous community: Andalusia
- Province: Granada
- Comarca: Vega de Granada
- Municipality: Alfacar

Area
  - Total: 16 km^{2} (6.2 sq mi)
- Elevation: 910 m (2,990 ft)

Population (2025-01-01)
  - Total: 5,834
  - Density: 360/km^{2} (940/sq mi)
- Time zone: UTC+1 (CET)
  - Summer (DST): UTC+2 (CEST)
- Website: www.ayuntamientodealfacar.es

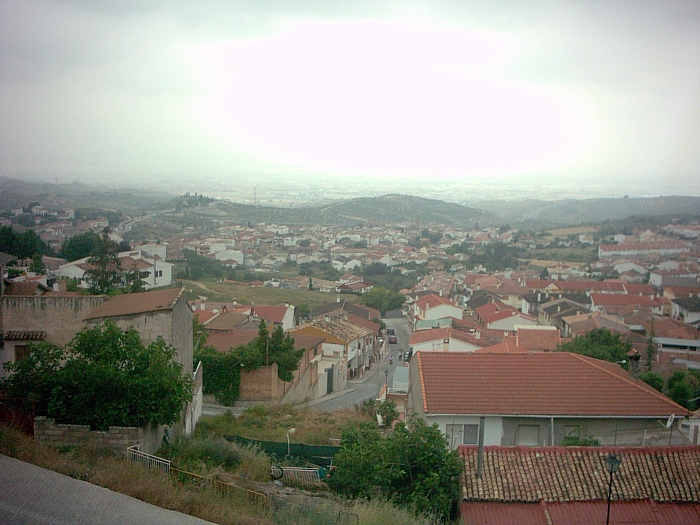
Alfacar

Alfacar is a historic town approximately 8 kilometres (5.0 mi) from the city of Granada, in the autonomous Spanish region of Andalusia. In the 2005 census, INE reported its population as 5107 inhabitants. The town is on the edge of the Sierra de Huétor Natural Park and is in a region of intensive olive production. The town is 920 metres (3,020 ft) above sea level, but the local fossil record contains marine molluscs that show the profound geological forces that have shaped the region.

The area has been occupied by humans since prehistory. A very important neolithic site - la Barranca de Las Majolicas - is within the town, and human remains, decorated ceramics, and bone tools and ornaments have been found there. Between 711 and 1492, most of Spain was governed by a series of Muslim dynasties and monarchs. We do not fully understand the origins of the name Alfacar, but in this era the Arabic name "al-Fajjar" (´the house of the potter´) was first applied to the settlement. The town was a summer retreat for the Muslim Zirite kings (1010-1090). There are few visible architectural relics from this time. The Arabs adapted the Fuente Grande to channel its waters to Granada, and the old heart of the town retains the structure of an Arab settlement.

The Christian Reconquest of Spain culminated on 2 January 1492 when Boabdil, the last Muslim king of Granada, surrendered to the Catholic Monarchs Ferdinand and Isabella. Thirteen days before, the Muslim population of Alfacar capitulated to the advancing forces. History shows that the Arab inhabitants of Alfacar continued living in relative peace under the new regime and did not participate in the subsequent unsuccessful uprising of the "Moriscos". However, this did not prevent their expulsion from the Iberian Peninsula in 1579 during the reign of Philip II, after which Alfacar was repopulated by Castilian Spanish families. An important building that dates from this period is the Church of the Assumption of Our Lady (La Iglesia de la Asunción de Nuestra Señora), built on the site of a former church that was destroyed in 1557 and in turn was situated over the foundations of a former mosque.

The town is most famous for the death of poet and dramatist, Federico García Lorca, born 1898 in nearby (23 kilometres (14 mi)) Fuente Vaqueros. On 19 August 1936, at the beginning of the Spanish Civil War, Nationalist forces detained him. He was subsequently shot during the early morning at a location between Alfacar and the neighbouring village of Víznar. The circumstances of his assassination and the location of his grave remain a controversy.

The town of Alfacar has grown considerably from its ancient centre. It has recently suffered from the economic crisis and many construction projects remain unfinished, while various businesses have been forced to close. There is evidence of regeneration with new shops and restaurants opening, and Alfacar is renowned throughout the region for its famous bakeries which probably date back to Arab times and provide many shops in Granada with fresh daily bread. Alfacar is well provided with shops, a medical centre, theatre, sports centre and many other facilities. However, what remains of the historic centre of the town is under serious threat from neglect and redevelopment. An example is the 15th-16th century Arco de Somera, an ancient store room situated above an arched alleyway, which is urgently in need of stabilization.

The countryside around Alfacar abounds with wildlife including Iberian ibex, wildcat and wild boar, and in spring one can find many species of orchids, bulbs and other wild flowers. The adjacent protected region of Sierra de Huétor has an excellent visitors centre and is a popular destination for walkers. There are extensive regenerated pine forests, large areas of native evergreen oaks and the rare Spanish conifer, Abies pinsapo, has been reintroduced here. Alfacar is also famous for the blue butterfly Lysandra bellargus ssp. alfacariensis, that was first identified in the area.

== See also ==
- List of municipalities in Granada

== See also ==
- Bread of Alfacar
