= Valle de Lecrín =

Coordinates: 36°59′N 3°34′W

Lecrin Valley Valle de Lecrín (Spanish)
- Comarca
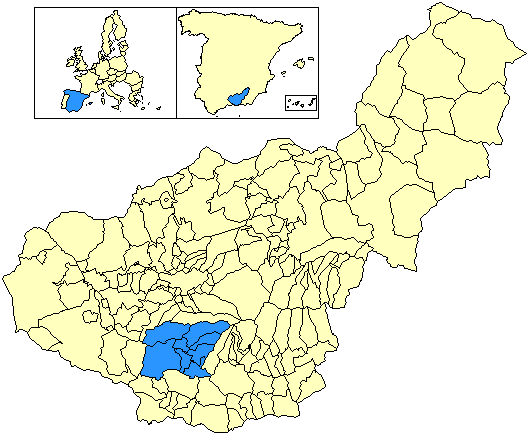
- Location in the province of Granada and Andalusia.
- Country: Spain
- Autonomous community: Andalusia
- Province: Granada
- Capital: Dúrcal
- Municipalities: List: Albuñuelas, Dúrcal, Lecrín, Nigüelas, Padul, El Pinar, El Valle, Villamena

Population (2023) (Note: Estimate at 1 January 2023. National Statistics Institute (Spain))
  - Total: 23,729
- Time zone: UTC+1 (CET)
  - Summer (DST): UTC+2 (CEST)

The Lecrin Valley (Spanish: Valle de Lecrín, Spanish pronunciation: [ˈβaʎe ðe leˈkɾiŋ]) is a comarca in the center-south part of the province of Granada, Andalusia, southern Spain. This territory borders the Vega de Granada to the north, the Alpujarra Granadina to the east, the Costa Tropical to the south, and the Alhama to the west. This comarca was established in 2003 by the Government of Andalusia.

Lecrin derived from Arabic Iqlim, meaning "gateway": this refers to a small area of land situated between the villages of Mondújar and Talará, which controlled the access to the vast coastal areas of sugar production in Moorish times.

The Lecrin Valley consists of eight municipalities, of which the most populous is Padul, and the largest is Albuñuelas, the latter being also the least populated. On the other hand, the municipality with the smallest area is Villamena. Its traditional and historical capital is the town of Dúrcal.

Apart from Dúrcal and Padul, agriculture and farming remain the principal occupation with pine, citrus, almond, olive and grape as the main crops. In more recent times, it has become a destination for Spanish and international holidaymakers looking for a quiet holiday amongst the orchards, but with easy reach to the Moorish city of Granada and the Costa Tropical. It is also an increasingly popular destination for walkers, bird watchers, cyclists and artists.

The Lecrin Valley is known for its verdant landscape (due to the melt-water run off from Sierra Nevada) and its views to lake Beznar and up to the Sierra Nevada mountains, its walks, birdlife and spring colours.

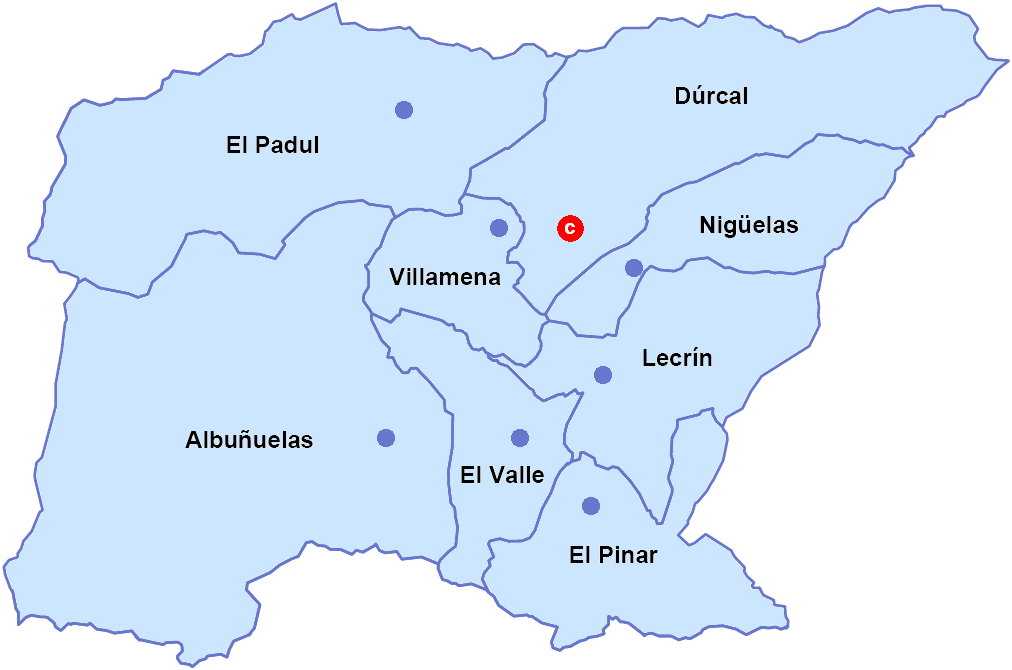
Map of the Lecrin Valley.

== Municipalities ==
This comarca consists of the following municipalities:

Municipality	Area (km^{2})	Population (2023) (Note: Estimate at 1 January 2023. National Statistics Institute (Spain))	Density (/km^{2})	Council (2011)	Capital	Parishes
Albuñuelas	140.05	785	5.61	PP	Albuñuelas	La Loma
Dúrcal	76.63	7,233	94.39	PP	Dúrcal	Marchena
Lecrín	40.49	2,258	55.77	PSOE	Talará	Acequias, Béznar, Chite, Mondújar, Murchas and Peloteos
Nigüelas	30.93	1,228	39.70	PSOE	Nigüelas	–
Padul	89.15	9,436	105.84	PSOE	Padul	El Puntal
El Pinar	38.01	867	22.81	PP	Pinos del Valle	Acebuches and Ízbor
El Valle	25.84	936	36.22	PSOE	Restábal	Melegís y Saleres
Villamena	20.18	986	48.86	PSOE	Cozvíjar	Cónchar
Total	461.28	23,729	51.44			

== Road access ==
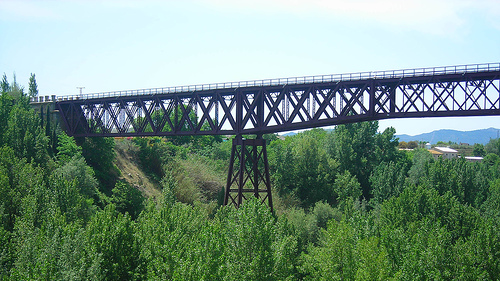
Tin Bridge, in Dúrcal.

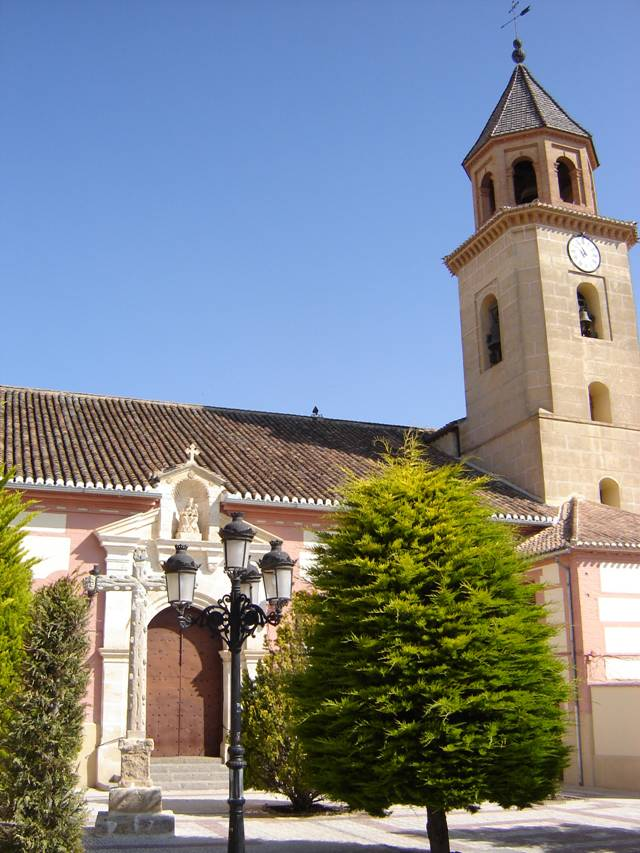
Church of Santa María la Mayor, in Padul.

Halfway between the city of Granada and the Costa Tropical, this comarca is traversed from North to South by the A-44 (Bailén-Motril) motorway, which serves all municipalities with the following ways out:

- 144: Padul, Otívar.
- 153: Cónchar, Cozvíjar, Dúrcal, Albuñuelas.
- 157: Dúrcal, Nigüelas.
- 159: Lecrín, El Valle.
- 164: Pinos del Valle, Lanjarón, Béznar
- 169: Ízbor-Acebuches.

Other notable roads are: N-323, an old road that connected Bailén with Motril, connecting the cities of Jaén and Granada with the coast; A-4050, popularly known as Carretera de la Cabra, which links the mountain port of El Suspiro del Moro with Almuñécar to the west; and A-348, which connects the entire Alpujarra Granadina with the highway.
