= Padul =

- Municipality
- Padul
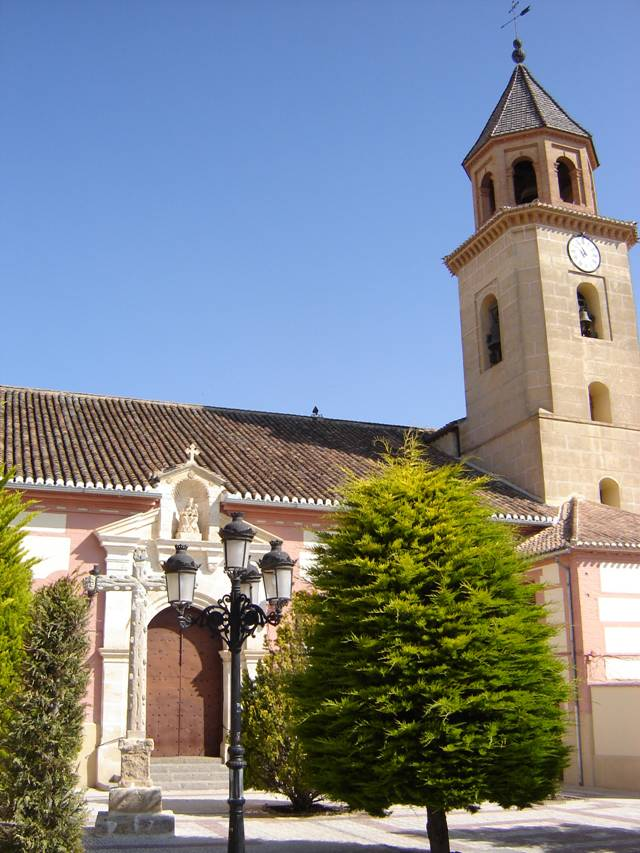
- Parish church of the Virgin Mary

- Coat of arms

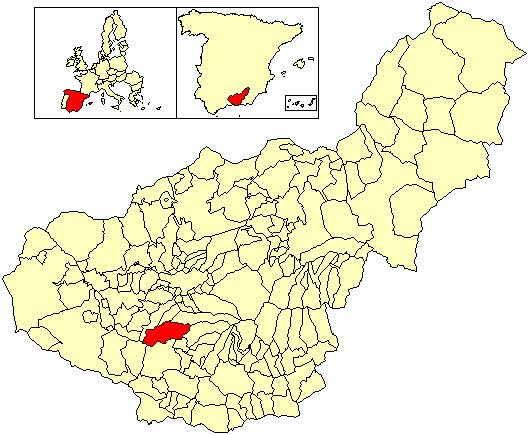
- Location of Padul

- Location in Spain
- Coordinates: 37°1′28″N 3°37′36″W
- Country: Spain
- Autonomous community: Andalusia
- Province: Granada
- Comarca: Valle de Lecrín
- Judicial district: Granada

Government
  - Alcalde: Manuel Alarcón Pérez (2007) (PSOE)

Area
  - Total: 89 km^{2} (34 sq mi)
- Elevation: 744 m (2,441 ft)

Population (2025-01-01)
  - Total: 9,667
  - Density: 110/km^{2} (280/sq mi)
- Demonym(s): Paduleño, -ña.
- Time zone: UTC+1 (CET)
  - Summer (DST): UTC+2 (CEST)
- Postal code: 18640

Padul is a municipality of south-eastern Spain, in the province of Granada, within the comarca of el Valle de Lecrín. The population in 2008 was 8,440 inhabitants. This town is situated 13 km at the south of the city of Granada. Its altitude is 744 meters above the sea level.

== Geography ==
=== Borders ===
Padul borders on Alhendín, Villa de Otura and Dílar to the north, ; Dúrcal and Villamena to the east; Albuñuelas to the south and Jayena to the west.

=== Natural environment ===
- Padul's wetland : One of the most important wetlands in south-eastern Spain, recently included in the Ramsar Convention. It has the greatest peatland of the Mediterranean basin and it has also several threatened species.

== History ==
=== Etymology ===
The origin of the name of Padul comes from the Roman era, deriving from the Latin word palus-paludis and exactly from its accusative case paludem, which means wetland or bog, clearly referring to Padul's wetland.

Due to the lack of known manuscripts talking about the name of the town along a period of time ranging several centuries, the phases of evolution of the Latin word are unknown, as well as the preceding definite article "El". In relation to this point, two plausible possibilities are proposed: (1) The article could have appeared directly from the Latin word ille, which originated the definite articles in all Romance languages. (2) The article could have appeared later with the Arabic article al. Regardless this controversy, during the Nasrid period, Ibn al-Khatib wrote the word "Al-Badul" (in Arabic spelling), with "B" because "P" does not exist in Arabic, although probably people used the sound "P".

The modern name of Padul appears in the first manuscripts written in Spanish language in the 16th century. Among these manuscripts, the most important are the Parochial Archive and the Book of Surveying written in 1571. In the latter is possible to read this sentence: ...que era de vecinos moriscos del dicho lugar Padul....

In the 20th century, when the road signs started to be used, most of them were settled with the name of Padul without article, which has caused an important controversy about the real name of the town.

Towards the end of the 20th century, a cultural movement formed by several writers and History teachers of the town proposed to the town council to restore officially the whole name of the town. The result of that cultural movement took place on 18 December 2000, when the Town Council chose the name Padul as the official of the town. The proposal was accepted by unanimity of all the town councillors.

=== Prehistory (Origins) ===
In the municipality, numerous traces pertaining to different prehistoric periods have been found. Thus, in the land of the ancient wetland, close to a peat quarry, fossilized remains of Mammuthus of the Middle Pleistocene were found in 1982. A good example of a tusk is exposed in the Sciences Park of Granada. The most ancient tracks of human presence match with the Middle Paleolithic, including projectile points and racloirs of the Mousterian culture, which suggest the presence of settlements of Neanderthals near the wetland and close to important caves of the municipality. Neolithic remains are more abundant and are represented by vessels, bracelets, domestic and farming tools, etc.

== Culture ==
=== Monuments ===
- Casa Grande (16th century): Palace of civil character. This building served as a scene location for the film The Long Duel starring Yul Brynner.
- Church of Santa María la Mayor (16th - 18th centuries)
- Chapel of Saint Sebastian (18th century).
- Source of the five pipes (Lavadero) (s. XVI-XIX).
- Roman road: The remains of an ancient Roman road that connected the cities of Ilíberis (Granada) and Sexi (Almuñécar), located in the place known as Los Molinos.

=== Fiestas ===
The afternoon of 19 January, the people of Padul go to the mountains that surround the town in order to look for firewood and aromatic plants. Then they make big pyres during the procession of Saint Sebastian between the chapel and the church. The following day, 20 January, there is another procession with more huge pyres and gunshots. These days, people sing the local hymn of Saint Sebastian.

The carnival is a traditional feasting period, where many disguised people sing humorous and satirical songs. These consist mainly of faux-tales about how their parents, or grandparents, committed various acts of petty theft and adultery.

Within the Holy Week, the procession of "Jesus Christ's Burial" in the Good Friday is of special relevance. This procession relates with 10 pasos (moving sculptures) all the Passion.

The Fair is celebrated the last weekend of September.

Food, Agriculture and Tourism fair of the comarcas of Valle de Lecrín, Temple and Costa Interior is celebrated between the 6th and 8 December. At the same time is celebrated the day of wine and the day of pig slaughter.

== See also ==
- List of municipalities in Granada
