= Monachil =

- municipality
- Flag Coat of arms

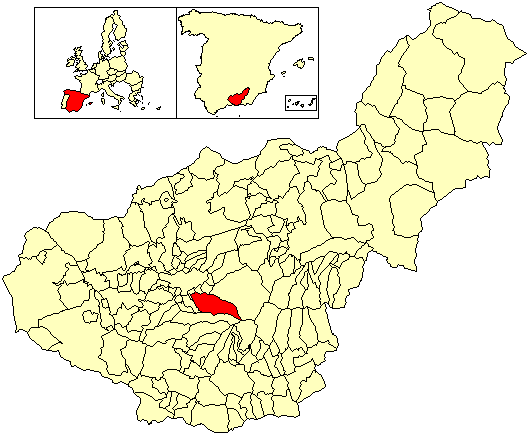
- Location of Monachil
- Coordinates: 37°07′55″N 3°32′20″W
- Country: Spain
- Province: Granada
- Municipality: Monachil

Area
  - Total: 90.13 km^{2} (34.80 sq mi)
- Elevation: 792 m (2,598 ft)

Population (2025-01-01)
  - Total: 8,664
  - Density: 96.13/km^{2} (249.0/sq mi)
- Website: http://www.monachil.es/

Monachil is a municipality in the province of Granada, Spain. As of 2018, it has a population of 7,826 inhabitants. It lies around 8 km from the city of Granada. It borders the municipalities of Huétor Vega, Cenes de la Vega, Pinos Genil, Güéjar Sierra, Dílar, La Zubia and Cájar.

Within the municipality of Monachil there are three distinct population centres: the old village, often referred to as Monachil Pueblo, the newer Barrio de la Vega and Pradollano, the resort village at the Sierra Nevada Ski Station. The ski station hosted the Alpine World Ski Championships in 1996, the 2015 Winter Universiade, and the FIS Freestyle Ski and Snowboarding World Championships 2017.

The name Monachil comes from the Arabic منستير (monastir), a word of Greek origin meaning "monastery".

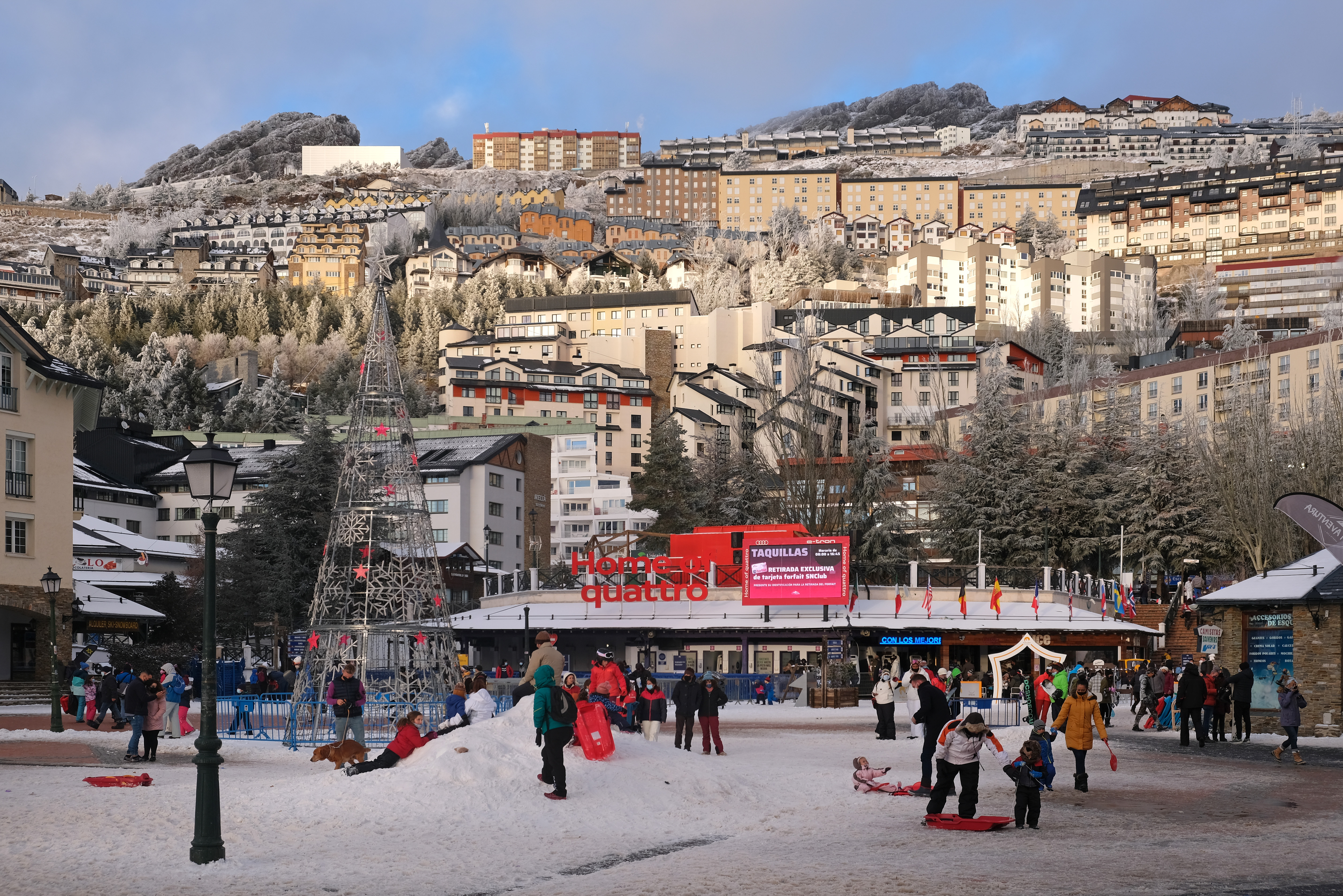
Pradollano, Sierra Nevada, Monachil.

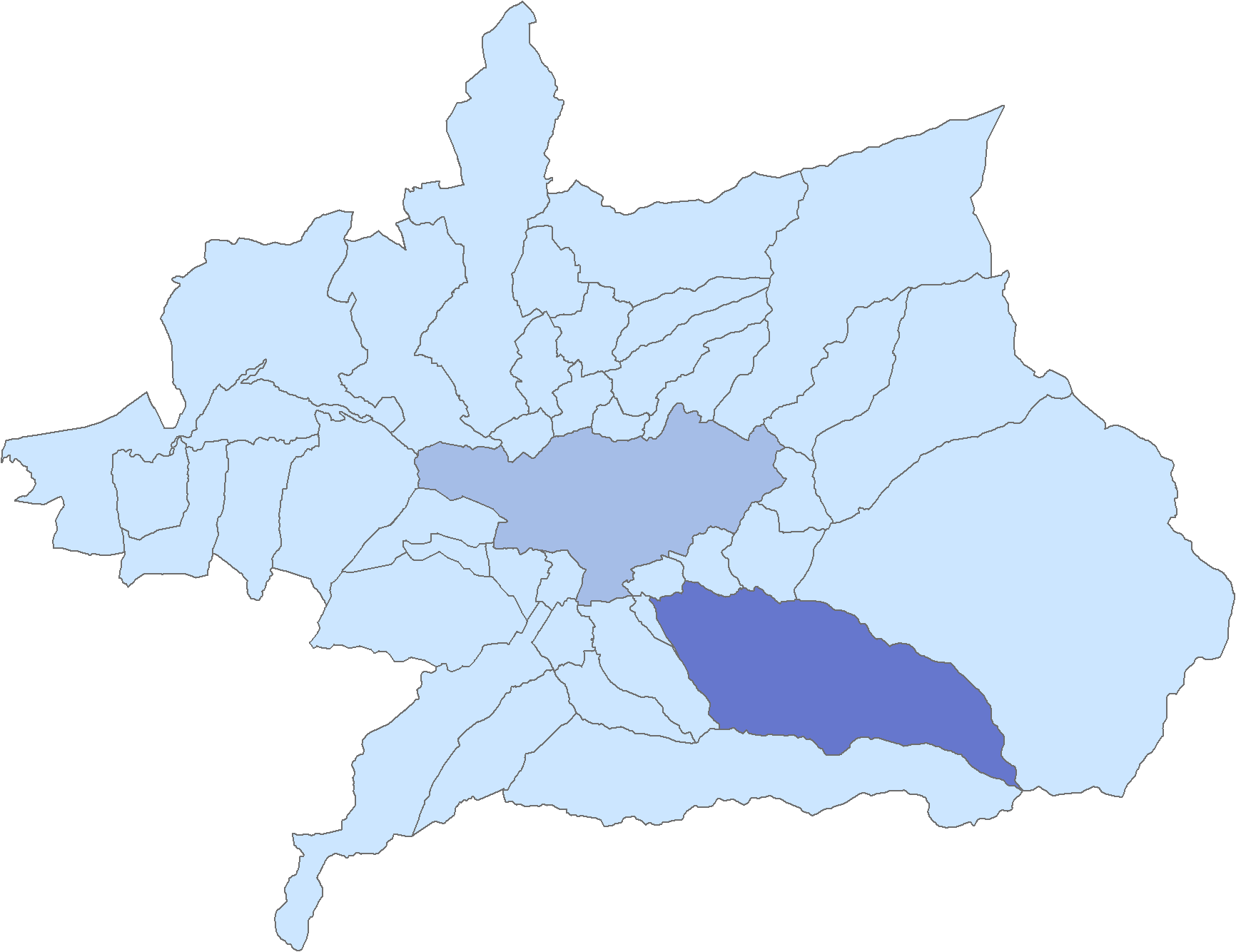
Location of Monachil (in dark blue) relative to the Vega de Granada; The city of Granada is shown in lighter blue.

== Notable people ==
- Adrián Butzke, footballer, born 1999.

== See also ==
- List of municipalities in Granada
