= Pino =

Pino or Piño may refer to:

== People ==
=== Surname ===
- Danny Pino (born 1974), American actor
- Domenico Pino (1760–1826), Italian general of the Napoleonic Wars
- Fernando Solanas (1936–2020), aka "Pino" Solanas, Argentine filmmaker
- Frank J. Pino (1909–2007), New York politician and judge
- Jose Moya del Pino (1891–1969), Spanish-born American painter, muralist, and educator
- Juan Pablo Pino (born 1987), Colombian football player
- Nicolas Pino (1819–1896), American Civil War officer
- Yéremy Pino (born 2002), Spanish footballer

=== Given name ===
- Pino Caballero Gil (born 1968), Spanish computer scientist
- Pino Cabras (born 1968), Italian politician
- Pino Colizzi (1937–2026), Italian actor and voice actor
- Pino Daeni (1939–2010), Italian artist
- Pino Daniele (1955–2015), Italian musician
- Pino Palladino (born 1957), Welsh-Italian musician
- Pino Presti (born 1943), Italian musician

== Places ==
- Pino, California, former name of Loomis
- Pino, Haute-Corse, a town in France
- Pino d'Asti, a municipality in the Province of Asti, Italy
- Pino sulla Sponda del Lago Maggiore, a village and municipality in the Province of Varese, Italy
- Pino Torinese, a municipality in the Metropolitan City of Turin in the Italian region Piedmont

== Other ==
- PINO, an open humanoid robot platform
- Pino, the name of a bird muppet on the Dutch children's television series Sesamstraat
- PINO, President In Name Only, a pejorative term for a U.S. President considered insufficient in fulfilling oath to uphold the laws and constitution
- Pino (doll), a character in Namco's 1986 arcade game, Toy Pop
- Pino, a Swedish children's book, or film series, and the titular fictional protagonist
- Pino Petto, a Robotic fictional character from Silent Night, Deadly Night 5: The Toy Maker, played by Brian Bremer
- Nissan Pino, a kei car produced by Nissan from 2007 to 2010
- an abbreviation for Phthalimido-N-oxyl, a radical derived from N-Hydroxyphthalimide

== See also ==
- El Pinar (disambiguation)
- El Pino (disambiguation)
- Pinho, a surname
- Pinos (disambiguation)
- Pinot (disambiguation)
