= 2016 Vuelta a Andalucía =

UCI Europe Tour

Race details
- Dates: 17–21 February 2016
- Stages: 5
- Distance: 694.6 km (431.6 mi)
- Winning time: 17hr 41' 10"

Results
| Jersey awarded to the overall winner | Winner | Alejandro Valverde (ESP) | (Movistar Team) |
| | Second | Tejay van Garderen (USA) | (BMC Racing Team) |
| | Third | Bauke Mollema (NED) | (Trek-Segafredo) |
| Jersey awarded to the points classification winner | Points | Ben Swift (GBR) | (Team Sky) |
| Jersey awarded to the mountains classification winner | Mountains | Damiano Caruso (ITA) | (BMC Racing Team) |
| Jersey awarded to the sprints classification winner | Sprints | Jérôme Baugnies (BEL) | (Wanty–Groupe Gobert) |

The 62nd edition of the Vuelta a Andalucía, also known as the Ruta del Sol, was held in Andalusia, in southern Spain, from 17 to 21 February 2016. Spanish rider Alejandro Valverde won the event after winning the final mountain-top stage; his fourth overall victory in the Vuelta a Andalucía.

The Vuelta a Andalucía is a road cycling stage race, rated as a 2.1 event of the 2016 UCI Europe Tour. Chris Froome, the previous year's champion, did not to defend his title. The race was run over five stages. The first three stages were moderately hilly and won by sprinters; the fourth was an individual time trial; the fifth and final stage had a summit finish atop the climb of Peñas Blancas.

== Course ==
=== Race summary ===
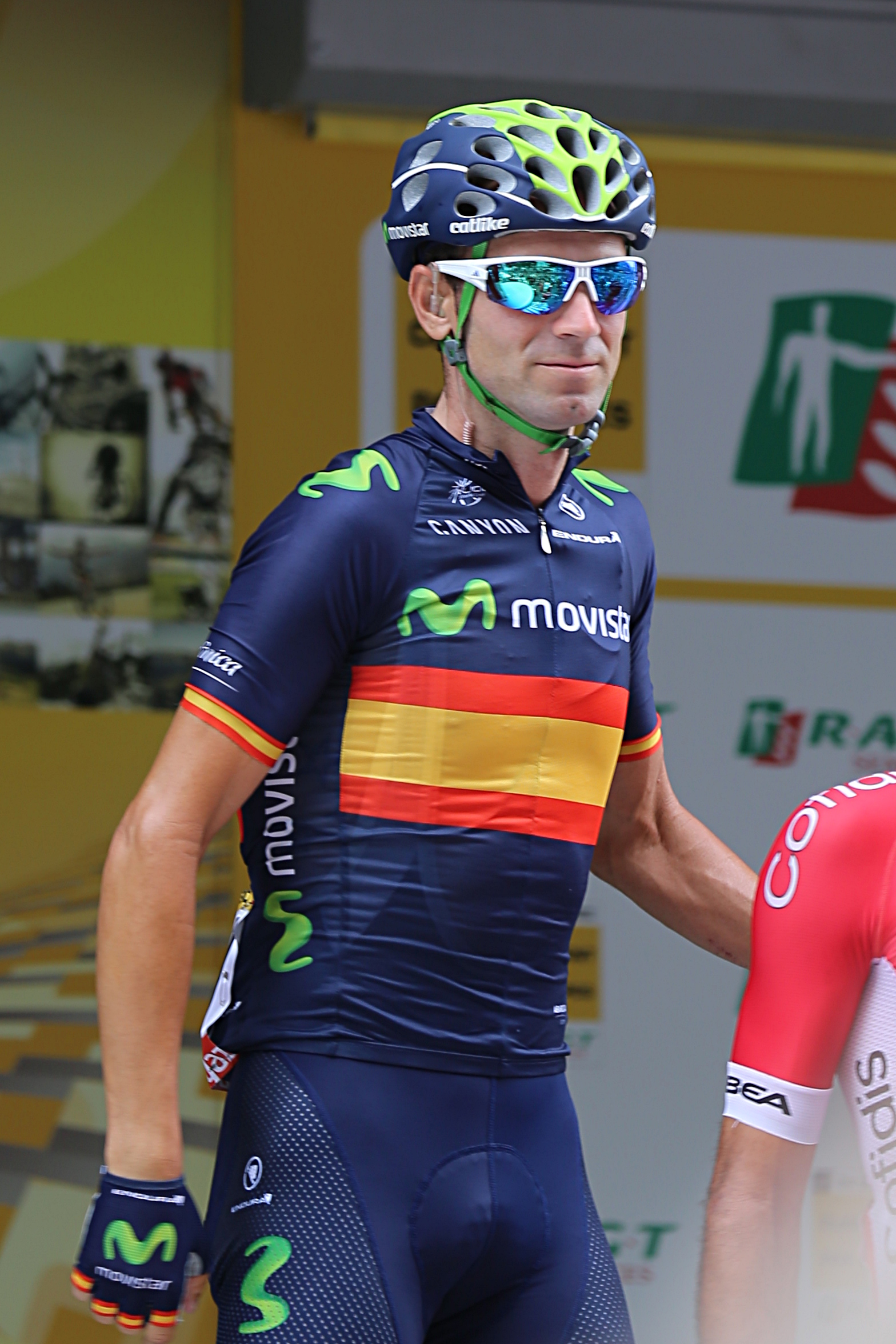
Alejandro Valverde won his fourth overall victory in the Vuelta a Andalucía.

The race comprised five stages, increasing in difficulty. The first, relatively flat stage, was won by Daniele Bennati in a sprint in the streets of Seville. The second ended with a third-category climb, followed by a technical descent into Córdoba, won by sprinter Nacer Bouhanni. The third stage featured several climbs, ending with a flat run-in to Padul, won by Oscar Gatto in the sprint of a select group. The final two stages were decisive in the general classification. The fourth stage, a 21-kilometre (13 mi) individual time trial with a technical opening half and a climb at the finish, was won by Tejay van Garderen. The final stage ended with the climb of Peñas Blancas, a 14-kilometre (8.7 mi) climb near Estepona at an average gradient of 8%. Alejandro Valverde, in eight place after the time trial, attacked from afar to overhaul van Garderen and take the overall victory.

=== Stage schedule ===
| Stage | Date | Route | Distance | Type | Winner |
|---|---|---|---|---|---|
| 1 | 17 February | Almonaster la Real to Sevilla | 165.2 km (103 mi) | Hilly stage | Daniele Bennati (ITA) |
| 2 | 18 February | Palomares del Río to Córdoba | 186.3 km (116 mi) | Hilly stage | Nacer Bouhanni (FRA) |
| 3 | 19 February | Monachil to Padul | 157.9 km (98 mi) | Hilly stage | Oscar Gatto (ITA) |
| 4 | 20 February | Alhaurín de la Torre | 21 km (13 mi) | Individual time trial | Tejay van Garderen (USA) |
| 5 | 21 February | San Roque to Peñas Blancas | 164.2 km (102 mi) | Mountain stage | Alejandro Valverde (ESP) |

== Classifications ==
Classification Leadership Table
| Stage | Winner | General Classification | Mountains Classification | Sprints Classification | Points Classification | Teams Classification |
|---|---|---|---|---|---|---|
| 1 | Daniele Bennati | Daniele Bennati | Imanol Estevez | Jérôme Baugnies | Daniele Bennati | Cofidis |
| 2 | Nacer Bouhanni | Nacer Bouhanni | Imanol Estevez | Jérôme Baugnies | Nacer Bouhanni | Cofidis |
| 3 | Oscar Gatto | Ben Swift | Damiano Caruso | Jérôme Baugnies | Ben Swift | Tinkoff |
| 4 | Tejay van Garderen | Tejay van Garderen | Damiano Caruso | Jérôme Baugnies | Ben Swift | BMC Racing Team |
| 5 | Alejandro Valverde | Alejandro Valverde | Damiano Caruso | Jérôme Baugnies | Ben Swift | BMC Racing Team |
| Final | | Alejandro Valverde | Damiano Caruso | Jérôme Baugnies | Ben Swift | BMC Racing Team |

== Teams ==
24 teams were invited to take part in the 2016 race. Ten of these were UCI WorldTeams; ten were UCI Professional Continental teams; and four were UCI Continental teams. Each team lined up seven riders - totaling 168 riders.

UCI WorldTeams

- Team Sky
- Tinkoff
- Movistar Team
- Trek–Segafredo
- Lotto–Soudal
- Team Giant–Alpecin
- IAM Cycling
- LottoNL–Jumbo
- BMC Racing Team
- Team Dimension Data

UCI Professional Continental teams

- Caja Rural–Seguros RGA
- Direct Énergie
- Cofidis
- CCC–Sprandi–Polkowice
- Funvic Soul Cycles–Carrefour
- Roompot–Oranje Peloton
- Wanty–Groupe Gobert
- Gazprom–RusVelo
- Topsport Vlaanderen–Baloise
- Southeast–Venezuela

Participating teams

- Burgos BH
- Matrix Powertag
- Euskadi Basque Country–Murias
- Stradalli–Bike Aid
