= Dúrcal =

Coordinates: 36°59′N 3°34′W

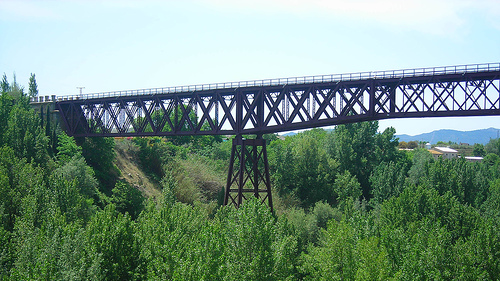
- Lata Bridge, in Dúrcal

- Coat of arms

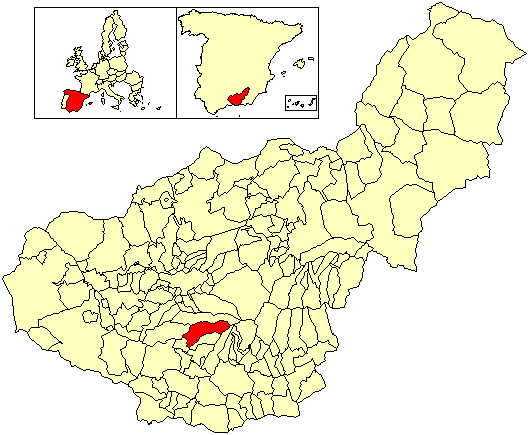

- Location in Spain.
- Country: Spain
- Province: Granada
- Comarca: Lecrín Valley

Area
  - Total: 76 km^{2} (29 sq mi)
- Elevation: 782 m (2,566 ft)

Population (2025-01-01)
  - Total: 7,234
  - Density: 95/km^{2} (250/sq mi)
- Website: www.adurcal.com

Dúrcal with a population of 7,286 (2012) is a Spanish municipality located in the north-eastern part of the Valle de Lecrín in the Province of Granada, one of the 51 entities that make up the metropolitan area of Granada. It borders the municipalities of Dílar, Lanjarón, Nigüelas, Villamena, and the Padul. Other nearby towns are Padul and Mondújar. The council consists of durqueño nuclei Dúrcal, which is the capital district Lecrín Valley, and Marchena. Much of its township is located in the Sierra Nevada National Park.

== History ==
Evidence of inhabitants have been found from 4500 BC by way of archaeological finds from the Neolithic age - utensils, vessels, polishing stones and the like. Later findings along the Río Dúrcal indicated the area as a natural passageway between the Mediterranean coast, La Alpujarra and the Granada area.

Among the early settlers were those from the Middle East in search of raw metals, followed by the Phoenicians, Greeks, Carthaginians, and Romans. It is the presence of the Roman civilization here that has yielded the majority of artifacts which are housed in several museums in the surrounding area.

Between the Roman and Arab eras, not much is known about the area. But from the 8th to 15th centuries during the Moorish reign, the area became a bustling agricultural center protected by forts and walled areas that oversaw the valley's passageways. The villages therein were dedicated to the growth of citrus fruits and mulberry trees which were necessary for silk production. It is from this time that the village names evolved, such as Dúrcal meaning Durkar in Arabic but whose significance is unknown. Also during this era were built numerous buildings of architectural importance.

In 1491, during the start of the reconquest of the area by the Catholic Monarchs, all that had been built in the Lecrín Valley was completely destroyed. By 1492, Granada had been conquered and the Moorish era came slowly to an end. After the expulsion of the Moors that ended in 1571, Dúrcal's economic life came to a halt with the cessation of their agricultural and crafts and its population dwindled to a mere 320 inhabitants in 1587 and 160 in 1730. During the 19th and 20th centuries the population again grew albeit slowly, and the agricultural trade was revived. Over the last generation, Dúrcal has grown in diversified ways, developing economies in industrial and service areas, as well as more recently attracting rural tourism. A new future is being written for this town with a long history of upheavals.

The singer and actress Rocío Dúrcal drew the name of this town at random from a map of Spain, which she would subsequently use as her stage name. She was therefore declared an adoptive daughter of Dúrcal and the city council named a street in her honor and erected a statue of her in the main square, Plaza España.

== See also ==
- List of municipalities in Granada
