= Sierra Nevada National Park (Spain) =

National park in Andalusia, Spain

- Parque nacional de Sierra Nevada
- IUCN category II (national park)
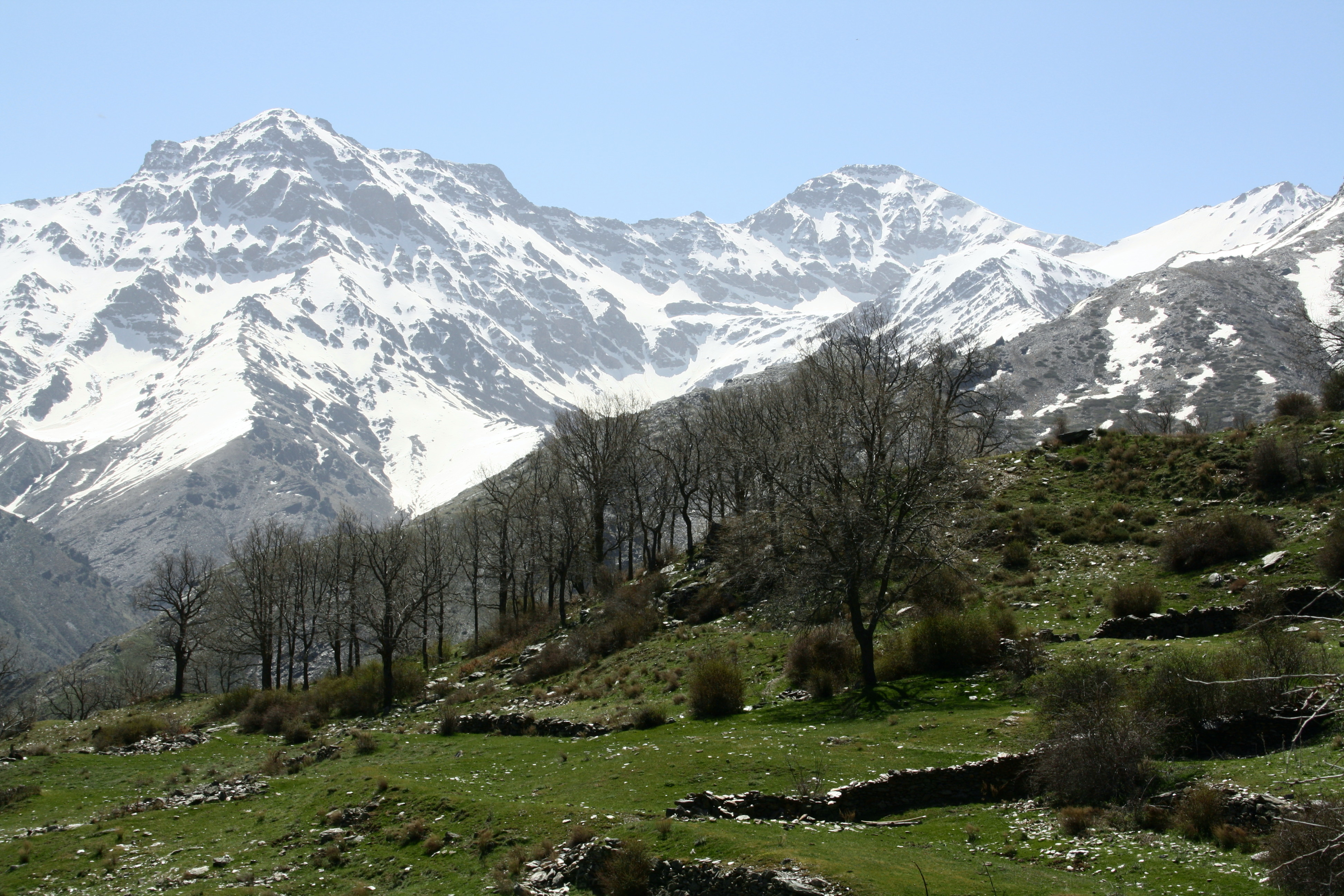
- Sierra Nevada National Park.
- Location of Sierra Nevada
- Location: Granada and Almería, Spain
- Coordinates: 37°12′0″N 3°15′0″W

Sierra Nevada National Park (Spanish: Parque nacional de Sierra Nevada) is a national park located in the Sierra Nevada within the provinces of Granada and Almería, in Spain. It was declared a national park on 14 January 1999. It stretches from the Alpujarra to El Marquesado and the Lecrín Valley, covering a total area of 85,883 hectares, making it the largest national park in Spain until the expansion of the Cabrera Archipelago Maritime-Terrestrial National Park from 10,021 to 90,800 hectares in 2019.

The park incorporates the municipalities of Abla, Abrucena, Alboloduy, Alsodux, Bayárcal, Beires, Canjáyar, Fiñana, Fondón, Laujar de Andarax, Nacimiento, Ohanes, Paterna del Río, Rágol, Las Tres Villas, Aldeire, Alpujarra de La Sierra, Bérchules, Bubión, Busquístar, Cáñar, Capileira, Dílar, Dólar, Dúrcal, Ferreira, Güéjar Sierra, Huéneja, Jerez del Marquesado, Juviles, Lanjarón, Lanteira, Lecrín, Lugros, Monachil, Nevada, Nigüelas, Pampaneira, Pórtugos, Soportújar, La Taha, Trevélez, Valor and La Zubia.

== Geography ==
The Sierra Nevada National Park stretches from the Alpujarra to El Marquesado and the Lecrin Valley, covering a total area of 85,883 hectares, There are more than 20 peaks over 3,000 meters, with the highest being Mulhacén (3479 m), Veleta (3396 m) and Alcazaba (3371 m). The rivers that rise on the north face of the range feed the Guadalquivir basin, the most important ones being the Fardes and Genil. Meanwhile, the rivers that rise on the west and south faces run down into the Mediterranean. These include the Dúrcal, Ízbor, Trevélez and Poqueira, which are all tributaries of the Guadalfeo, which itself rises in the Sierra Nevada, and the Adra and Andarax, with their tributaries. The south and west faces are where you will find the majority of the almost 50 high-mountain lakes that exist in the Sierra Nevada, many of which are also the sources of streams and rivers. Much of the landscape, particularly above 2,400 metres (which was the perpetual snow line prior to the Holocene period) was shaped by the action of glaciers, resulting in characteristic U-shaped valleys.

== Flora and fauna ==
Due to its isolated location in the far south of Europe, the flora and fauna of the Sierra Nevada are unique. During the last ice age, species moved south to escape the colder climate in the north, and as the climate grew warmer again, these species survived by taking refuge in the mountains. As of 2011 2,100 plant species had been catalogued in the park, 116 of which were classified as threatened, and over 60 of which were considered unique to the area (endemic).

Threatened species include Artemisia granatensis, a sub-species of the Marsh Gentian endemic to the Sierra Nevada and the alpine meadow-rue. One of the most emblematic plants of the Sierra Nevada is the Plantago nivalis, also known as the Snow Star.

The park is home to a thriving Spanish ibex population, along with other species such as wild boar, martens, badgers and wildcats. Native bird species include the Golden Eagle, Bonelli's Eagle, Common Kestrel, Little Owl, Eurasian Eagle-owl, European Goldfinch, Serin, Ortolan, Dartford Warbler, Wheateater, Red-legged Partridge and Common Quail.

On the edge of the park lies the Botanic Garden of Cortijuela, where the endemic species of the Sierra are investigated and preserved.

== Biosphere Reserve ==
The Sierra Nevada is also protected as a Biosphere Reserve. As of 2024 the enlargement of the buffer zone of the reserve is under consideration in response to a request from UNESCO.

== Activities ==
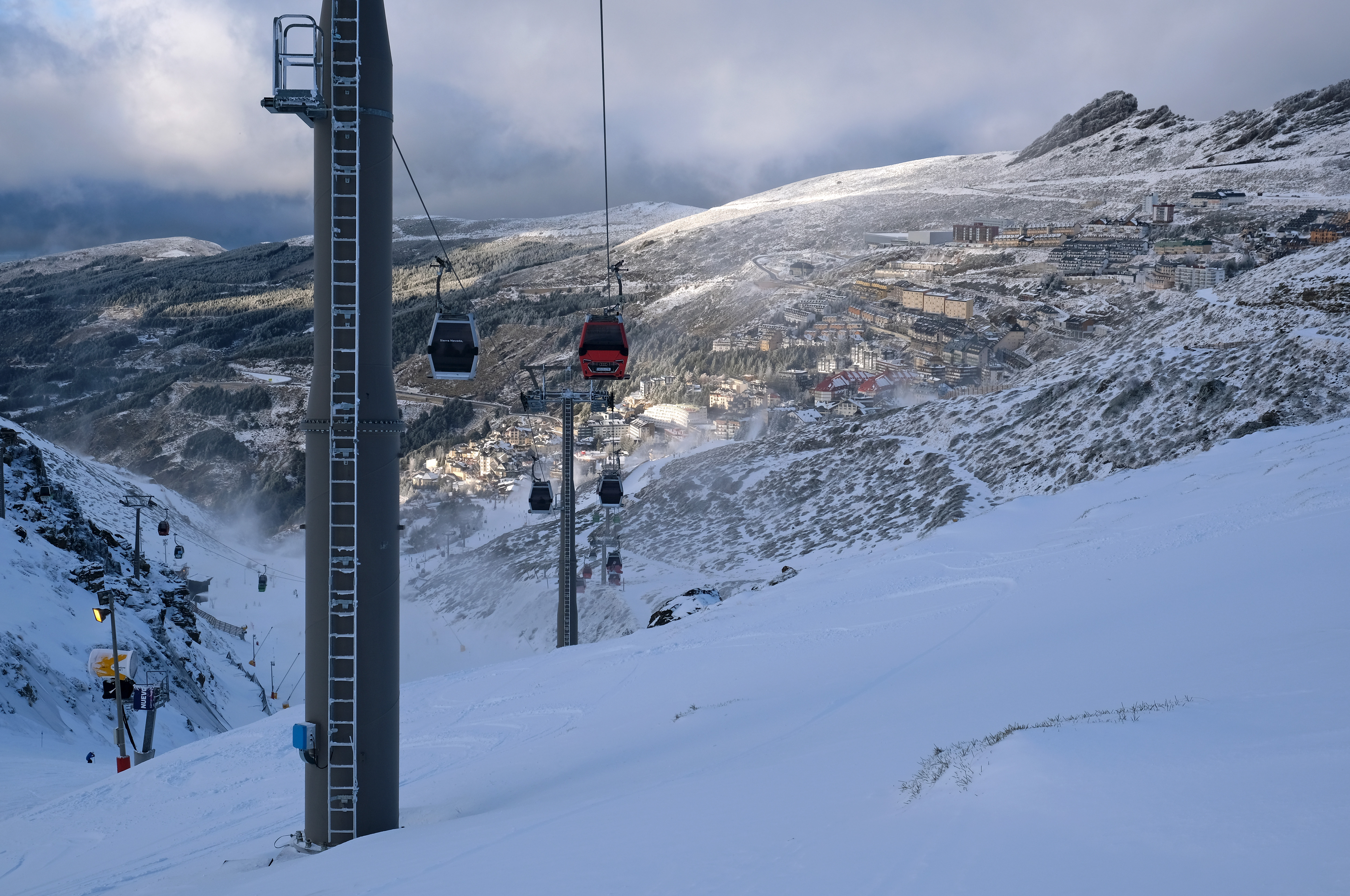
Sierra Nevada Ski Station

The Sierra Nevada Ski Station, which hosted the Alpine World Ski Championships in 1996, is Europe's southernmost ski resort. Thanks to its high altitude, the skiing season can last from late November until the start of May.

Bases for hiking or bird-watching in the Sierra Nevada include Capileira, Trevélez, Monachil, Güéjar Sierra and Bubión. It is relatively easy to reach the summits of Mulhacén and Veleta, whereas Alcazaba is slightly harder to reach. Dotted around the Sierra Nevada there are a number of mountain cabins ("refugios") designed for the use of hikers. The three staffed cabins charge a small amount for overnight stays. There are a further six unstaffed cabins in a reasonable state of repair, which are free of charge.

== See also ==
- Sierra Nevada
