= Sierra Nevada National Park =

Sierra Nevada National Park may refer to:

- Sierra Nevada National Park (Spain) in the autonomous community of Andalusia
- Sierra Nevada National Park (Venezuela) in the states of Mérida and Barinas

== See also ==
- Sierra Nevada de Santa Marta National Park, Colombia
