= Pinot =

Pinot may refer to:

- Pinot (grape), a grape family
- Pinot (surname)
- Pinot (restaurant), a restaurant by chef Joachim Splichal

== See also ==
- Pino (disambiguation)
- Pinot simple flic, a 1984 French film with Gérard Jugnot
