= Pinar =

Pinar may refer to:

- Pınar, Turkish feminine given name
- Píñar, municipality located in the province of Granada, Spain
- Pinar del Río, a city of Cuba
- Pinar del Río Province, a province of Cuba
- Pinar, Albania, village in Tirana County, Albania
- Florencia Pinar, 15th-century Spanish poet

== See also ==
- El Pinar (disambiguation), several localities, mainly in Spain
