= Nathalie Carpanedo =

Spanish para-alpine sit skier

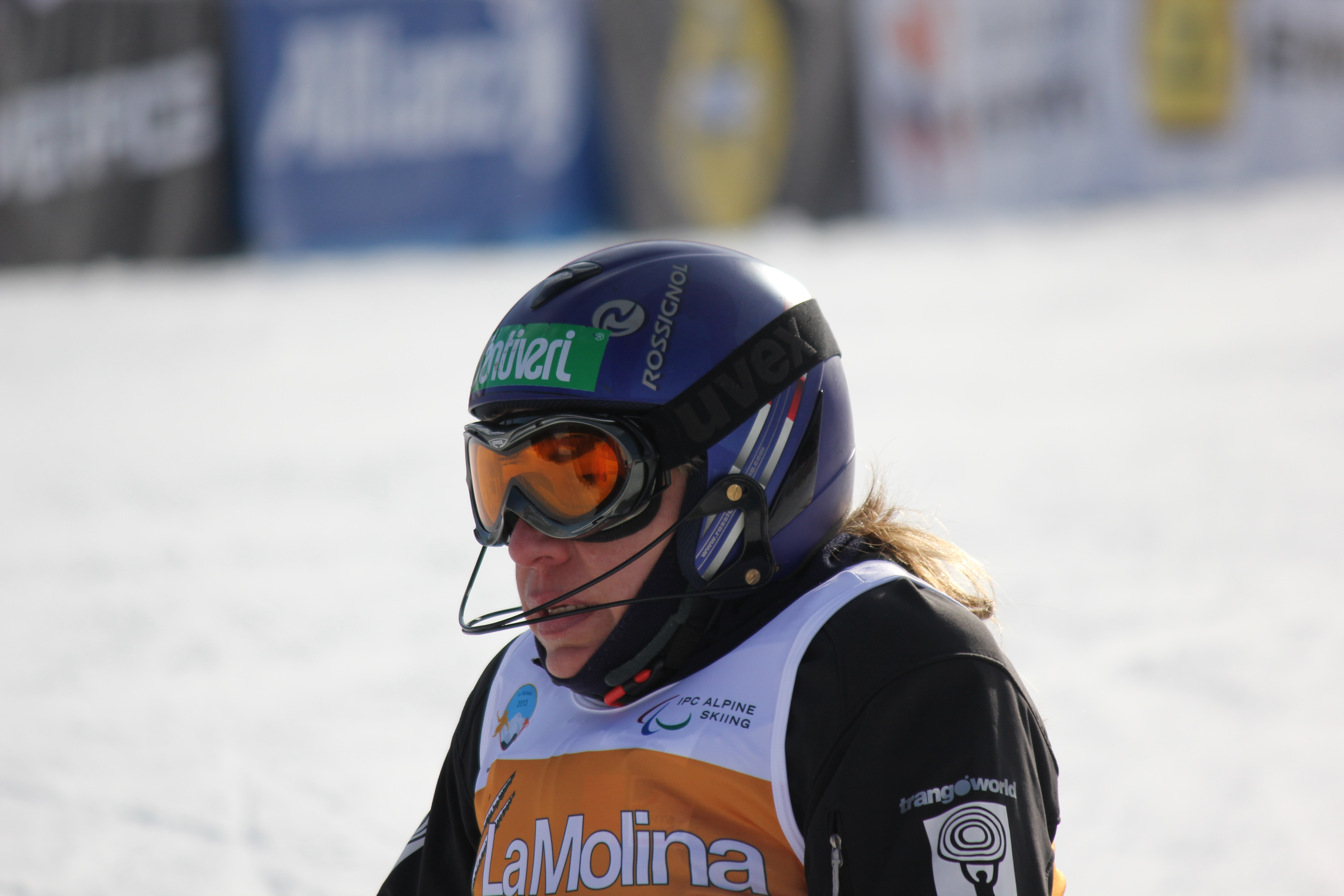

Personal information
- Nationality: Spanish
- Born: November 28, 1998 (age 27) Madrid, Spain

Sport
- Country: Spain
- Sport: Para-alpine skiing
- Event(s): Downhill; Slalom; Giant slalom Super combined Super G
- Club: Fundación También

Nathalie Carpanedo is a Spanish para-alpine sit skier. Having started in able bodied skiing when she was eight years old, she switched to the para-alpine side in 2002 following an accident. She has been involved with several firsts in women's disability skiing in Spain. She has competed in a number of skiing events since 2009 including the 2009 National Championships where she won a pair of gold medals in the slalom and giant slalom events.

== Personal ==
Carpanedo has a physical disability, that is a result of an accident. In 2009, she was awarded the Real Orden del Mérito Deportivo Español. In March 2011, she attended an event at the Palace of Zarzuela in Spain hosted by Prince Felipe and Princess Letizia that sought to promote disability sport and social integration of people with disabilities in the country.

Carpanedo participates in other sports including swimming, kayaking and weight training. She is also a mother.

== Skiing ==
Carpanedo is a sit skier.

Carpanedo is a member of Fundación También, and was one of the team's eight original members. The team was the first women's adaptive ski teams in Spain. As a member of the team, she trains with Teresa Silva, Esther Peris, Mariluz del Río, Sandra Cavallé, Irene Villa and Alberto Ávila. She competed in the Campeonatos de España the first year that women sit-skiers were eligible to do so. She is also a member of Equipo Santiveri. Sponsorship is almost a requirement of her participating in elite disability skiing because of the costs associated with the sport, including the cost of a specialised ski-chair. People and organisations who have sponsored her skiing in some way include Santiveri, Royal Canin, the Vice President of the Government of Galicia, and Xacobeo.

Carpanedo started skiing when she was eight years old. She continued with the sport following her accident. She first participated in the disability side of the sport while in the Alps, and took it up more seriously in 2002 while skiing in the Sierra Nevada.

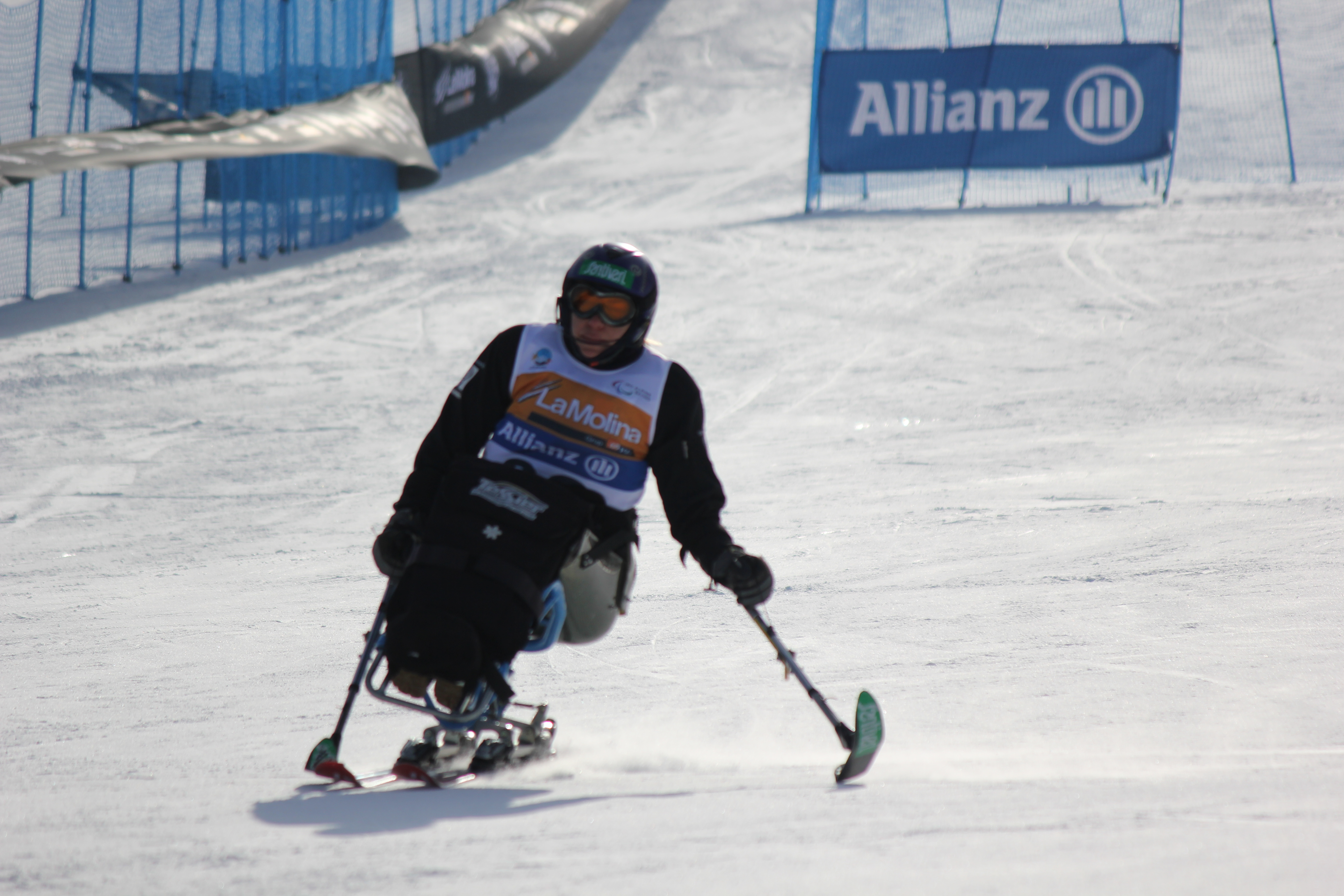
Carpanedo following her DNF slalom run at the 2013 World Championships in La Molina, Spain. Carpanedo was a wild card entry.

For the first time in 2007, the Spanish national championships were open to female sit-skiers. Carpanedo subsequently made her national championship debut that year. Competing at the 2009 Spanish national championships, she won a gold medal. At the 2009 Spanish national championships, Carpanedo won a pair of gold medals in the slalom and giant slalom events. She won the women's 2010 French championships. She competed at the third European Cup event held in La Molina in late January 2010. At Aramón Cerler in April 2010, the last competition of the season that was organised by Campeonato de España de Esquí Alpino adaptado was held. She finished first in the Super G women's sitting event. She participated in Spanish national team competition from 5 to 7 April 2010 in Vancouver. It was organised by the Federación Española de Deportes de Personas con Discapacidad Física (FEDDF), Federación Española de Deportes para Paralíticos Cerebrales (FEDPC) and Federación Española de Deportes para Ciegos (FEDC). She earned a gold medal in the women's sit skiing group. At a November 2010 ski competition in Landgraaf, Netherlands, she finished fourth in the first event that she competed in and fifth in the second event she competed in. In November 2011 at the first IPC sanctioned event of the year which was held in the Netherlands, she finished seventh in the slalom event. She participated in the 2012 Campeonatos de España de Esquí held in Valle de Arán, where the slalom, giant slalom and Super G events were contested. It was her first major competition after having been out of the sport for fifteen months because of injury. She earned a silver medal at the event. In January 2013, she participated in a five-day training camp with the Fundación También team at Sierra Nevada.
