= El Pinar =

El Pinar is a Spanish term referring to a pine tree (Latin: pinus). As a proper name it probably originated in Aragonese. It may refer to:

- A Spanish family name
- Localities in Spain:
  - El Pinar, Canary Islands (El Pinar de El Hierro)
  - El Pinar, Granada, Andalusia
  - El Pinar, Castellón (El Pinar del Grau), part of Castellón de la Plana, Valenciana
    - Platja del Pinar, beach of El Pinar del Grau
  - El Pinar, Almería, Andalusia
  - El Pinar, Ávila, Castile and León
  - El Pinar, Madrid
  - El Pinar, Málaga, Andalusia
  - El Pinar, Reus, part of Reus, Catalonia
  - El Pinar, Rubí, part of Rubí, Barcelona, Catalonia
  - El Pinar, Segovia, Castile and León
  - Urbanització El Pinar, quarter in Castellvell del Camp, Province of Tarragona, Catalonia
- El Pinar, Uruguay, coastal resort in Canelones Department

== See also ==
- Pinar (disambiguation)
- Pino (disambiguation)
