= Cenes de la Vega =

Coordinates: 37°09′N 3°32′W

Cenes de la Vega, Spain
- Flag Coat of arms

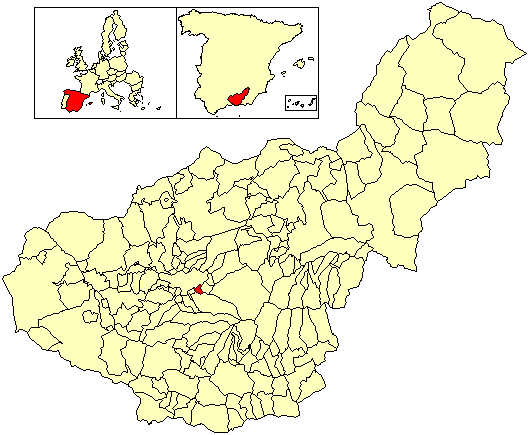
- Location of Cenes de la Vega
- Country: Spain
- Province: Granada
- Municipality: Cenes de la Vega

Area
  - Total: 9.42 km^{2} (3.64 sq mi)
  - Land: 9.40 km^{2} (3.63 sq mi)
  - Water: 0.02 km^{2} (0.0077 sq mi)
- Elevation: 741 m (2,431 ft)

Population (2025-01-01)
  - Total: 8,254
  - Density: 12,168/km^{2} (31,510/sq mi)
- Time zone: UTC+1 (CET)
  - Summer (DST): UTC+2 (CEST)

Cenes de la Vega is a municipality located in the province of Granada, Spain. According to the 2020 census (INE), the city has a population of 8,153 inhabitants.

== Geography ==
=== Orography ===
Cenes de la Vega has an irregular orography, standing on one side of the valley through which the Genil Crosses, at the hillside of the cerro del oro. The lowest point has an elevation of about 700 meters above sea level, and the highest point is around 1200 meters above the sea level, located in the Purche, where Cenes de la vega borders with the municipality of Monachil. Cerro del Oro, reach an elevation of about 1020 meters, and it's called like this because under it there is gold

== Climate ==
The climate in Cenes de la Vega is Mediterranean. The summers are hot and dry and the winters are cold and wet. The coolest month is January with an average temperature of 6 °C and the hottest month is July with 25 °C of average temperature.

== See also ==
- List of municipalities in Granada
