= Béznar Reservoir =

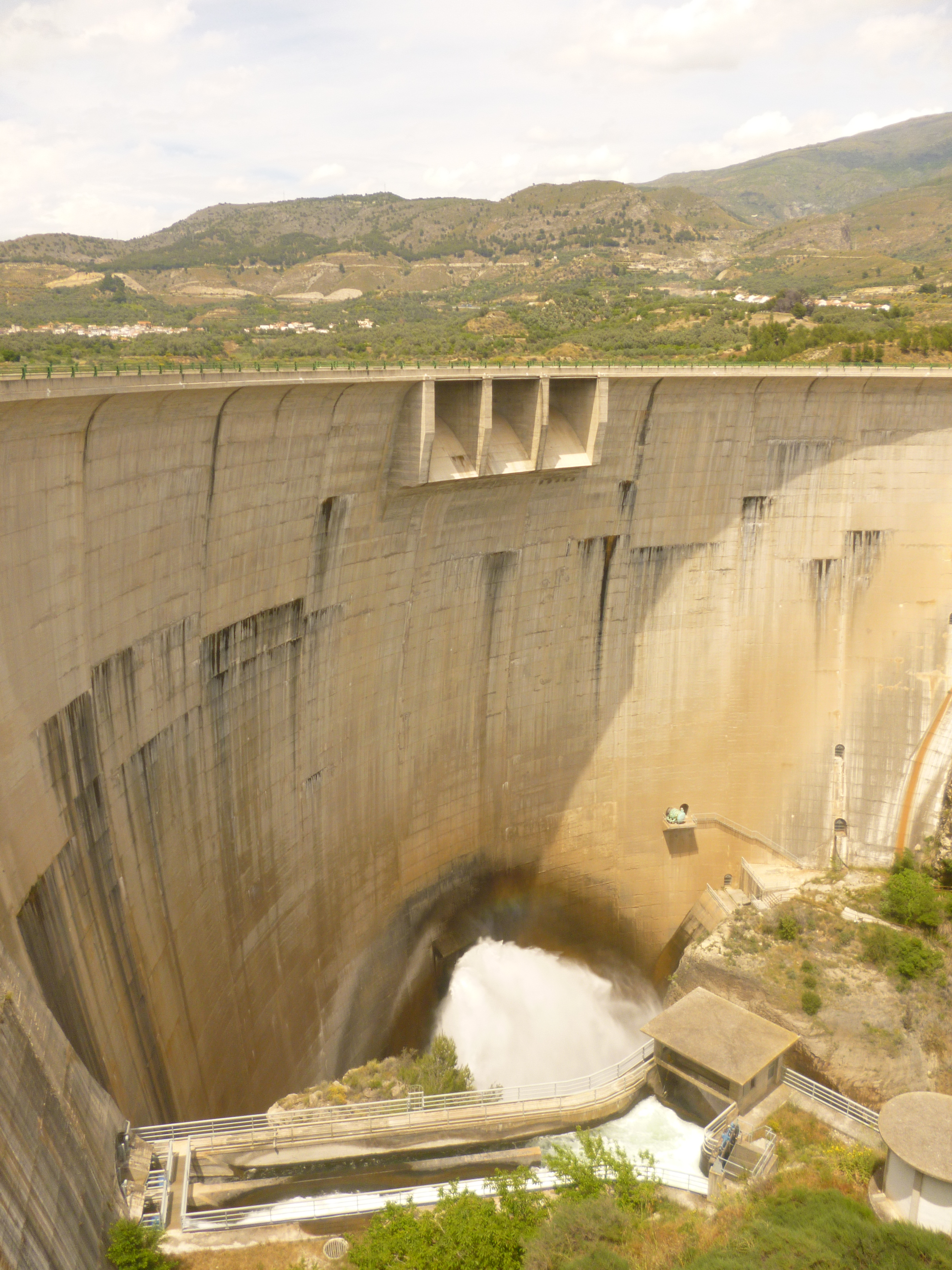

- Location within Andalusia
- Location: Béznar and El Pinar
- Coordinates: 36°55′17″N 3°33′8″W
- Type: reservoir
- Primary inflows: Izbor River
- Basin countries: Spain
- Built: 1986

Béznar Reservoir is a reservoir in the province of Granada, Andalusia, Spain.

== See also ==
- List of reservoirs and dams in Andalusia
