= Irene Villa =

Spanish author and journalist (born 1978)

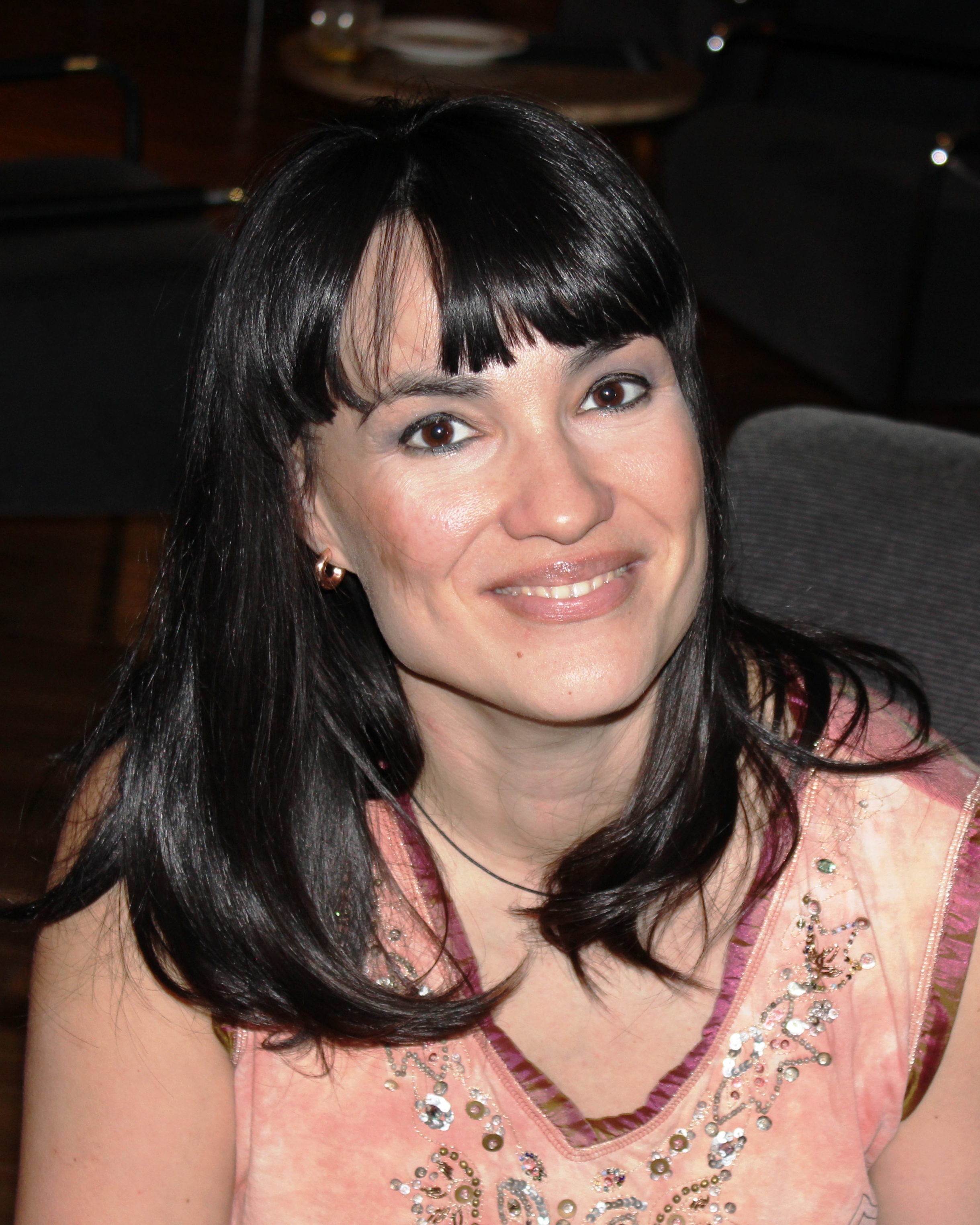
- Villa in February 2013

Personal information
- Nationality: Spanish
- Born: Irene Villa González; 21 November 1978 (age 46); Madrid, Spain
- Website: http://www.irenevilla.org/

Sport
- Country: Spain
- Sport: Para-alpine skiing
- Event(s): Downhill; Slalom; Giant slalom Super combined Super G

Irene Villa (born 21 November 1978) is a Spanish author and journalist who became a political figure after losing both legs in an ETA attack in Madrid at the age of 12. She was particularly vocal in her opposition to José Luis Rodríguez Zapatero's policy of offering peace talks to the group if they disarmed. She has since become a para-alpine skier.

== Personal ==
Interview with Irene Villa

Villa grew up and as of 2012 continues to live in Madrid. On 12 October 1991, Villa lost both of her legs and several fingers as a result of a bombing by Basque terrorist group ETA. Her father told the doctors not to do anything and that it would be better to let her die because her injuries were so extensive and her life would be full of suffering. The doctors did not heed his request. Her mother also lost a leg and an arm in the bombing. Following her experience with the attack, she has been active in opposing any government-led negotiations with ETA and the peace process for openly dealing with the group, as proposed by former Spanish President José Luis Rodríguez Zapatero, describing them as "murderers". She also gave frequent interviews to Spanish magazines, including ¡Hola! and Telva, before becoming a columnist herself with the Spanish newspaper La Razon.

In 2007, Villa became less active in the "fight" against ETA, citing the hostility she felt she was receiving and her desire to devote more time to skiing. One of the people who subjected her and others to hostility, insulting Villa in an online forum, was sentenced to prison for a year and four months, and had to pay a fine of 2,850€ for humiliating victims of terrorism.

Villa has a bachelor's degree in Audiovisual Communication from the European University of Madrid. In addition to this, she has also taken courses in psychology, humanities and communication. She earned a scholarship from the Adecco Foundation in 2009. She is married to Juan Pablo Lauro and gave birth to three sons. She has published an autobiography, Saber que se puede, about her life and experiences. In 2012, she participated in the International Day of Life.

In 2011 she married the Argentine entrepreneur Juan Pablo Lauro from whom she has three children, Carlos Andrés (born 2012), Pablo Gael (born 2015) and Eric Adriano (born 2016).

== Fencing ==
Before taking up skiing, Villa was involved in wheelchair fencing and in 2006, she participated in the Spanish Cup where she finished second. This was her first introduction to elite disability sport in Spain.

== Skiing ==
Villa is a LW12-2 class paralympic skier, and a member of Fundación También. This club was the first women's disability ski team created in the country. She trains with Teresa Silva, Nathalie Carpanedo, Esther Peris, MariLuz del Rio, Sandra Cavallé, and Alberto Ávila. Behind the scenes in the sport, she was one of several people trying to open a para-alpine skiing center in Las Leñas, Argentina. in 2010, she attended the National Sports Congress of People with Physical Disabilities where she was a speaker along with other prominent sportswomen with disabilities including Teresa Perales and Teresa Silva. In February 2011, she participated in a Madrid-based event designed to teach students with disabilities in area schools how to ski. The event was organised by Fundación También. She has won the women's sitting group at the Spanish national championships.

In 2007, Villa was actively training to make the 2010 Winter Paralympics. She competed in the Spanish national championships that year, the first time they were open to female sit skiers. The Campeonato de Cataluña Open de Esquí Alpino took place in late January 2010 with skiers representing five regions of Spain including Aragon, Galicia, Catalonia, Madrid and the Basque Country. She represented Madrid as a member of the ski club Club for All of Madrid, and finished first in the sitting category. She finished fourth in the Women Giant slalom Sitting at the 2011 Europa Cup final in March in La Molina, but took the gold medal in the women's sitting class for a January 2011 ski race sponsored by Fundación También and Santiveri, El Corte Inglés and Cetursa Sierra Nevada. In November 2011 at the first IPC-sanctioned event of the year which was held in the Netherlands, she had a DNF and eighth-place finish. She missed the 2012 Campeonatos de España de Esquí and other events in the 2011/2012 ski season because she was pregnant. In January 2013, she participated in a five-day training camp with the Equipo de Competición Fundación También de Esquí at Sierra Nevada.
