= El Pino =

El Pino may refer to:

== Natural features ==
- El Pino (The Pine Tree), a natural landmark in Los Angeles
- El Pino Lake, a lake in Guatemala

== Populated places ==
- El Pino, Dominican Republic, a community in the Dominican Republic
- El Pino (Aller), a village in Asturias, Spain
- El Pino de Tormes, a village in Salamanca, Spain
- El Pino Parque Historic District, an historic district in Dayton Beach, Florida

== Other uses ==
- El Pino & the Volunteers, a band from the Netherlands

== See also ==
- Hospital El Pino metro station in Santiago, Chile.
