= Teresa Silva =

Spanish elite sportswoman with disabilities

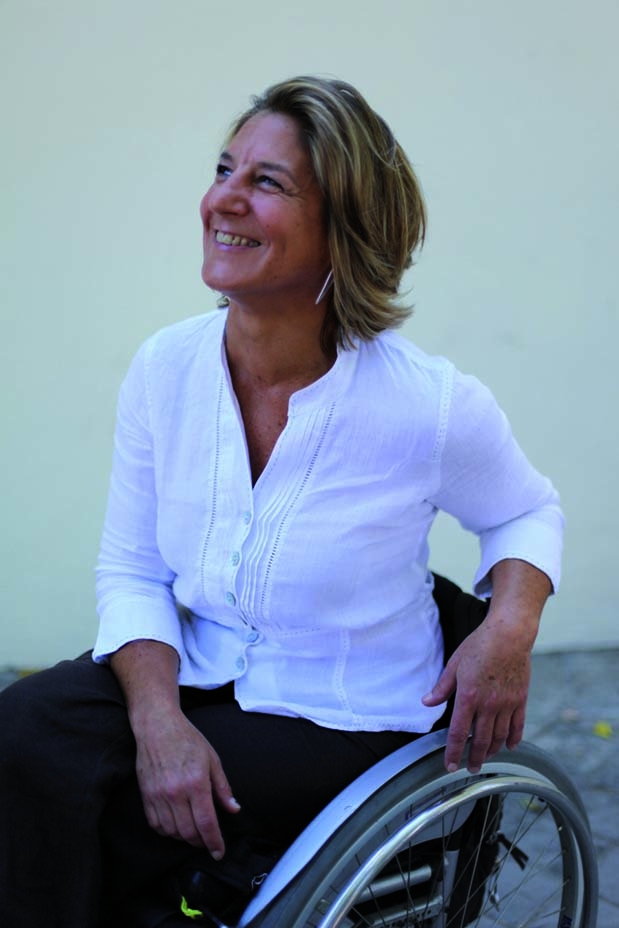

Personal information
- Birth name: Teresa Silva
- Nationality: Spanish
- Born: 28 November 1982; Vigo, Spain
- Website: www.tambien.org

Sport
- Country: Spain
- Sport: Para-alpine skiing
- Event(s): Downhill; Slalom; Giant slalom Super combined Super G

Teresa Silva is a Spanish elite sportswoman with disabilities, founder and president of Fundación También. She has also made a name for herself in disciplines such as skiing and adapted sailing, in which she has been Champion of Spain and Regional Champion, respectively. Creator of the first female adapted alpine sit skiing competition team in Spain in 2007. President of the Spanish 2.4 mR Sailing Association. She is also a recognised speaker in the world of disability and adapted sports.

== Skiing and sailing ==
A great fan of sports in general and airborne sports in particular, Teresa's life took a turn when in 1989 she had a paragliding accident during training for the Austrian World Championship, causing paraplegia that binds her forever to a wheelchair. After nine months of rehabilitation at the National Hospital of Paraplegics in Toledo, she began to face all the difficulties that people with disabilities encounter in their day-to-day lives. These were difficult times, but she did not give up her efforts to return to her life as a journalist and innovative businesswoman in air sports. In April 1998, Teresa was able to start adapted alpine skiing and in January 2000 she created the Santiveri Adaptive Ski Exhibition and Competition Team. Following the success of this experience, a much more ambitious challenge is proposed: to achieve the social inclusion of people with disabilities through sport. An idea that was realized in 2000 when she founded Fundación También. Since then, she has dedicated herself to adapted sport: cycling, skiing, canoeing, sailing, paddle tennis, diving, hiking, ice skating ... activities in which sport and inclusion go hand in hand. Today, more than 8,500 beneficiaries enjoy adapted sports, in contact with nature and together with their family and friends thanks to Fundación También. Alpine skiing has been one of the disciplines in which Teresa Silva has shined, creating in 2007 the first Women's adapted alpine sit skiing Team, whose patron was the olympic athlete Blanca Fernández Ochoa, and with members such as Irene Villa, Nathalie Carpanedo, Mariluz del Río, Vicky González, Sandra Cavallé, Begoña Gerboles and Esther Peris. Thanks to this, the historic milestone of creating a women's category in the Spanish Championships was achieved. Throughout her career participating in national and international competitions she has won numerous medals, proclaimed Absolute Champion of Spain in 2011. Sailing is another of the sports in which she has excelled, becoming regional champion in 2011 and 2012. Throughout her career she has received important awards such as: Siete Estrellas del Deporte Comunidad de Madrid, CERMI of CAM, International Madrid Woman's Week, Award ANOME, Women's Council Award of the Municipality of Madrid Participating in We create Spaces of Equality, TOP 100 Mujeres Líderes en España 2012, El Bronx Discapacidad y Deporte, Te lo Mereces from La Barandilla Association or Sport Resilience from IER.
