= Esther Peris =

Spanish paraplegic (born 2000)

Personal information
- Nationality: Spanish
- Born: November 28, 1980 (age 45) Spain

Sport
- Country: Spain
- Sport: Para-alpine skiing
- Event(s): Downhill; Slalom; Giant slalom Super combined Super G

Esther Peris (born November 28, 1980) is a Spanish paraplegic who has competed in table tennis and para-alpine skiing at the national level.

== Table tennis ==
Peris is an adaptive table tennis player, and a member of Escuela de Tenis de Mesa Adaptado de la Fundación del Lesionado Medular. In 2012, she competed in the Spanish national table tennis championships.

== Skiing ==
Peris started able-bodied skiing a year before she became a paraplegic. She only had limited time to participate and never competed in able-bodied ski competitions. In para-alpine skiing, Peris is a sit-skier. When skiing on her own in Spain, many resorts require that she be accompanied by a monitor to supervise her on the slopes. This and specialized equipment make skiing very expensive.

Peris was one of the original members of the first Spanish women's adaptive skiing team, Fundación También, in Spain, having been with the team since 2007. AS a member of the team, she skis with Teresa Silva, Nathalie Carpanedo, Mariluz del Río, Sandra Cavallé, Irene Villa and Alberto Ávila. One of the goals of the team was to develop skiers to represent Spain at the highest levels. The Fundación También team created a special team for elite skiers, Equipo Santiveri, in 2007 with assistance from a sponsor. That team originally had only six elite members of which she was one. She and her teammates had ambitions of qualifying for the 2010 Winter Paralympics.

In 2007, the national championships were open to female sit-skiers for the first time, and Peris was one of several Spanish skiers to compete. She spent a week training with the Fundación También ahead of the 2009 Spanish national championships. In February 2011, she participated in a Madrid-based event designed to teach students with disabilities in area schools how to ski. The event was organised by Fundación También. In April 2011, she competed at the Andorran hosted Spanish national championships. In January 2013, she participated in a five-day training camp with the Fundación También at Sierra Nevada.

== Personal life ==
Peris is from Madrid, and participates several sports including in skiing, table tennis, swimming and hand cycling.

When Peris was 23 years old, she developed a spinal tumor that eventually resulted in her becoming a paraplegic. She requires a wheelchair for daily use. Following becoming a paraplegic, she became involved in efforts to empower other sportswomen with disabilities.
