= Saleres =

Human settlement in Granada Province, Spain

Coordinates: 36.9297°N 3.5978°W

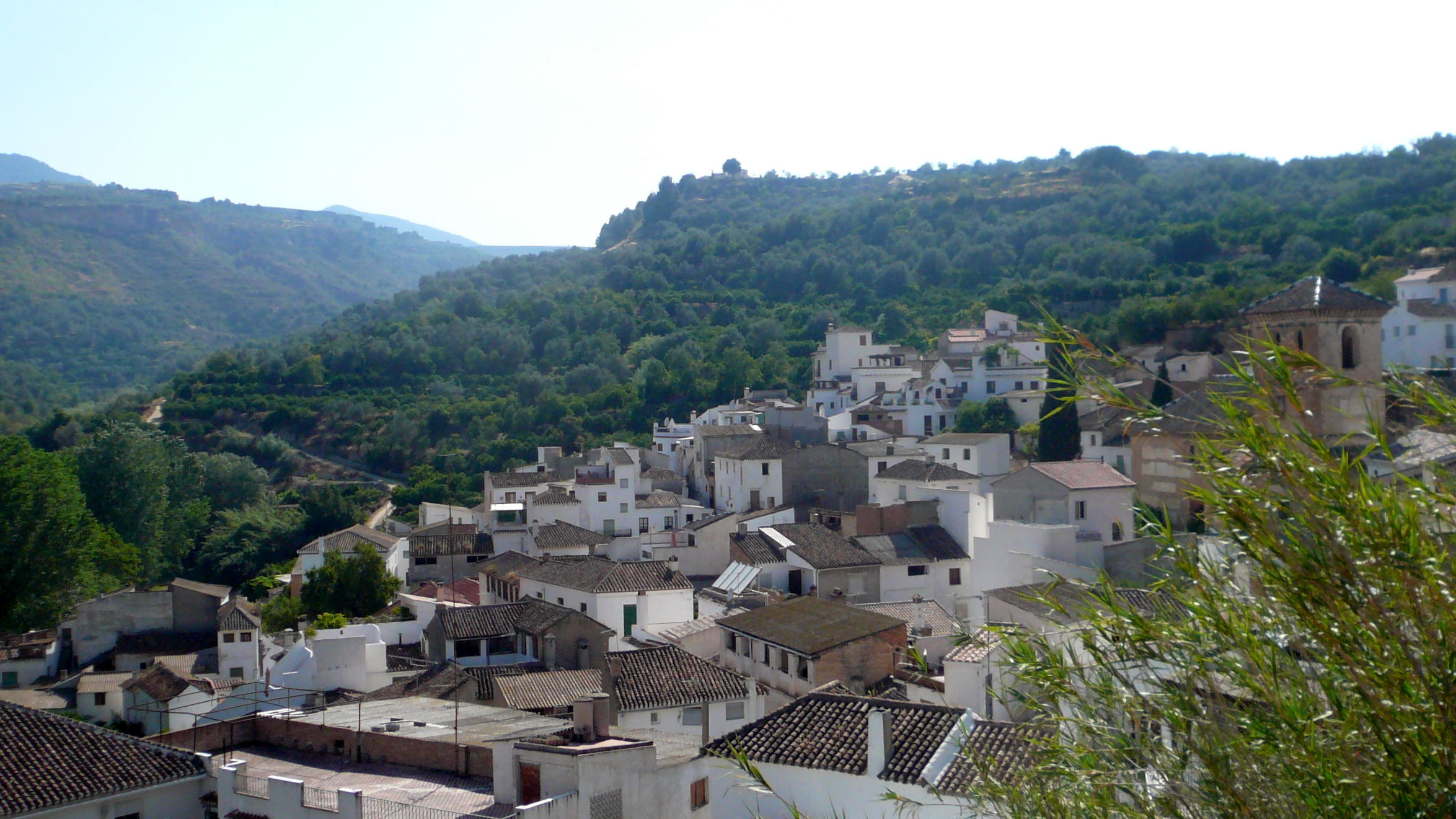
Saleres

Saleres is a Spanish village which belongs to the municipality of El Valle, in the province of Granada (Andalusia). It is located in the southern part of Lecrín Valley. Saleres is near Restábal, Melegís, La Loma, Albuñuelas and Pinos del Valle.

Its structure is entirely Muslim, full of narrow streets and courtyards, so that it prevents the passage of vehicles. Olive, citrus and almond are cultivated by its 165 inhabitants.

== Main sights ==
Among his most spectacular landscapes, we observe: the view of the village or the lush valley made by the river of Saleres. This river is called "The Saint" by its inhabitants due to a popular story which tells that it has plenty of water even during drought. Furthermore, the Sierra, which is accessed to by an ancient lane, and where the Fountain of the Seven Years' is.

== History ==
Saleres has a shared history with the other towns of the Lecrin Valley. The first settlers established seize its ideal environment since prehistoric stages, having secured the water, gathering fruit, hunting and adequate defense.

Muslims, despite infighting and Christian expeditions, perfected agriculture, introduced new crops, orchards and fostered improved irrigation, giving this village water distribution systems, with slight modifications, are preserved today. The population of the Valley should be around in a few moments the 7,000 inhabitants in that time. During the time of the surrender of Boabdil and his flight to Lecrín Valley, in April 1491 Christians sent troops to the Valley, where they took captives and cattle. After the fall of Granada in 1492, Valley residents were still living and working their land as Mudejars. In Christmas 1499, rebels went against the Crown for breaking the agreements established in the capitulations and receiving pressure to convert to Christianity. Then, they were forced to convert and be baptized. After the civil wars of the kingdom of Granada, in 1570 Felipe II ordered the expulsion of the Moors from Lecrín Valley.

Saleres Mosque at the beginning and after the Christian conquest began to be used for church. It was built between the years 1558 and 1562. The church eventually fell down in the year 1683. And quickly build a new church, where they could celebrate religious cults began.

When its Moorish population was deported, forty-three settlers came to the assigned lots that were going to be distributed. In 1780, great river flood took 38 houses away. A century later, the village suffered the effects of the great earthquake of Andalusia, and the cholera epidemic of phylloxera which produced the total ruin of the vineyards. During the first half of the twentieth century it increased its population, culminating in 1960 with 587 inhabitants, who cultivated the paratas neatly and accessible terraces by riding mule or on foot.

Saleres was an independent local government until 1972, when it merged with Restábal and Melegís in one municipality called The Valley.

== Festival ==
The festivities in honor of St. James and Our Lady of the Rosary is in October 28. There is usually a religious procession before the main mass.
