= El Pino Parque Historic District =

Historic district in Florida, United States

- U.S. National Register of Historic Places
- U.S. Historic district
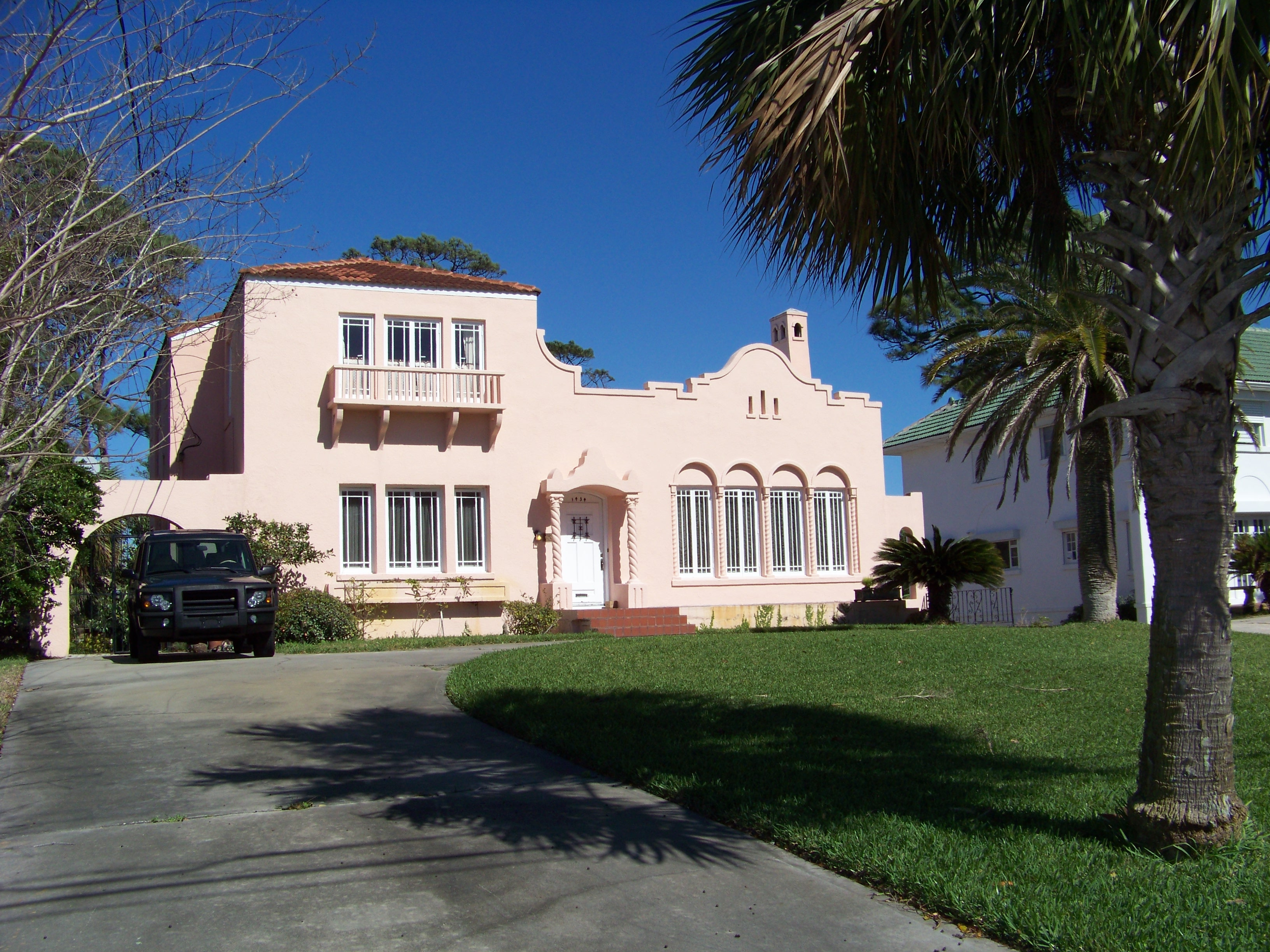
- A house in the El Pino Parque Historic District

- Location within Volusia County
- Location: Daytona Beach, Florida
- Coordinates: 29°15′4″N 81°1′41″W
- Area: 120 acres (0.49 km^{2})
- NRHP reference No.: 93000318
- Added to NRHP: April 26, 1993

The El Pino Parque Historic District is a U.S. historic district (designated as such on April 26, 1993) located in Daytona Beach, Florida. The district is from 1412 through 1604 North Halifax Drive. It contains 11 historic buildings, many surrounded by palm trees.
