= Pinos Genil =

- city
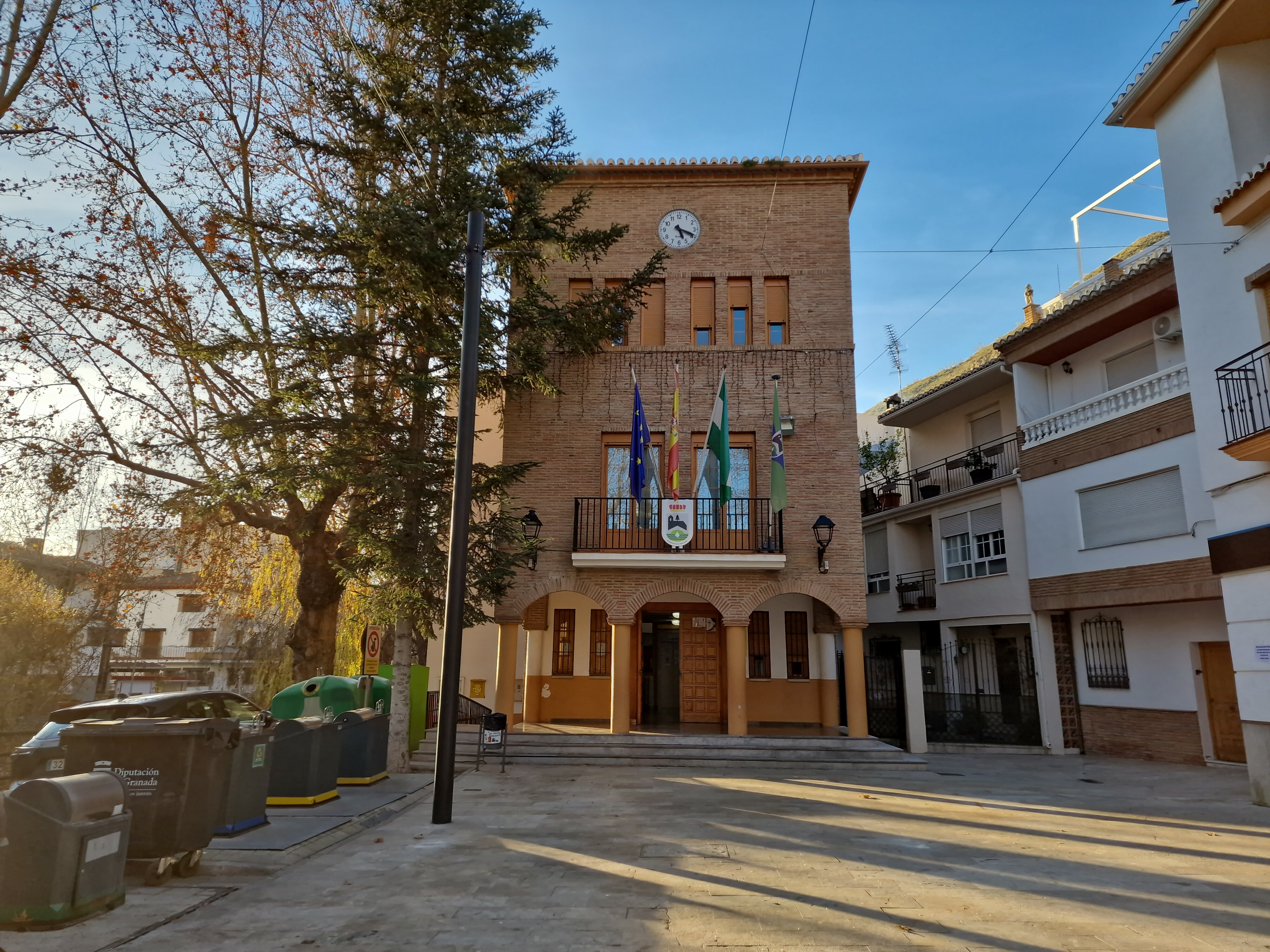

- Flag Coat of arms

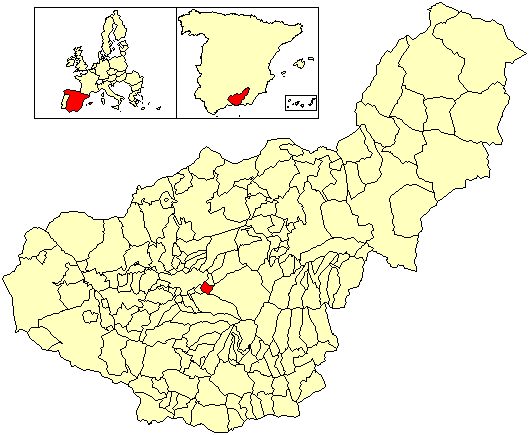
- Location of Pinos Genil
- Coordinates: 37°10′N 3°30′W
- Country: Spain
- Province: Granada
- Municipality: Pinos Genil

Area
  - Total: 14 km^{2} (5.4 sq mi)
- Elevation: 774 m (2,539 ft)

Population (2025-01-01)
  - Total: 1,642
  - Density: 120/km^{2} (300/sq mi)
- Time zone: UTC+1 (CET)
  - Summer (DST): UTC+2 (CEST)

Pinos Genil is a municipality located in the province of Granada, Spain. According to the 2005 census (INE), the city has a population of 1262 inhabitants.

== See also ==
- List of municipalities in Granada
