= Pino (fictional character) =

Pino is a fictional character that is featured in a Swedish book series and film series. Both the books and the films are for children up to the age of four. Pino who is a mouse with big ears features simple events that small children can relate to. Pino often goes out to play, but also does things that grown-ups do, like flying and working as a doctor.

The first book about Pino was published in 2002, and today there are 24 different stories published. The authors are Swedes Eva Pils and Agneta Norelid, while Kenneth Andersson has made the drawings. 20 short films has been made about Pino and has been broadcast on SVT's kids show Bolibompa and has also been distributed through DVD.Pino is also featured in a computer game, memory card game and toys in the form of a teddy bear.

Pino has become successful in France where he is called Tomi and 14 of the books have so far been published there. Pino has also been published in Norway and Japan.

== Books ==
- Pinos dagbok – 2002
- Pinos sommarbok – 2004
- Pinos vinterbok – 2004
- Pinos födelsedag – 2005
- Pinos lekpark – 2005
- Pino är bäst – 2007
- Sov gott Pino – 2007
- Rita och Räkna med Pino
- Räkna med Pino – 2008
- Pinos bondgård – 2010
- Doktor Pino – 2010
- Pinos affär – 2010
- Pinos jul – 2010
- Pino och Hunden – 2010
- Pino ska ut och åka – 2010
- Pino på upptäcktsfärd – 2010
- Pinos pannkakskalas – 2010
- Pino går på tivoli – 2010
- Pino och katten – 2010
- Pino på utflykt – 2010
- Pino på cirkus – 2010
- Pinos dagis – 2010
- Pino på skattjakt – 2013
- Pino och pottan – 2014

== DVD ==
Two DVDs has been released about Pino. The two DVDs consists of 10 animated films each.

- Pino på äventyr (2010)
- Pino och hans vänner (2010)
