= El Valle, Spain =

Coordinates: 36°55′47″N 3°34′57″W

El Valle
- Flag Coat of arms

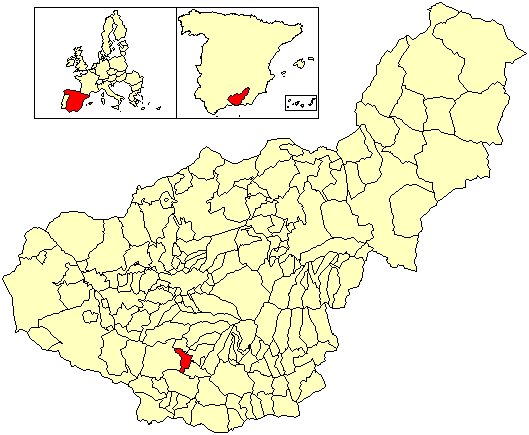

- Location in Spain.
- Country: Spain
- Autonomous community: Andalusia
- Province: Granada

Area
  - Total: 25.91 km^{2} (10.00 sq mi)
- Elevation: 538 m (1,765 ft)

Population (2025-01-01)
  - Total: 941
  - Density: 36.3/km^{2} (94.1/sq mi)
- Time zone: UTC+1 (CET)
  - Summer (DST): UTC+2 (CEST)
- Website: www.elvalle.es

El Valle is a municipality in the province of Granada, Spain. As of 2010, it has a population of 1130 inhabitants.

== See also ==
- List of municipalities in Granada
