= Nigüelas =

Coordinates: 36°58′N 3°32′W

Nigüelas, Spain
- town
- Flag Coat of arms

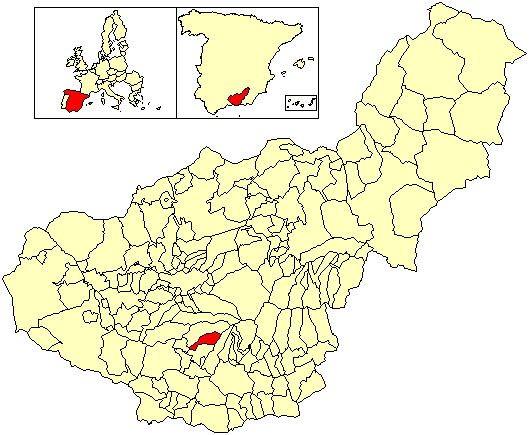
- Location of Nigüelas
- Country: Spain
- Province: Granada
- Municipality: Nigüelas

Area
  - Total: 31 km^{2} (12 sq mi)
- Elevation: 926 m (3,038 ft)

Population (2025-01-01)
  - Total: 1,229
  - Density: 40/km^{2} (100/sq mi)
- Time zone: UTC+1 (CET)
  - Summer (DST): UTC+2 (CEST)

Nigüelas is a municipality located in the province of Granada, Spain. According to the 2012 census (INE), the town has a population of 1203.

== See also ==
- List of municipalities in Granada
