= Pinot (surname) =

Pinot is a surname. Notable people with the surname include:

- Giuseppe Pinot-Gallizio (1902–1964), Italian painter
- Manohara Odelia Pinot (born 1992), Indonesian model
- Margaux Pinot (born 1994), French judoka
- Robert Pinot (1862–1926), long-term secretary-general of the Comité des Forges de France
- Thibaut Pinot (born 1990), French cyclist
