= Cájar =

Cájar, Spain
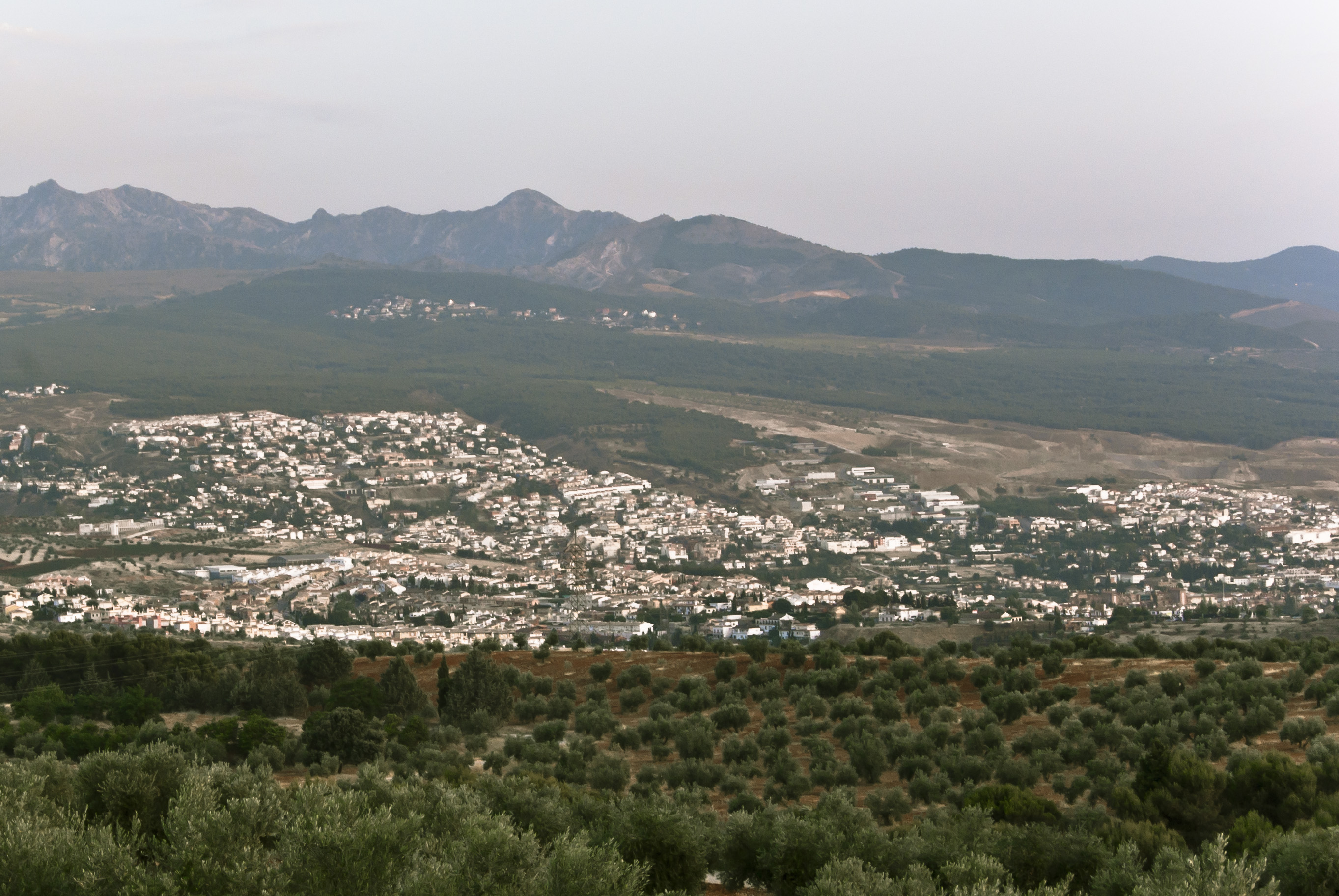
- Cájar on the right

- Flag Coat of arms

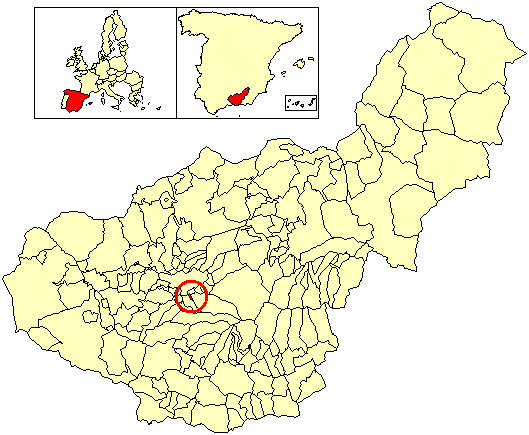
- Location of Cájar
- Coordinates: 37°08′N 3°34′W
- Country: Spain
- Province: Granada
- Municipality: Cájar

Area
  - Total: 2 km^{2} (0.77 sq mi)
- Elevation: 729 m (2,392 ft)

Population (2025-01-01)
  - Total: 5,511
  - Density: 2,800/km^{2} (7,100/sq mi)
- Time zone: UTC+1 (CET)
  - Summer (DST): UTC+2 (CEST)

Cájar is a city located in the province of Granada, Spain. According to the 2005 census (INE), the city has a population of 4,051 inhabitants.

== See also ==
- List of municipalities in Granada
