= Lecrín =

Coordinates: 36°56′56″N 3°33′00″W

Lecrín, Spain
- city
- Flag Coat of arms

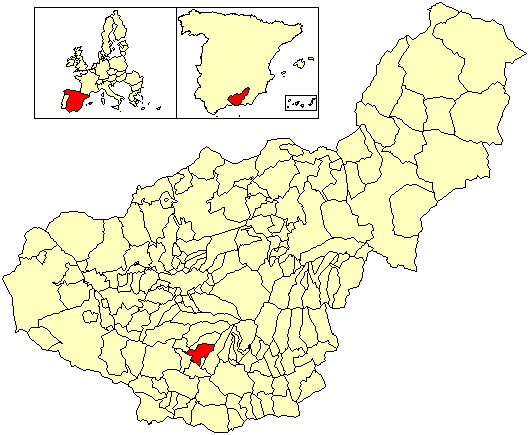
- Location of Lecrín
- Country: Spain
- Province: Granada
- Municipality: Lecrín

Area
  - Total: 40 km^{2} (15 sq mi)

Population (2025-01-01)
  - Total: 2,244
  - Density: 56/km^{2} (150/sq mi)
- Time zone: UTC+1 (CET)
  - Summer (DST): UTC+2 (CEST)

Lecrín is a municipality located in the province of Granada, Spain. According to the 2004 census (INE), the city has a population of 2269 inhabitants. Although the municipality was formed only in 1970, the six areas of which it is comprised have existed for much longer. Lecrín's six constituent areas are Mondújar, Talará, Béznar, Acequias, Chite and Murchas.

== See also ==
- List of municipalities in Granada
