= Sierra Nevada Ski Station =

Ski resort in Granada, Spain

Sierra Nevada
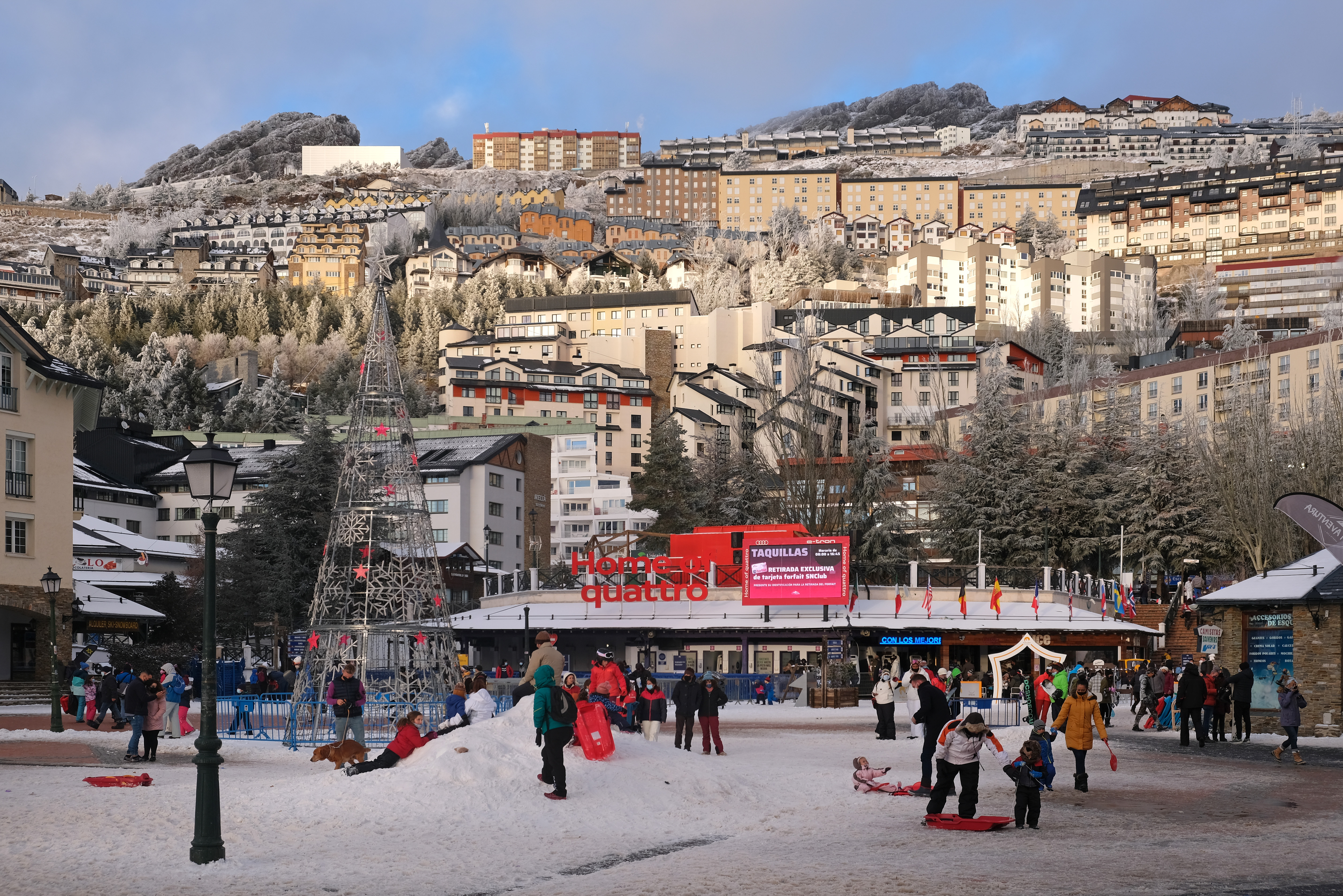
- Pradollano village at Sierra Nevada

- Location in Spain
- Location: Sierra Nevada, Granada, Spain
- Nearest city: Granada – 42 km (26 mi); Málaga – 164 km (102 mi)
- Coordinates: 37.09°N 3.40°W
- Vertical: 1,200 m (3,940 ft)
- Top elevation: 3,300 m (10,830 ft)
- Base elevation: 2,100 m (6,890 ft)
- Trails: 115 - 100 km (60 mi); Green - 16; Blue - 40; Red - 50; Black - 9
- Lift system: 2 Cable cars 17 Chairlifts; 2 T-bar lifts 2 Magic carpets 1 Ski tows
- Snowmaking: 31 km^{2} (12 sq mi); 390 cannons
- Website: sierranevada.es

The Sierra Nevada Ski Station is a ski resort in the Sierra Nevada in the province of Granada in southeastern Spain. The ski area is on the northwestern slopes of Veleta, the third highest peak in Peninsular Spain and the most southerly ski resort in Europe.

The resort hosted the FIS Alpine World Ski Championships in 1996 and occasionally hosts World Cup races, the last being the women's technical races in 2007. In recent years World Slope and Freestyle events took place at the site, which also hosted the 2015 Winter Universiade, the world university games. In March 2017, Sierra Nevada hosted the FIS Freestyle Ski and Snowboarding World Championships.

== Description ==
Sierra Nevada is Europe's southernmost ski resort, and the highest in Spain. Due to its high elevation, the skiing season can last from late November until early May. Particularly towards the end of the season it experiences sunny days of skiing, although wind can be problematic for skiers due to Veleta's prominence and few trees. The resort is situated 27 km (17 mi) from the city of Granada, and is accessed by the A-395. The nearest larger city is Málaga.

At the foot of the slopes there is a resort village, Pradollano, which stretches up a hill to the north of the pistes. The bottom of the village is about 2,100 m (6,890 ft) above sea level, while the summit is just below 3,400 m (11,150 ft). Pradollano is home to a large number of shops, including many that sell or rent ski equipment, souvenir shops and a small supermarket. There is also a variety of ski schools, restaurants, cafés, bars and nightclubs.

The mid-station Borreguiles, which is served by two cable cars that run from the bottom of Pradollano, is at 2,675 m (8,780 ft). There are a few cafés and restaurants, a ski school, a few hire shops and lockers.

The resort is run by a private-public enterprise called Cetursa Sierra Nevada, S.A..

== Activities ==
The main attraction for visitors to the resort is the 105 km (70 mi) of alpine skiing runs. The resort is located wholly above the tree line. The resort does not carry out avalanche blasting, and skiers are generally advised against leaving the pistes due to avalanche risk. The World Cup Giant Slalom run known as “Fuente del Tesoro” is a challenging track As the resort mainly caters to locals, and less to people visiting for a whole week, it is much busier at weekends. There are rarely any queues mid-week outside the main Spanish holidays (first week of December, Christmas through to 6 January and Easter). Even at weekends, queues are generally fairly short by comparison to other European areas especially if the whole resort is open, allowing skiers to spread out across the mountain.

In recent years the resort has made an effort to increase the number of services it offers, including expanding the Mirlo Blanco recreation zone, which now has an ice rink, toboggans, ski-bikes, mini-skis and a track for wheeled toboggans. Some of the heaviest investments have been put into developing what is currently the longest Slope style line in Europe with over 71 modules and a possibility of linking 46 of them in one continuous line. In addition to this, the largest Half Pipe in the country has also been developed.

Summer activities include walking, cycling, horse-riding, and mountain climbing in the area. One of the cable cars and one chairlift are kept open in July and August, making it relatively easy for hikers to reach the summit of Veleta. The African coast can sometimes be glimpsed on clear days.

Also during the summer months, the National Parks office runs a minibus service from Hoya de la Mora, just above the resort village, to Posiciones del Veleta, at 3,100 m (10,170 ft). The service includes a guided commentary about the geology and ecology of the Sierra Nevada.

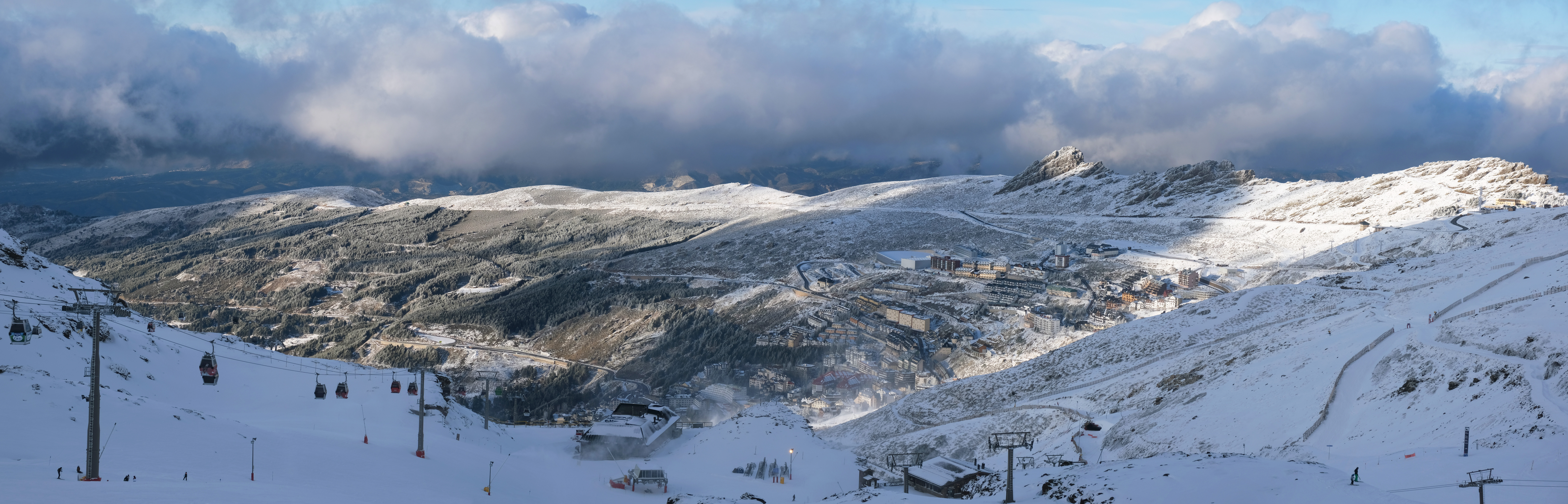
Panoramic view of Sierra Nevada ski resort.

== Transport ==
A bus service connects the resort to the main bus station in the city of Granada, with the journey taking approximately 45 minutes. The bus station is on Avenida de Juan Pablo II. During the skiing season, weekday buses run from the bus station to the resort at 08:00, 10:00 and 17:00, returning at 09:00, 16:00 and 18:30. At weekends and on public holidays they leave Granada at 08:00, 10:00, 15:00 and 17:00, and return at 09:00, 13:00, 16:00 and 18:30. Outside the skiing season, there is a daily bus to the resort at 09:00, while the bus back down leaves at 17:00.

There is also a minibus service that shuttles between the bottom and top of Pradollano, as well as a chair-lift suitable for non-skiers that connects the bottom, middle and top of the village.

== Further information ==
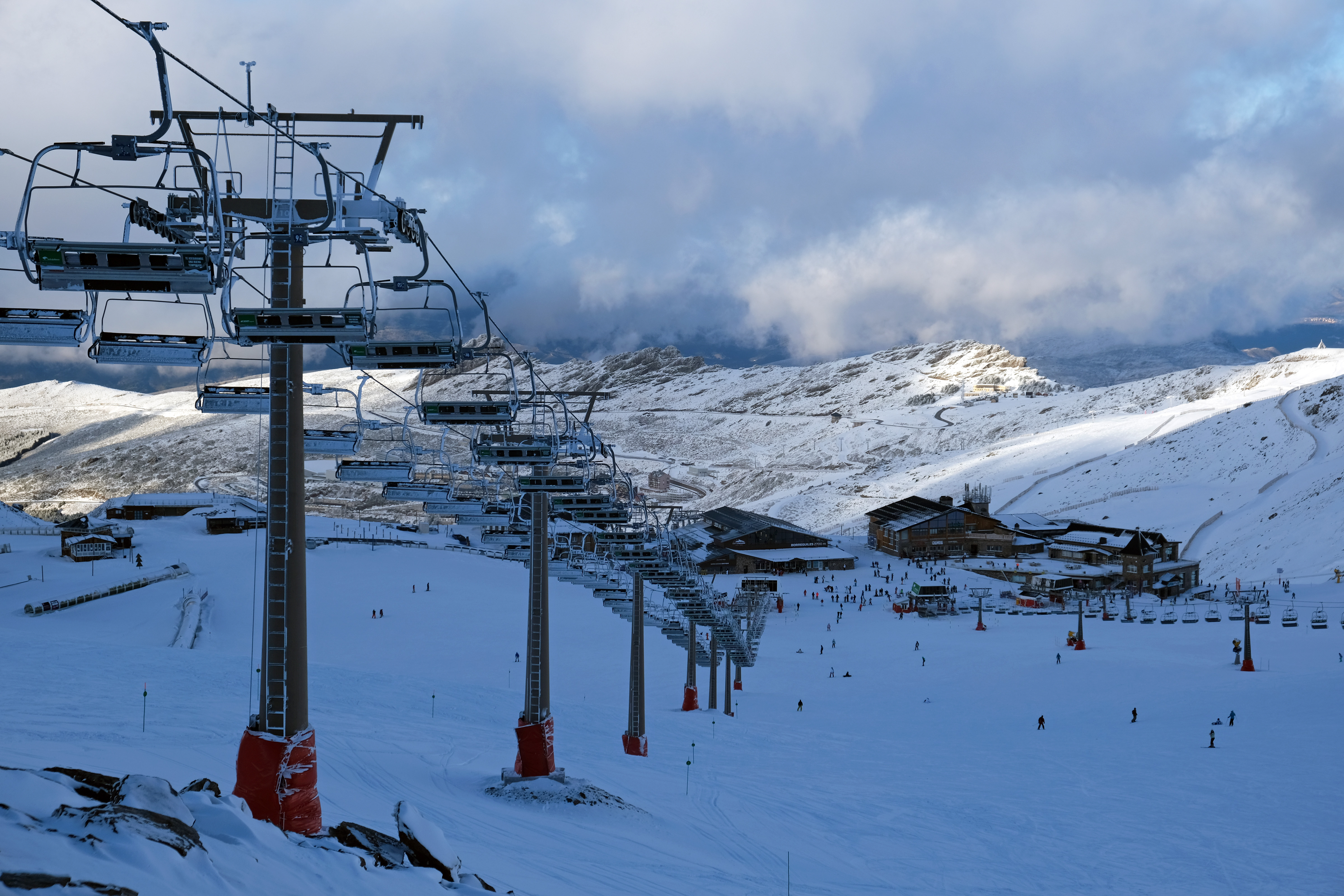
Borreguiles ski station.

The resort is located 32 km (20 mi) from the centre of Granada and is a 50-minute drive.

The ski season normally lasts from the beginning of December until the end of April or beginning of May. The existence of artificial snow machines mean that the resort can open for skiing even when there is no natural snow. Granada has a very high proportion of sunny days even in the winter and usually it is possible to ski with beautiful blue skies and warm temperatures.

The highest summit of the Sierra Nevada range is Mulhacén at 3,481 m (11,421 ft), the highest ski lift and piste goes to just below Veleta, which is at 3,398 m (11,148 ft).

== See also ==
- Sierra Nevada National Park
- Sierra Nevada
