= Güéjar Sierra =

Güéjar Sierra, Spain
- Flag Coat of arms

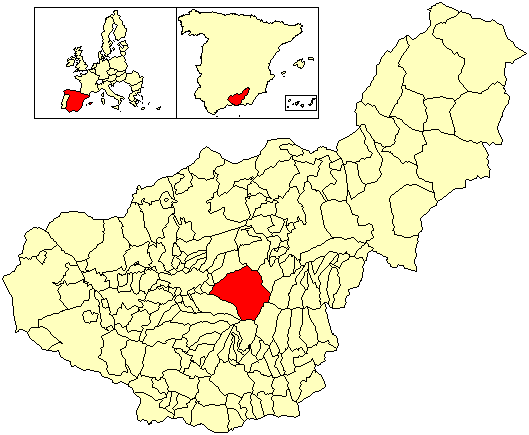
- Location of Güéjar Sierra
- Coordinates: 37°9′N 3°26′W
- Country: Spain
- Province: Granada
- Municipality: Güéjar Sierra

Area
  - Total: 238.95 km^{2} (92.26 sq mi)
- Elevation: 1,000 m (3,300 ft)

Population (2025-01-01)
  - Total: 2,915
  - Density: 12.20/km^{2} (31.60/sq mi)
- Time zone: UTC+1 (CET)
  - Summer (DST): UTC+2 (CEST)

Güéjar Sierra is a village and municipality located in the province of Granada, Spain. According to the INE, it had a population of 2,988 at the start of 2010. The village is situated in the north-western part of the Sierra Nevada mountain range, at an altitude of 1,088 metres. The municipality borders Pinos Genil, Dúdar, Quéntar, La Peza, Lugros, Jérez del Marquesado, Trevélez, Capileira and Monachil. Its boundary with Trevélez and Capileira runs along the highest ridge of the Sierra Nevada, and over Mulhacén, making these the three highest municipalities in peninsular Spain. The Genil and Maitena rivers rise in Güéjar.

== History ==
The castle of El Castillejo, the ruins of which can still be seen just above the village, was built by the Romans, but it was the Moors who settled the village after their conquest of Spain in 711, giving it the name of Qaryat Walyar. It remained in Moorish hands until 25 November 1491, when it was taken by Christian forces during the final phase of the Reconquista. In December 1499 the people of Güéjar took part in a rebellion which had in part been provoked by forced conversions, but they were defeated in January 1500. As a result, 2,500 villagers who had previously been baptized as Christians were taken to Granada and sold as slaves. 1568 saw the start of the Morisco Revolt, led by Aben Humeya, which lasted until 1571, although in Güéjar it was put down in 1569.

== Tourism ==
Güéjar Sierra has a long history as a popular tourist destination. In the early 1920s the Duke of San Pedro Galatino, owner of the Alhambra Palace Hotel in Granada, built a luxury mountain lodge in the countryside above Güéjar. The hotel was inaugurated on 20 March 1925. The Duke intended to construct tramline from Granada to just above Güéjar, from where it would only be a short carriage ride to the hotel. He financed a third of the cost himself, finishing the first section in 1925, and extensions were added in 1928 and 1944. The project was never a financial success, and in 1973 it was closed down. The hotel was also loss-making, and was donated by the Duke to the Diocese of Granada in 1936. Shortly afterwards the Spanish Civil War broke out, and as the front line ran very close to the hotel, it was used as barracks, and was badly damaged as a result. In 1950 it became a seminary.

Güéjar Sierra is a main gateway to the northern faces of Mulhacén, Alcazaba and Veleta, and is also the starting point for the Vereda de la Estrella, one of the most famous hikes in the Sierra Nevada. As a result, tourism remains one of the mainstays of the local economy.

== See also ==
- List of municipalities in Granada
