= Albuñuelas =

Albuñuelas, Spain
- village
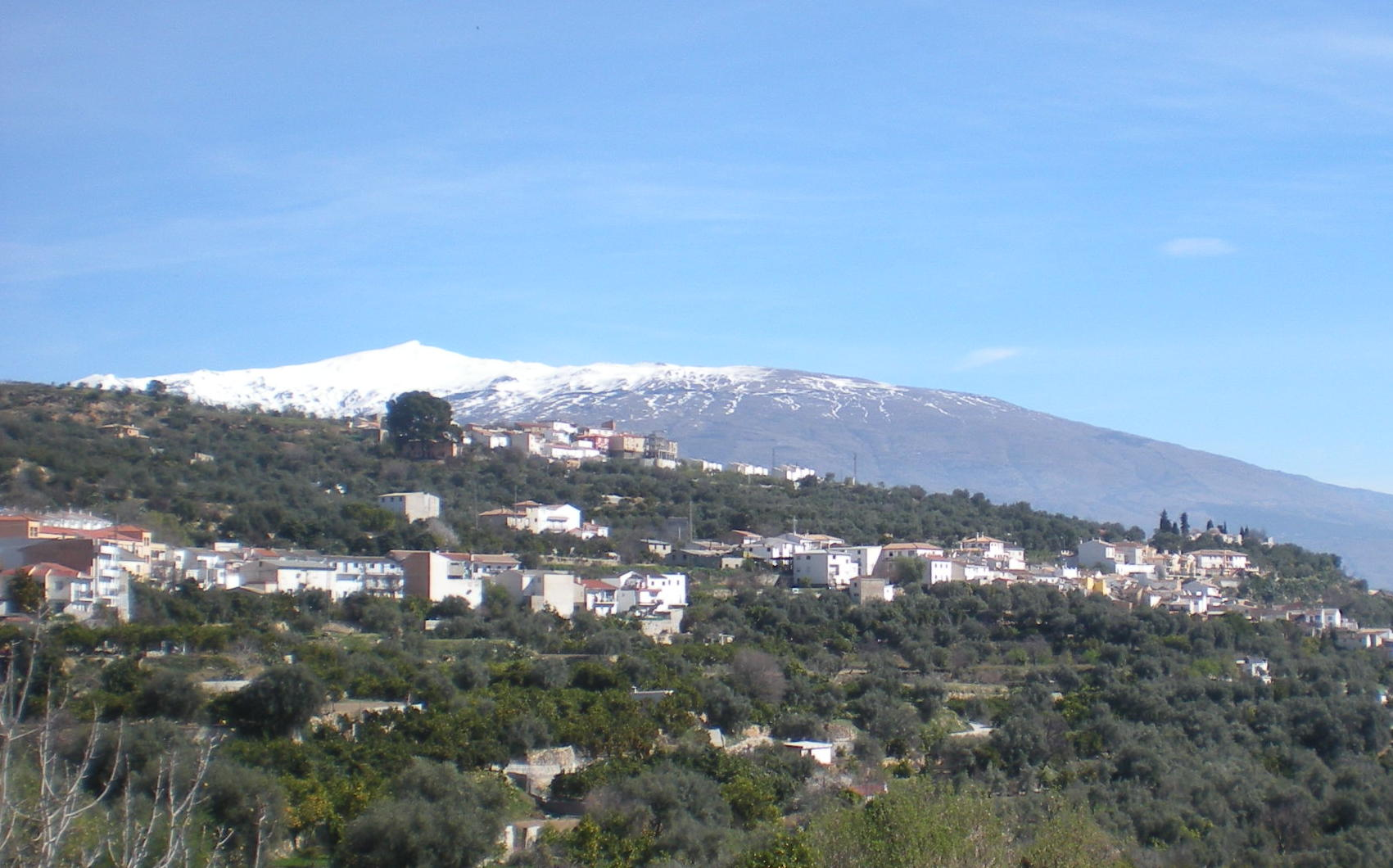

- Flag Coat of arms

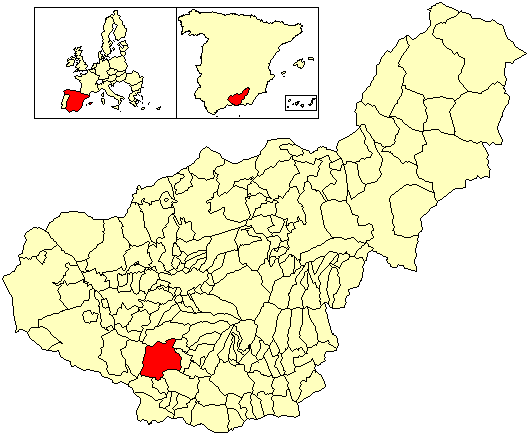
- Location of Albuñuelas
- Coordinates: 36°55′N 3°37′W
- Country: Spain
- Province: Granada
- Municipality: Albuñuelas

Government
  - Alcalde: Juan Jiménez Pérez

Area
  - Total: 140 km^{2} (54 sq mi)
- Elevation: 730 m (2,400 ft)

Population (2025-01-01)
  - Total: 794
  - Density: 5.7/km^{2} (15/sq mi)
- Time zone: UTC+1 (CET)
  - Summer (DST): UTC+2 (CEST)
- Website: www.albunuelas.es

Albuñuelas is a village at the head of the Lecrin Valley, Granada, Spain. It is made up of three neighbourhoods (barrios): Alto, Bajo and Fernán Núñez (locally called La Loma). It is situated on the European route Nº 4 (Spain to Crete).

== History ==
There is evidence of habitation in the area from the late Palaeolithic era. It is impossible to say exactly when the village originated. However, as the Greeks introduced better cultivation of both vine and olive to Spain, together with methods of irrigation and Abuñuelas derived from the Latin ' vinolea ' meaning an area of vines, it suggests their cultivation before the time of the Romans 220 BCE until 409 CE. Here they found small, scattered pueblos built of adobe and whitewashed. They gave the province the name Betis where they had vines and grains cultivated, which together with minerals, were exported back to Rome. There are still openings of mineworkings around the village.

Evidence of Moorish occupation can be seen in the Torre del Tio Bayo, an eight-metre-high (26 ft) tower constructed in the latter Nazarí period, about the middle of the fourteenth century. In the 12th and 13th centuries advances in hydraulic technology were applied to agriculture and the Roman latifundia were superseded by the Arab minifundia system.

It is an area of frequent seismic activity. During the Andalusian earthquake of 25 December 1884 the village suffered considerable damage, in part due to landslides caused by the topography and soil composition. More than 70% of the houses collapsed, and the rest suffered serious or minor damage. There was most damage in the upper neighborhood. There were 102 dead and up to 500 injured.

== Economy ==
Timber, almonds and olives form the main economic activity, on the Sierras de Albuñuelas, which rise to 1426m at Herrero. Albuñuelenses may occasionally be seen farming the surrounding terraces using mules but more often with modern machinery. Recent climate change has replaced the main crop of cereals with citrus and semi tropical fruit.

== Natural history ==
Two main water courses are located in this municipality, Albuñuelas stream and Barranco de Luna. Both originate in the Sierra de Albuñuelas and excavate the eastern border of the Albuñuelas plateau.

== See also ==
- List of municipalities in Granada
