= Villamena =

Villamena, Spain
- city
- Flag Coat of arms

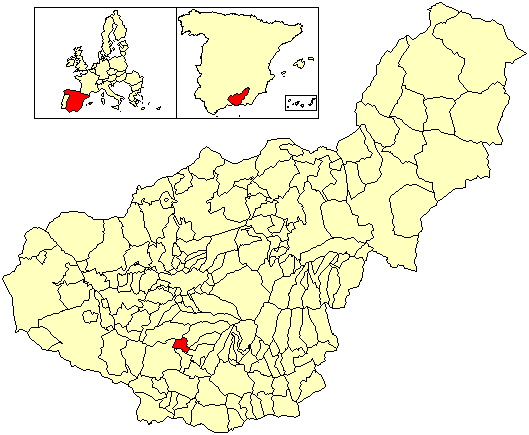
- Location of Villamena
- Coordinates: 36°59′N 3°35′W
- Country: Spain
- Province: Granada
- Municipality: Villamena

Area
  - Total: 20 km^{2} (7.7 sq mi)
- Elevation: 745 m (2,444 ft)

Population (2025-01-01)
  - Total: 1,029
  - Density: 51/km^{2} (130/sq mi)
- Time zone: UTC+1 (CET)
  - Summer (DST): UTC+2 (CEST)

Villamena is a municipality located in the province of Granada, Spain. According to the 2005 census (INE), the city has a population of 1010 inhabitants.

== See also ==
- List of municipalities in Granada
