= Dílar =

- city
- Flag Coat of arms

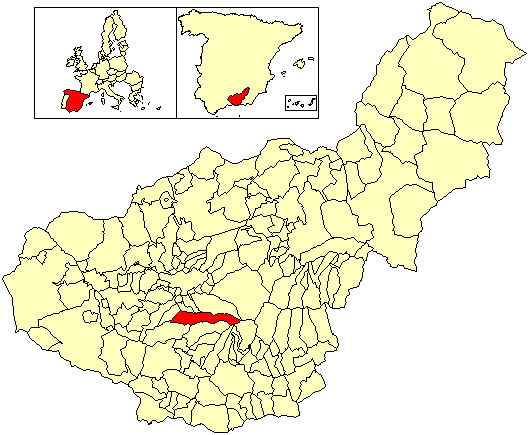
- Location of Dílar
- Coordinates: 37°4′N 03°36′W
- Country: Spain
- Province: Granada
- Municipality: Dílar

Area
  - Total: 80 km^{2} (31 sq mi)
- Elevation: 873 m (2,864 ft)

Population (2025-01-01)
  - Total: 2,384
  - Density: 30/km^{2} (77/sq mi)
- Time zone: UTC+1 (CET)
  - Summer (DST): UTC+2 (CEST)

Dílar is a municipality located in the province of Granada, Spain. According to the 2005 census (INE), the city has a population of 1,620 inhabitants.

== See also ==
- List of municipalities in Granada
