= El Pinar, Granada =

Coordinates: 36°54′37″N 3°33′18″W

El Pinar
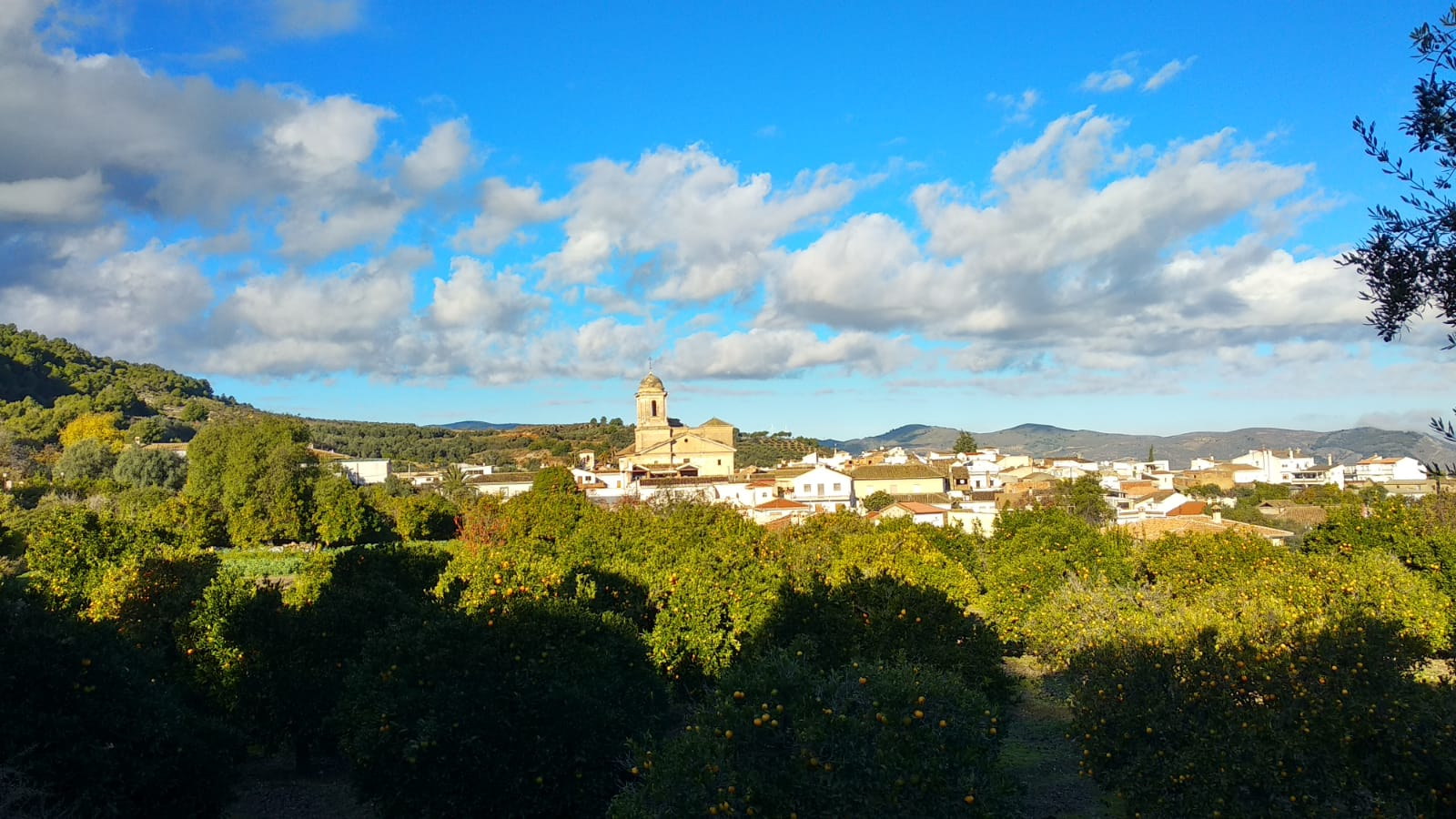
- View of El Pinar

- Flag Coat of arms

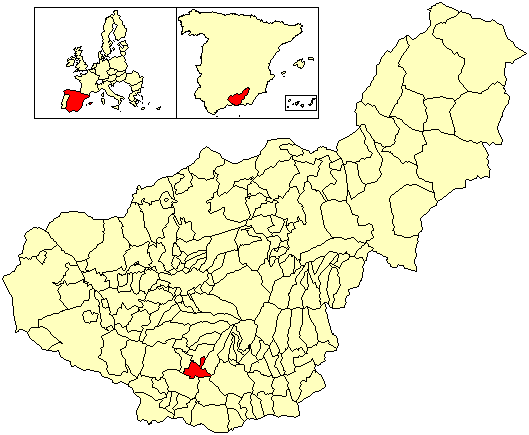

- Location in Spain.
- Country: Spain
- Autonomous community: Andalusia
- Province: Granada

Area
  - Total: 38.01 km^{2} (14.68 sq mi)
- Elevation: 359 m (1,178 ft)

Population (2025-01-01)
  - Total: 867
  - Density: 22.8/km^{2} (59.1/sq mi)
- Time zone: UTC+1 (CET)
  - Summer (DST): UTC+2 (CEST)
- Website: elpinar.sedelectronica.es

El Pinar is a municipality in the province of Granada, Spain. As of 2010, it has a population of 1011 inhabitants.

== See also ==
- List of municipalities in Granada
