= Granada Metro =

Light rail system in Granada, Spain

Metro de Granada

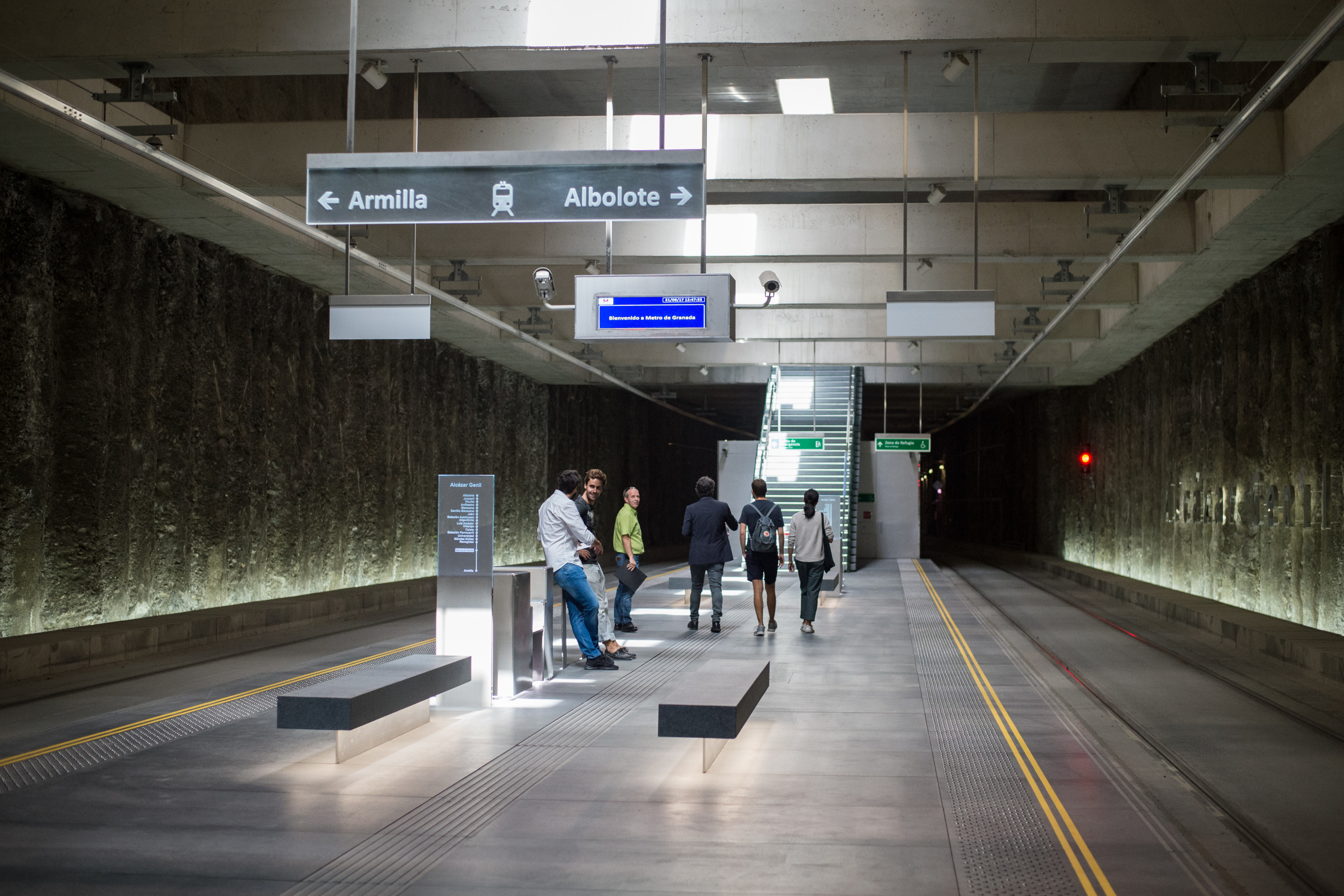
- Granada Metro Alcázar Genil station.

Overview
- Native name: Metro de Granada – Metropolitano de Granada
- Owner: Autonomous Government of Andalusia
- Locale: Granada, Andalusia, Spain
- Transit type: Light rail/Tramway
- Number of lines: 1
- Number of stations: 26
- Daily ridership: 35,634 (weekdays)
- Annual ridership: 17.3 million (2025)
- Website: Metro de Granada

Operation
- Began operation: 21 September 2017
- Operator: Metro De Granada – Junta de Andalucía
- Number of vehicles: 15 CAF Urbos light rail vehicles

Technical
- System length: 15.920 km (9.9 mi)
- Track gauge: 1,435 mm (4 ft 8 1/2 in) standard gauge
System map

The Granada Metro (Metro de Granada in Spanish) is a single light rail line in the city of Granada, Andalusia, Spain and its metropolitan area. It crosses Granada and covers the towns of Albolote, Maracena and Armilla, with underground sections in central Granada and overground sections elsewhere. The line opened on 21 September 2017, and serves 26 stations, of which 3 stations in central Granada are underground. In 2025, the system had a total ridership of 17,329,112 passengers.

== History ==
Construction of the line began in 2007. The first line was initially planned to open in early 2012, and by May 2011 the line was 73% completed. However, funding ran out as a result of the Spanish economic crisis, with only 250 million of the estimated 502 million euros total cost available. In 2012, the remaining funds were secured through a 260 million loan from the European Investment Bank. and the planned date of completion was moved to early 2014. However, further delays resulted in a shortfall in funding, which was only resolved on 1 July 2014. The system finally opened at noon on 21 September 2017.

== Expansion plans ==
Owing to the higher than expected ridership and success of the system, extensions are proposed on the existing line; westward from Armilla splitting into two branches to Cúllar Vega and another to Alhendín, and northwest from Albolote to Pinos Puente and/or Atarfe and Santa Fe. New lines from Granada city centre to Peligros, Ogíjares and Federico García Lorca Granada Airport are also proposed.

The southern extension to Las Gabias via Churriana de la Vega, which will eventually form the southern terminus of Line 2, is due to finish construction in April 2026. There is no confirmed opening date yet but it is expected to be late 2026 subject to line testing.

Planned extensions revealed in 2021. Current line 1 Line 2 Line 3
