= Line 1 (Granada Metro) =

Rapid transit line of the Granada Metro

Coordinates: 37°9′52.09″N 3°36′8.65″W

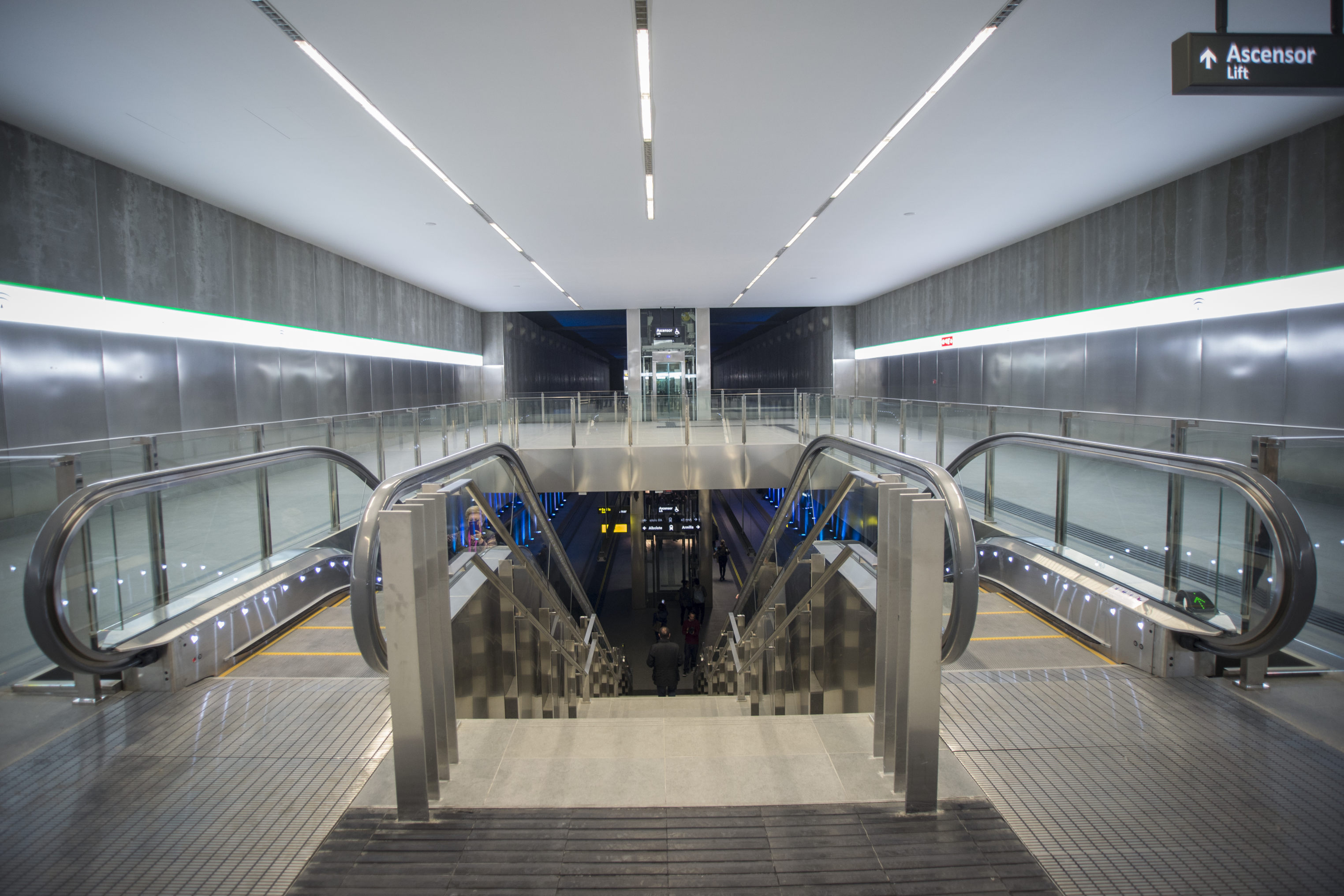
- Recogidas station

Overview
- Native name: Línea 1
- Owner: Regional Government of Andalusia
- Line number: 1
- Locale: Granada
- Termini: Albolete; Armilla
- Stations: 26
- Website: metropolitanogranada.es

Service
- Type: Rapid transit
- System: Granada Metro
- Rolling stock: CAF Urbos 3
- Ridership: 11.7 million yearly trips

History
- Opened: 21 September 2017

Technical
- Line length: 15.920 km (9.892 mi)
- Character: Light Rail
- Track gauge: 1,445 mm (4 ft 8 7/8 in)

Line 1 of the Granada Metro is a light rail line running from Albolote in the north to Armilla in the south, via Maracena and the center of Granada city. Today it has 26 stations and spans 15,920 km (9,890 mi) from end to end.

In 2019, it served a total of 11.7 million passengers, a 15% increase over the previous year.

== Route ==
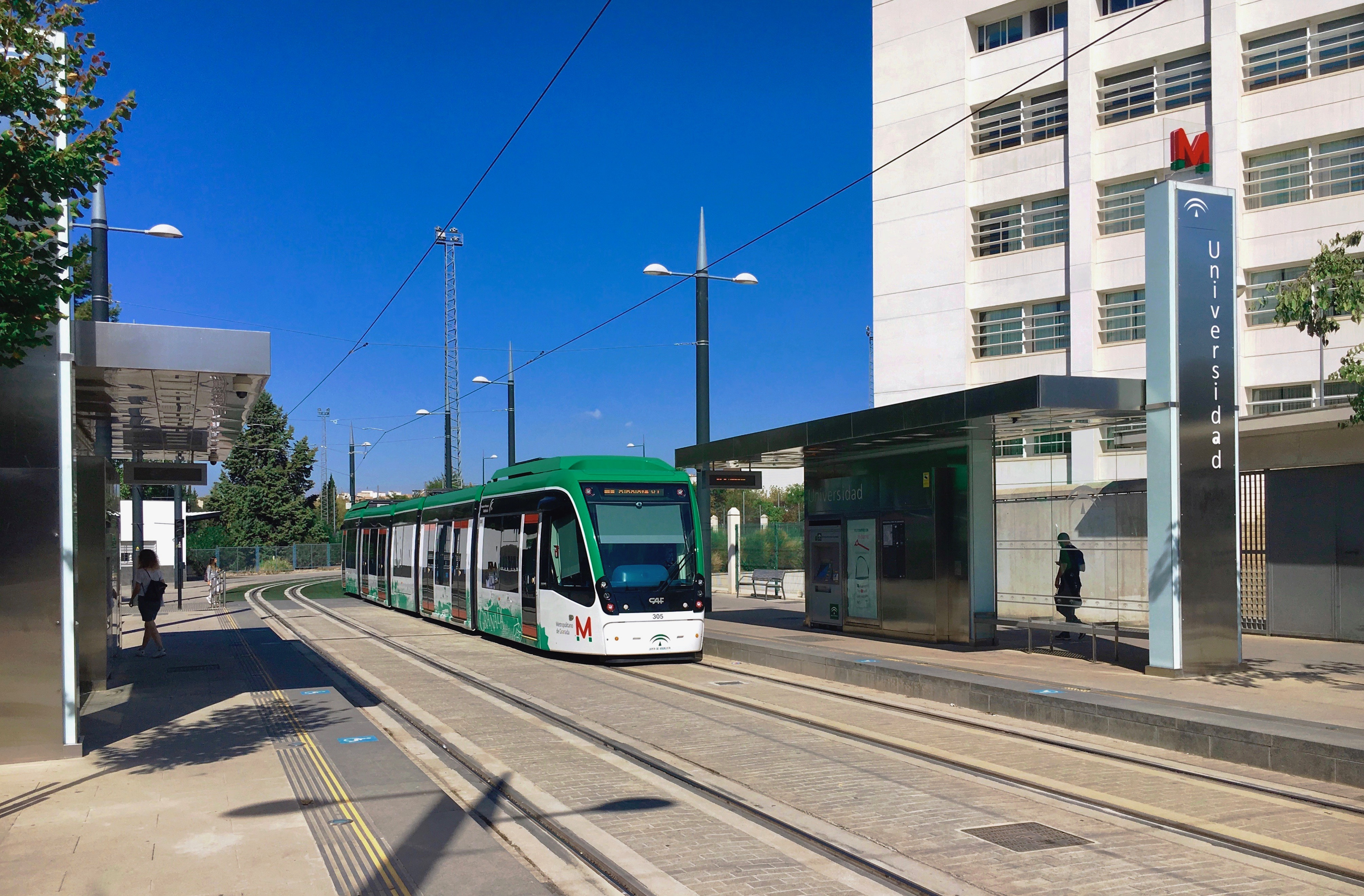
Metro line train in the station of "Universidad", next to the University of Granada.

Line 1 is currently the only line in service in the Granada Metro network. Is entirely in double-track except for a small 730-meter stretch in the municipality of Armilla, where due to the urban layout it was arranged in a single track.

The track gauge is 1,435 mm (international gauge). It is 15 923 meters long and has 26 stations.

The mixed-layout line consists of both underground and surface sections. In the latter, the infrastructure is integrated with the urban landscape of the city. The tracks are arranged on a segregated platform, decorated with cobblestones or grass.

== Rolling stock ==
Line 1 of the Granada Metro is composed by 15 trains Urbos 3 model, made by CAF. These have five modules with a total length of 32 meters and capacity for 200 passengers each.

== Stations ==
Metro Granada line 1 schema.

The line serves the following stations:

Location	Station	Opened	Connections and services
Albolote, Granada	Albolote	2017	Metropolitan buses of Granada: 122
Albolote, Granada	Juncaril	2017	Parking
Maracena, Granada	Vicuña	2017	
Maracena, Granada	Anfiteatro	2017	
Maracena, Granada	Maracena	2017	Metropolitan buses of Granada: 120, 121, 122
Granada	Cerrillo Maracena	2017	
Granada	Jaén	2017	
Granada	Estación Autobuses	2017	Granada Bus Station
Granada	Argentinita	2017	
Granada	Luis Amador	2017	
Granada	Villarejo	2017	
Granada	Caleta	2017	
Granada	Estación Ferrocarril	2017	Granada railway station; Renfe Media Distancia; Avant; Renfe Larga Distancia; Renfe AVE
Granada	Universidad	2017	
Granada	Méndez Núñez	2017	
Granada	Recogidas	2017	
Granada	Alcázar Genil	2017	
Granada	Hípica	2017	
Granada	Andrés Segovia	2017	
Granada	Palacio Deportes	2017	
Granada	Nuevo Los Cármenes	2017	
Granada	Dílar	2017	
Granada	Parque Tecnológico	2017	
Armilla, Granada	Sierra Nevada	2017	
Armilla, Granada	Fernando de los Ríos	2017	
Armilla, Granada	Armilla	2017	Metropolitan buses of Granada: 155

== Future ==
There are currently two extensions scheduled for Line 1 of the Granada Metro through its northern and southern terminus. In 2019, the Government of Andalusia approved a preliminary draft of two extensions. Also, they approved the study for the creation of a second line that would run through the central part of the capital.

=== Southern expansion ===
Expansion of line 1 from Armilla to Las Gabias through Churriana de la Vega.

On November 12, 2021, the Andalusian government approved the southern extension of Granada Metro line 1 from Armilla to Churriana de la Vega and Las Gabias. The new 6.8-kilometer route will involve an investment of 68 million euros, which will be partially financed by Next Generation EU funds from the European Union, after the project has been selected as eligible for them.

It will be the first expansion of the original line. The works will start at spring 2023 and its completion is scheduled for 2026.

=== Northern expansion ===
On June 20, 2021, the Government of Andalusia approved the expansion of the northern terminus from Albolote to Atarfe. This extension is in draft phase, and neither its final route nor the number of stations have yet been defined.

The government confirmed it will arrive at least to the municipality of Atarfe, but is not yet defined if it will be extended beyond it.

== See also ==
- Granada Metro
- Granada
