= Las Gabias =

- city
- Coat of arms

- Location within Province of Granada Location within Andalusia Location within Spain
- Coordinates: 37°08′06″N 03°41′54″W
- Country: Spain
- Autonomous community: Andalusia
- Province: Granada
- Comarca: Vega de Granada

Area
  - Total: 39 km^{2} (15 sq mi)
- Elevation: 677 m (2,221 ft)

Population (2025-01-01)
  - Total: 23,584
  - Density: 600/km^{2} (1,600/sq mi)
- Time zone: UTC+1 (CET)
  - Summer (DST): UTC+2 (CEST)

Las Gabias (commonly referred to as Gabia) is a Spanish city and municipality located in the central southern part of the Vega of Granada, in the province of Granada, in the autonomous community of Andalusia, approximately 8 km from the provincial capital of Granada. It borders the municipalities of Vegas del Genil, Cúllar Vega, Churriana de la Vega, Alhendín, La Malahá, Chimeneas and Santa Fe. Las Gabias includes the localities of "Gabia Grande", the municipal capital, and "Gabia Chica" that were a unified with the region in 1973, in addition to the annexation of Híjar, Los Llanos, Pedro Verde and San Javier. The name may have originated from Hisn Caviar, which means "military tower", in allusion to the one that still exists in Gabia Grande. It is one of the most populous municipalities in Spain as well as one of the youngest, with the median age of inhabitants being only 34.3 years of age. In 2016, the population of Las Gabias surpassed 20,000, making it the third most populous municipality in the Granada Metropolitan Area, surpassed only by Granada and Armilla.

== History ==
To find the first signs of human presence in Las Gabias, we have to go back several thousand years, as confirmed by the ancient "Villa romana de Las Gabias". With Roman domination, the population moves to a nearby area, where there is an important Roman settlement, from which have been discovered the ruins of an oil mill or mill and some dwellings, but the only visible of the area is the Roman Baptistery . Recently Roman remains have been discovered in the annex of Híjar. In time of Muslim domination Gaviar was denominated Alcobra to the municipality. According to the historian Almagro Cárdenas, the word Gabia comes from Gaviar, which means abundant site in holes, because apparently there existed in this place an Iberian colony destined to exploit the plaster quarries existing in the near "Montevive".

The Muslim occupation, which is shaped in the Tower, an Arab fort raised in the center of the population. Historically, El Torreón played an important role in the defense of the city of Granada: In 1490, was taken by the Christians. That same year, the king Fernando had to demolish it, which did not get to be realized. The modern history of Las Gabias begins with the Christian reconquest and the repopulation carried out by Felipe II, arriving people from different points of the peninsula.

In the seventeenth century, historians, when mentioning both places, refer to Gavia the Great and Gavia the Girl, replacing in the nineteenth century the "v" by the "b", passing to the definitive name of Gabia Grande, with its annex of Híjar and Gabia Chica, as two independent municipalities, without in any case appearing the name of Las Gabias. Until the 19th century the town belonged to the County of Gavia and in the 19th century was one of the most prosperous and important villages of the province, with the industry of booming textiles and the growing of flax, hemp and beet, until tobacco cultivation was imposed at the beginning of the 20th century. The definitive formation of the municipality of Las Gabias takes place in the year 1.973, with the merger between the old municipalities of Gabia Grande and Gabia Chica.

== History ==
The history of the town dates back centuries. In 1922, a subterranean building was identified as being either a paleo-Christian baptistery or a Christian-Byzantine one, which could be dated to the second half of the fourth century or the first years of the fifth century. There are also remains of a Roman mill and an Islamic tower, which was a strong point of the defense of the city of Granada before the Christian advance from Alhama de Granada. In the town center of Gabia Grande there is a parish dating back to the beginning of the 20th century. This parish is neo-gothic in design. The old parish had to be demolished due to an earthquake. Also in the center of the same town there is a hermitage, dating from the sixteenth century, where the patron saint of the town, "la Virgen de las Nieves". In the middle of the 19th century the bell tower was made. Gabia Chica has a sixteenth-century Byzantine style church that gives worship to the patron saint of the same town, "la Virgen del Rosario".

== Economy ==
Its economy has been based in the last decades in the agriculture and the production of bricks but at the moment with the crisis of the construction this last sector has lost weight and the majority of the factories of bricks are being closed. Nowadays it has become a large dormitory city and services within the metropolitan area of Granada. It has the first complete golf course of the province and the field of Tiro Juan Carlos I. Formerly a municipality in which dominated the agriculture, thanks to its vega, although already very few people work in this sector. Distribution of uses of agricultural land in 2012.

Distribution of agricultural land in 2012
Herbaceous crops	Surface	589 ha
Herbaceous crops	Main herbaceous irrigation crop	Maize
Herbaceous crops	Corn acreage	85 ha
Herbaceous crops	Main arable crop of rainfed	Barley
Herbaceous crops	Cultivated area of Barley	260 ha
Woody crops	Surface	1251 ha
Woody crops	Main herbaceous irrigation	Olivar
Woody crops	310 ha	
Woody crops	Main arable crop of rainfed	Olivar
Woody crops	Cultivated area of Olivar	645 ha

== Geography ==
The municipality has an area of 39 square kilometres (15 sq mi), divided into two major zones: its vega and its dry land. The municipality is located at an average altitude of 677 meters (2,221 ft) above sea level, and its maximum altitude is 812 m (2,664 ft), located at the hill of the Malpasillo. The municipality is very close to the famous hill Montevive, closely linked to Las Gabias although it is not typical of the municipality. In its municipal term runs the Dílar River, besides streams and ravines like the one of "Salao", Las Andas or Los Barrancones. Las Gabias boasts of being very close to the Sierra Nevada, which makes remarkable its landscape variety. In the municipality, there are several towns: Gabia Grande, Gabia Chica and Híjar, as well as other small towns like Los Llanos, Pedro Verde and San Javier. The dryland of the municipality has almonds, olive trees and wheat, and in its rich vega, its maize crop is greater, although previously were other crops such as beets or tobacco.

== Weather ==
Las Gabias has a continental Mediterranean climate with cold winters and very hot summers. It has extreme temperatures, from a very cold winter (up to −5 °C or 23 °F) to very hot summers (up to 40 °C or 104 °F). The thermal oscillation from day to night is very high too, especially in Autumn and Spring. Precipitations are relatively low, about 400 millimetres (16 in) per year, with dry season from June to September, and rainy especially in Autumn and Spring.

== Demographics ==
The municipality has had constant population growth for several decades, although the growth of the latter decade has been remarkable. It passed from having 8,577 inhabitants in 2000 to 16,369 inhabitants in 2010. In 2016, the population of the municipality exceeded 20,000, making it the fourth most populous municipality in the Granada Metropolitan Area, surpassed only by Granada, Armilla and Maracena. Las Gabias is considered a commuter town next to other nearby towns. Due to the infamous "real estate boom" suffered in Spain in this century, in 2011 the municipality had 2632 vacant houses. From the analysis of the population pyramid shows that more than 25% of the inhabitants of the municipality were under 20 years and only 8% greater than 65. Also, the small difference of 0.50 in the sex ratio in favor of males was produced in the intervals of age between 0 and 50 years, nevertheless, the population of the women was superior to the one of men from the 52 years. Graph of demographic evolution of Las Gabias between 1877 and 2016

Data of the National Institute of Statistics

== Transport and communications ==
The road A-338 A-338 connects Las Gabias with Churriana de la Vega, Armilla, Granada and Alhama de Granada. The following table shows the distances between Las Gabias and other localities, including all the provincial capitals of Andalusia.

=== Location ===
Distance (km) Location Distance (km) Huelva 347 Granada 8 Cádiz 336 Baza 115 Málaga 128 Guadix 71 Córdoba 167 Huéscar 163 Jaén 99 Loja 57 Sevilla 258 Motril 66 Almería 174 Madrid 439

It is expected that in 2018 the works of the new Circunvalación de Granada will finish, that passes through the municipality and will improve the accesses to the same one. In the summer of 2014 the works of the Las Gabias-Alhendín beltway finished. What has allowed that the gabirros and other inhabitants of near localities do not have to pass through the urban center of Alhendín to go to the A-44 direction Motril

=== Bus ===
At the moment there are 4 lines by where the buses of the transport consortium of Granada pass. These are the lines that connect the center of Granada with the municipality

==== Lines ====
Route Line 153 Granada - Cúllar Vega - Vegas del Genil - Híjar Line 156 Granada - Armilla - Churriana de la Vega - Gabia Grande Line 157A Granada - Armilla - Gabia Chica Line 157B Granada - Armilla - Gabia Chica - Gabia Grande

=== Other transport ===
The nearest airport for public use is the provincial airport Federico García Lorca. In the territory of the municipality is located the Armilla Air Base (Wing 78). The subway of Granada connects the municipalities of Albolote, Maracena and Armilla with Granada, in the future could also reach the light metro to Las Gabias. The taxi association of the Belt of Granada provides service 24 hours a day. Politics The results in Las Gabias of the last municipal elections, held in May 2011, are:

== Politics ==
Municipal elections - Las Gabias (2011) Political party Votes %Valids Councilor Popular party (PP) 3.371 44,24% 8 Spanish Socialist Worker's Party(PSOE) 3.305 43,37% 8 United left (IU) 800 10,50% 1

These results supposed an adjusted victory of the Popular Party, although a pact of government between PSOE and IU maintained to Vanessa Polo in the mayoralty. In 2015, the results of the municipal elections were:

Municipal elections - Las Gabias (2015) Political party Votes %Valids Councilor

Spanish Socialist Worker's Party (PSOE) 2.775 34,25% 7

Popular party (PP) 2.325 28,7% 5

Citizen's Party (C´s) 1238 15,28% 3

Now yes- Las Gabias (AHR) 777 9,59% 1

Let's win the Gabias for the people (PG 464 5,73% 1

== Prominent figures ==
- Pedro M. Cátedra, medievalist.
- Estrella Morente (1980), singer daughter of the well-known Enrique Morente.

== See also ==
- List of municipalities in Granada
