= 1956 Atarfe–Albolote earthquake =

1956 earthquake centered in the province of Granada, Spain

1956 Atarfe–Albolote earthquake Terremoto de Atarfe-Albolote de 1956
- Location within Spain
- UTC time: 1956-04-19 16:38:53
- USGS-ANSS: n/a
- Local date: 19 April 1956
- Local time: 18:38:53 CEST (UTC+02:00)
- Magnitude: 5.0 M_{w}
- Depth: 6.3 km (3.9 mi)
- Epicenter: 37.26°N 3.73°W
- Areas affected: Spain
- Max. intensity: MMI VIII (Severe)
- Aftershocks: 116
- Casualties: 12 dead 60 injured

The 1956 Atarfe–Albolote earthquake (Spanish: Terremoto de Atarfe-Albolote de 1956) occurred at 18:38 CEST (16:38 UTC) on 19 April. The magnitude 5.0 M_{w} earthquake affected a wide area, and especially the area between Sierra Elvira and Granada, Spain. According to the press at the time, the towns of Atarfe and Albolote were ruined and Santa Fe, Maracena and some neighborhoods in the capital of Granada were badly affected. The earthquake registered an epicentral intensity of VIII, a magnitude of 5.0 and a hypocentral depth of 6.3 km. Numerous aftershocks occurred, of which the most important were recorded between 19 April and 8 May. Twelve people died and 60 were left injured. Among other effects, the earthquake caused rockfalls in Sierra Elvira and landslides along the Beiro River.

== Geology ==
The province of Granada is located in the morphostructural unit constituted by the Betic Cordilleras, mountainous alignments formed by the stacking of structures pushed by the Iberian plate and African plate. In the Granada Basin, the areas that have suffered the most from the effects of earthquakes, with an intensity equal to or greater than VI, have been those of Alhama de Granada and the Santa Fe-Pinos Puente-Albolote triangle. In the case of the so-called Iznalloz fault, the maximum expected magnitude is 7.0; others may exceed magnitude 6.0.

Throughout the 20th and 21st centuries, several significant earthquakes have occurred in Andalusia. The most notable include the 1910 Adra earthquake, the 1911 Los Granadinos earthquake, the 1930 Montilla earthquake, and the 1932 Vícar earthquake. Significant seismic movements were also recorded in the province of Jaén in 1951, affecting Andújar, Bailén, and Linares; in 1964, in Galera and Orce; the 1993-1994 Adra earthquake swarm; and, more recently, the 2011 Lorca earthquake.

== Earthquake ==
The earthquake began at 18:38 and spread panic especially in the area between Sierra Elvira and Granada, alarming almost the entire province. The following day's press cited the towns of Atarfe and Albolote as ruined, and Santa Fe, Maracena and some neighborhoods of the capital badly affected. They asked the government for help. The human losses totaled 7 direct deaths and 5 due to a landslide next to the Beiro in Granada due to the collapse of a cave, located next to the path of the Casería de Montijo. As a consequence of the earthquake and the effects of the rain, a large crack was made in the hillside. On 20 April at 14:00, some 5,000 m^{3} of earth fell. A married couple with 3 children lived in the cave, they all died. In this same place in 1945 another landslide caused 4 deaths. In addition, there is talk of about 40 injured, several hundred homes destroyed, many others uninhabitable, serious breakdowns and material damage amounting to 20 million pesetas at the time. One of the wounded died on 25 April. These damages were increased by the numerous aftershocks that followed for several weeks. The epicenter was located between Albolote and Atarfe, an area that lacks settlements and crops, so the damage was not increased.

Within a radius of 10 km around, it reached grade VII, which covers the capital and some twenty towns in La Vega. It had a shallow focal depth of 6,3 km.

The violent earthquake lasted about four seconds, causing cracks and detachment of plaster at the joints of the walls and windows, falling objects, stopped watches, etc. In Albolote the walls suffered more, cracks in church columns, rockfall in Sierra Elvira, rupture and fall of chimneys, cornices, movement of trees, general underground noise noticed in quite remote towns. Strange phenomena is described by the population as a current of air, fire and stones coming from the Cañada called Tajo Colorado that seemed to come out of the Raja Santa although a Group of Speleologists from Granada denied it in the press. The earthquake that occurred on 4 June 1955, affected Atarfe and caused material damage. Some people say that they saw a glow of a reddish-yellowish globe in the early hours of the morning.

The most important aftershocks were recorded between 19 April and 8 May. In some days several more or less strong shocks occurred, registering 116 important aftershocks.

== See also ==
- List of earthquakes in 1956
- List of earthquakes in Spain
