= Madinat Ilbira =

Madînat Ilbîra
- Interactive map of Madînat Ilbîra
- 37.238°N 3.708°W
- Location: Atarfe and Pinos Puente, Andalusia, Spain

Madinat Ilbira or Medina Elvira is an archaeological site in the Vega de Granada.

The site, rediscovered in the 19th century, lies across the municipalities of Atarfe and Pinos Puente at the feet of the southern slope of Sierra Elvira. The city or Ilbira (or Elvira) was founded towards the 9th century CE, over previous sparse rural settlements (alquerías) in the area dating back to the 8th century. There is no clear urban continuity with earlier phases of late Roman occupation of the territory. It became the capital of the kūra of the same name. Upon the onset of the early 11th-century fitna of al-Andalus, the incoming Zirid rulers moved their capital to the hitherto ḥiṣn of Garnata, which thereby became the city of Madinat Garnata (Granada), with the result of the depopulation of Ilbira.
