= Cubillas Reservoir =

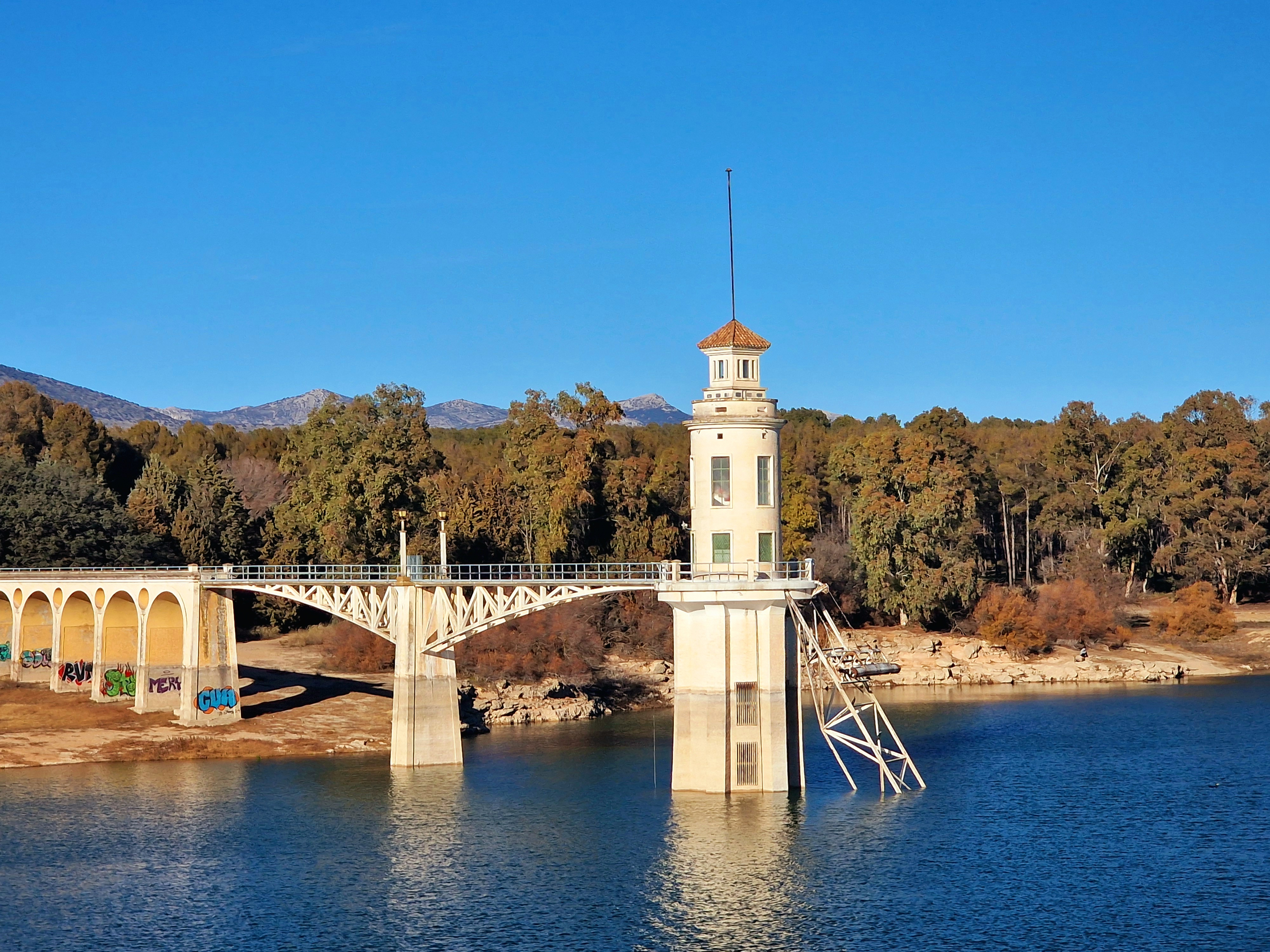

- Location within Spain
- Location: Albolote and Atarfe
- Coordinates: 37°16′34.46″N 3°40′23.56″W
- Type: reservoir
- Primary inflows: Cubillas River
- Basin countries: Spain
- Built: 1956

Cubillas Reservoir is a reservoir in the province of Granada, Spain.

The Cubillas reservoir is placed between Sierra Elvira, the Colomeras mountains, and Sierra Arana (also known as Sierra Harana). The perimeter of the reservoir runs through the municipalities of Albolote and Atarfe in the province of Granada.

The water that supplies the reservoir mainly comes from the river Cubillas, which gives the name to the reservoir. It was built in a shallow valley, in a river which carries many sediments, which further decreased the depth of the valley. Its upper limit is the wall of the dam which connects the river Cubillas with the one from Colomera. Its lower limit is the wall of the dam. Its length is around 2300m; and its width, 800m. Its maximum depth is around 20m.

In the environment surrounding the reservoir, there are areas of crops, olive groves, alleys, vacant lots and abandoned hamlets.

Access to the reservoir is via the old road of Jaén, exit number 116 of the A-44.
