= 1956 Nicaragua earthquake =

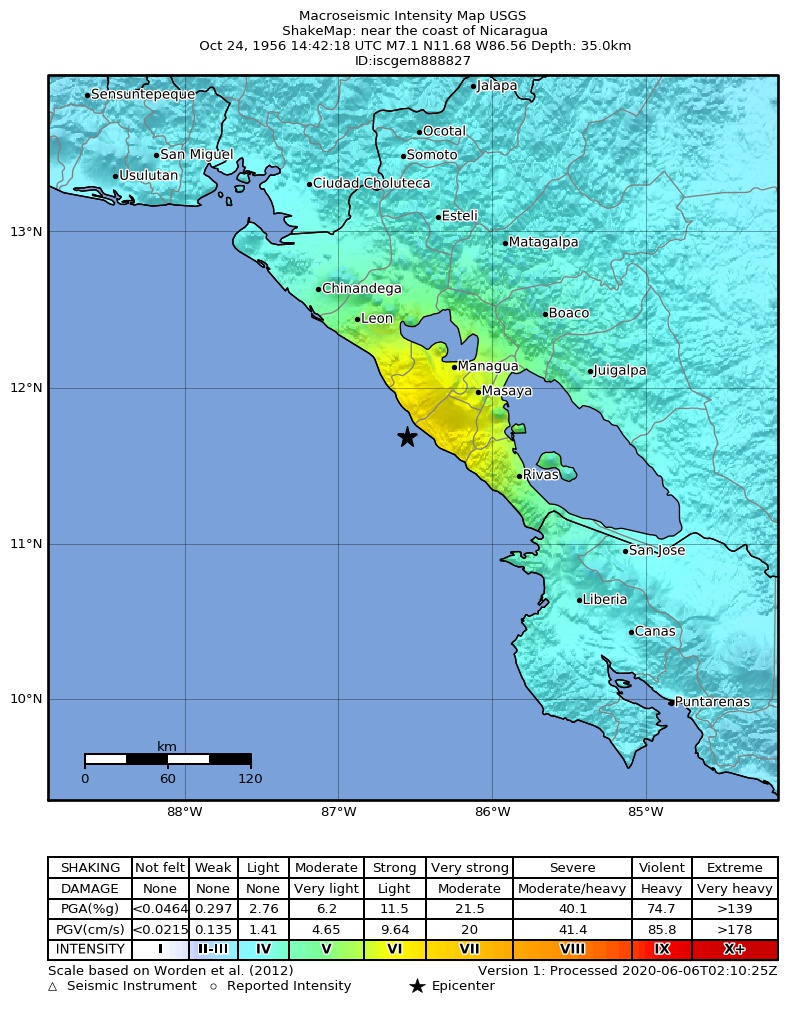
- USGS ShakeMap

- Location within Central America
- UTC time: 1956-10-24 14:42:18
- ISC event: 888827
- USGS-ANSS: ComCat
- Local date: 24 October 1956
- Local time: 1956-10-24 08:42:18
- Magnitude: M_{s} 7.3
- Depth: 25 km (16 mi)
- Epicenter: 11.72°N 86.48°W

The 1956 Nicaragua earthquake occurred on October 24 at 14:42 UTC. The epicenter was located west of Masachapa, Managua Department, Nicaragua. It was an earthquake of magnitude M_{s} 7.3, or M_{w} 7.2. Building damage was reported in Managua. A study of W. Montero P. shows that this earthquake might be related to the earthquake of Nicoya Peninsula on October 5, 1950. A tsunami was triggered by the earthquake.

== See also ==
- List of earthquakes in 1956
- List of earthquakes in Nicaragua
