= 1956 Chim earthquake =

Earthquake

- Location within Lebanon
- UTC time: Doublet earthquake:
- A: 1956-03-16 19:32:43
- B: 1956-03-16 19:43:31
- ISC event
- A: 888079
- B: 888080
- USGS-ANSS
- A: ComCat
- B: ComCat
- Local date: March 16, 1956
- Local time: 21:32:43
- Magnitude
- A: 5.3 M_{w}
- B: 5.5 M_{w}
- Epicenter: 33.78°N 35.58°E
- Areas affected: Lebanon
- Casualties: 136 dead

The 1956 Chim earthquake was a destructive multiple-shock event that occurred on March 16 in Lebanon along a strand of the Dead Sea Transform (DST) fault system. The epicenter was located in the south of Lebanon in the Chouf District. Six thousand homes were destroyed and another 17,000 were damaged. The number of persons killed was 136.

== Tectonic setting ==
The DST is a 1,609 km (1,000 mi) long transform fault that runs in a mostly north–south direction from the northern end of the Red Sea along the Jordan Rift Valley to the Taurus Mountains complex in southern Turkey. The left-lateral fault zone marks the boundary of the Arabian plate and the Sinai-Levantine block and consists of multiple parallel faults. As the fault moves through Lebanon and Syria the fault trace follows a restraining bend and splits into several strands that include the Serghaya, Rachaya, and Roum faults, as well as the prominent Yammouneh fault.

== Earthquake ==
The Roum fault runs for a length of 35 kilometers (22 mi) between the Hula basin the Awali river and is the westernmost strand of the fault system in that area. A paleoseismic trench investigation revealed that it may have been the source of the twin-shock event.

The twin shocks were separated by less than fifteen minutes with the first event occurring at 19:32 and the second event at 19:43 hours. The initial shock was estimated to measure (M_{w} = 5.3) and the second event was rated (M_{w} = 5.5).

== See also ==
- List of earthquakes in 1956
- List of earthquakes in the Levant
