= List of earthquakes in 1956 =

Earthquakes in 1956
Approximate epicenters of the earthquakes in 1956
- 4.0–5.9 magnitude
- 6.0–6.9 magnitude
- 7.0–7.9 magnitude
- 8.0+ magnitude
- Strongest: Greece, Dodecanese Islands (Magnitude 7.7) 9 July
- Deadliest: Iran, Hormozgan Province (Magnitude 6.4) 31 October 347 deaths
- Total fatalities: 910

Number by magnitude
- 9.0+: 0
- 8.0–8.9: 0
- 7.0–7.9: 11
- 6.0–6.9: 104
- 5.0–5.9: 7

This is a list of earthquakes in 1956. Only magnitude 6.0 or greater earthquakes appear on the list. Lower magnitude events are included if they have caused death, injury or damage. Events which occurred in remote areas will be excluded from the list as they wouldn't have generated significant media interest. All dates are listed according to UTC time. Again a fairly active year. 11 magnitude 7.0+ earthquakes were recorded with the largest of those striking Greece in the summer. The event in Greece measured 7.7 and was one of the largest ever to affect the country. In all earthquakes in 1956 resulted in 910 fatalities. Iran had the deadliest event of the year with 347 deaths in October. Spain, Burma, Lebanon, Afghanistan, Greece and India also suffered from deadly events.

== Overall ==
=== By death toll ===
Rank	Death toll	Magnitude	Location	MMI	Depth (km)	Date
1	347	6.4	Iran, Hormozgan Province	VII (Very strong)	15.0	31 October
2	156	6.0	India, Gujarat	IX (Violent)	15.0	21 July
3	148	5.3	Lebanon, Mount Lebanon Governorate	( )	15.0	16 March
4	100	7.3	Afghanistan, Baghlan Province	VII (Very strong)	25.0	9 June
5	56	7.7	Greece, Dodecanese Islands	IX (Violent)	20.0	9 July
6	51	5.5	Greece, Thessaly	VIII (Severe)	15.0	2 November
7	38	6.8	Burma, Sagaing Region	VI (Strong)	34.3	16 July
8	12	5.0	Spain, Southern Spain	VIII (Severe)	6.3	19 April

- Note: At least 10 casualties

=== By magnitude ===
Rank	Magnitude	Death toll	Location	MMI	Depth (km)	Date
1	7.7	56	Greece, Dodecanese Islands	IX (Violent)	20.0	9 July
2	7.6	0	Fiji	IV (Light)	419.1	23 May
3	7.5	0	Japan, Chiba Prefecture, Honshu	VII (Very strong)	66.1	29 September
= 4	7.3	0	Japan, Izu Islands	( )	484.1	18 February
= 4	7.3	100	Afghanistan, Baghlan Province	VII (Very strong)	25.0	9 June
= 4	7.3	0	Soviet Union, Kuril Islands, Russia	VII (Very strong)	100.4	11 October
5	7.2	0	Indonesia, Banda Sea	( )	136.8	18 July
6	7.1	0	Nicaragua off the west coast of Nicaragua	VII (Very strong)	35.0	24 October
= 7	7.0	0	Tonga, south of	( )	35.0	10 January
= 7	7.0	0	Ecuador, Manabí Province	IX (Violent)	20.0	16 January
= 7	7.0	0	Fiji, south of	( )	198.0	27 December

- Note: At least 7.0 magnitude

== Notable events ==
=== January ===
January
- Strongest: 7.0 M_{w} 2 events
- Deadliest: 5.8 M_{w} Hungary; 2 deaths
- Total fatalities: 3

Number by magnitude
- 8.0–8.9: 0
- 7.0–7.9: 2
- 6.0–6.9: 12
- 5.0–5.9: 1

Date	Country and location	M_{w}	Depth (km)	MMI	Notes	Casualties	
Date	Country and location	M_{w}	Depth (km)	MMI	Notes	Dead	Injured
1	Indonesia, Banda Sea	6.5	170.0				
8	Mexico, Guerrero	6.2	20.0	VI	At least 101 people were injured and major property damage was caused.		101+
8	Chile, off the coast of Arica and Parinacota Region	6.6	51.5	VII	At least 1 person was killed and some damage was caused.	1+	
9	Fiji, south of	6.5	610.0				
10	Tonga, south of	7.0	35.0				
11	New Zealand, Taranaki, North Island	6.2	180.0				
12	Hungary, Budapest	5.8	15.0	VII	The 1956 Budapest earthquake struck the eastern suburbs of the city. 2 people were killed and major damage was caused.	2	
14	United States, Andreanof Islands, Alaska	6.0	46.5				
16	Ecuador, Manabí Province	7.0	20.0	IX	Some damage was caused.		
18	Chile, Antofagasta Region	6.2	35.0	VI			
21	Burma, Chin State	6.1	60.0				
23	Soviet Union, off the east coast of Kamchatka, Russia	6.6	75.1				
28	Australia, East New Britain Province, Papua and New Guinea	6.0	50.0	VI			
30	New Zealand, north of North Island	6.4	15.0	V			
31	Australia, New Ireland (island), Papua and New Guinea	6.9	400.0				

=== February ===
February
- Strongest: 7.3 M_{w} Japan
- Deadliest: 6.2 M_{w} Turkey; 4 deaths
- Total fatalities: 4

Number by magnitude
- 8.0–8.9: 0
- 7.0–7.9: 1
- 6.0–6.9: 14

Date	Country and location	M_{w}	Depth (km)	MMI	Notes	Casualties	
Date	Country and location	M_{w}	Depth (km)	MMI	Notes	Dead	Injured
1	United States, Northern Mariana Islands	6.7	370.1				
1	Italy, off the west coast of Calabria	6.2	225.0				
4	United Kingdom, Katavi Region, Tanganyika	6.2	0.0		Unknown depth.		
9	Mexico, Baja California	6.8	6.0	VIII			
9	Mexico, Baja California	6.2	6.0	VIII	Aftershock.		
10	Japan, off the east coast of Honshu	6.1	38.5				
12	Philippines, off the northwest coast of Luzon	6.4	20.7				
13	Philippines, off the northwest coast of Luzon	6.1	15.0		Aftershock.		
14	Philippines, off the northwest coast of Luzon	6.1	15.0		Aftershock.		
14	Mexico, Baja California	6.4	6.0	rowspan="2"| Southeast of previous weeks events. Doublet earthquake.			
15	Mexico, Baja California	6.3	15.0	VII			
18	Japan, Izu Islands	7.3	484.1				
19	Canada, south of Haida Gwaii	6.5	15.0				
20	Turkey, Eskişehir Province	6.2	15.0	VIII	4 people were killed and some damage was caused.	4	
29	Burma, Sagaing Province	6.2	52.7	VI			

=== March ===
March
- Strongest: 6.5 M_{w} 2 events
- Deadliest: 5.3 M_{w} Lebanon; 148 deaths
- Total fatalities: 148

Number by magnitude
- 8.0–8.9: 0
- 7.0–7.9: 0
- 6.0–6.9: 6
- 5.0–5.9: 3

Date	Country and location	M_{w}	Depth (km)	MMI	Notes	Casualties	
Date	Country and location	M_{w}	Depth (km)	MMI	Notes	Dead	Injured
2	New Zealand, Waikato, North Island	5.3	0.0	VII	Some structural damage was caused. Unknown depth.		
3	Tonga	6.5	35.0				
5	China, southern Xinjiang Province	6.1	15.0	VII			
5	Japan, off the north coast of Hokkaido	6.3	20.0	VI			
13	Panama, off the south coast	6.2	25.0	V			
16	Lebanon, Mount Lebanon Governorate	5.3	15.0	rowspan="2"| 148 people were killed and major damage was caused by the 1956 Chim earthquake. Doublet earthquake with 2 events eleven minutes apart.	148		
16	Lebanon, Beqaa Governorate	5.5	15.0	VII			
19	Australia, West New Britain Province, Papua and New Guinea	6.1	50.3	V			
22	Ecuador, Morona-Santiago Province	6.5	86.3				

=== April ===
April
- Strongest: 6.9 M_{w} New Zealand
- Deadliest: 5.0 M_{w} Spain; 7 deaths
- Total fatalities: 7

Number by magnitude
- 8.0–8.9: 0
- 7.0–7.9: 0
- 6.0–6.9: 8

Date	Country and location	M_{w}	Depth (km)	MMI	Notes	Casualties	
Date	Country and location	M_{w}	Depth (km)	MMI	Notes	Dead	Injured
2	Indonesia, northwest of Nias	6.3	29.9	VI			
4	United Kingdom, Singida Region, Tanganyika	6.5	0.0		Unknown depth.		
6	Afghanistan, Badakhshan Province	6.6	214.2				
7	New Zealand, Kermadec Islands	6.9	346.9				
10	Indonesia, southern Sumatra	6.6	129.8				
18	United States, Andreanof Islands, Alaska	6.1	45.0				
19	Spain, Province of Granada	5.0	0.0		The 1956 Atarfe-Albolote earthquake killed 7 people and caused major damage.	7	
22	Australia, East New Britain Province, Papua and New Guinea	6.0	35.0	V			
23	Japan, off the southeast coast of Hokkaido	6.2	35.0	IV			

=== May ===
May
- Strongest: 7.6 M_{w} Fiji
- Total fatalities: 0

Number by magnitude
- 8.0–8.9: 0
- 7.0–7.9: 1
- 6.0–6.9: 6

Date	Country and location	M_{w}	Depth (km)	MMI	Notes	Casualties	
Date	Country and location	M_{w}	Depth (km)	MMI	Notes	Dead	Injured
1	Indonesia, off the west coast of southern Sumatra	6.6	66.0				
13	Pakistan, Punjab, Pakistan	6.1	35.0	VI			
19	Australia, south of Bougainville Island, Papua and New Guinea	6.2	35.0	VI			
22	Tonga	6.3	45.0				
22	Australia, New Ireland (island), Papua and New Guinea	6.2	506.0				
23	Fiji	7.6	419.1	IV			
26	Fiji	6.5	615.0		Aftershock.		

=== June ===
June
- Strongest: 7.3 M_{w} Afghanistan
- Deadliest: 7.3 M_{w} Afghanistan; 100 deaths
- Total fatalities: 100

Number by magnitude
- 8.0–8.9: 0
- 7.0–7.9: 1
- 6.0–6.9: 4

Date	Country and location	M_{w}	Depth (km)	MMI	Notes	Casualties	
Date	Country and location	M_{w}	Depth (km)	MMI	Notes	Dead	Injured
9	Chile, Coquimbo Region	6.6	23.5	VII			
9	Afghanistan, Baghlan Province	7.3	25.0	VII	100 people were killed.	100	
23	Soviet Union, off the east coast of Kamchatka, Russia	6.5	20.0	VI			
24	Australia, southwest of Bougainville Island, Papua and New Guinea	6.0	15.0	IV			
29	Taiwan, off the east coast of	6.2	15.0				

=== July ===
July
- Strongest: 7.7 M_{w} Greece
- Deadliest: 6.0 M_{w} India; 156 deaths
- Total fatalities: 250

Number by magnitude
- 8.0–8.9: 0
- 7.0–7.9: 2
- 6.0–6.9: 11

Date	Country and location	M_{w}	Depth (km)	MMI	Notes	Casualties	
Date	Country and location	M_{w}	Depth (km)	MMI	Notes	Dead	Injured
3	Afghanistan, Badakhshan Province	6.1	215.7				
4	United Kingdom, Solomon Islands	6.0	50.0	V			
9	Greece, Dodecanese Islands	7.7	20.0	IX	The 1956 Amorgos earthquake which was one of the strongest in Greek history caused 53 deaths and major damage. A tsunami resulted in a further 3 deaths.	56	
9	Greece, Dodecanese Islands	6.7	15.0		Aftershock.		
9	Haiti, Nord-Ouest (department)	6.2	55.0	VI			
12	Burma, Magway Region	6.2	90.0				
16	Burma, Sagaing Region	6.8	34.3	VII	38 people were killed and some damage was caused in the 1956 Sagaing earthquake.	38	
17	Indonesia, Banda Sea	6.8	450.8	III			
18	Indonesia, Banda Sea	7.2	136.8				
19	Philippines, off the west coast of Luzon	6.1	35.0	VI			
21	India, Gujarat	6.0	15.0	IX	The 1956 Anjar earthquake left 156 people dead and major damage.	156	
22	Chile, Tarapaca Region	6.1	96.8				
30	Greece, north of Crete	6.1	15.0				

=== August ===
August
- Strongest: 6.5 M_{w} Tonga
- Total fatalities: 0

Number by magnitude
- 8.0–8.9: 0
- 7.0–7.9: 0
- 6.0–6.9: 6
- 5.0–5.9: 1

Date	Country and location	M_{w}	Depth (km)	MMI	Notes	Casualties	
Date	Country and location	M_{w}	Depth (km)	MMI	Notes	Dead	Injured
4	Australia, off the east coast of New Britain, Papua and New Guinea	6.2	35.0	V			
9	Tonga	6.5	288.2				
12	Japan, south of Honshu	6.4	20.0	VI			
15	Indonesia, southern Sumatra	6.4	297.3				
15	Indonesia, Gulf of Tomini	6.3	170.0				
19	China, Shanxi Province	5.0	0.0	VII	A few homes were destroyed. Unknown depth.		
23	Bolivia, La Paz Department (Bolivia)	6.3	35.0	VII			

=== September ===
September
- Strongest: 7.5 M_{w} Japan
- Total fatalities: 0

Number by magnitude
- 8.0–8.9: 0
- 7.0–7.9: 1
- 6.0–6.9: 6

Date	Country and location	M_{w}	Depth (km)	MMI	Notes	Casualties	
Date	Country and location	M_{w}	Depth (km)	MMI	Notes	Dead	Injured
11	Fiji	6.1	15.0				
11	New Hebrides, Vanuatu	6.0	0.0		Unknown depth.		
15	Chile, Tarapaca Region	6.8	94.8				
16	Afghanistan, Paktia Province	6.5	10.0	VIII			
17	United Kingdom, Lake Malawi, Nyasaland	6.0	0.0		Unknown depth.		
19	Burma, Sagaing Region	6.1	114.9				
29	Japan, Chiba Prefecture, Honshu	7.5	66.1	VII			

=== October ===
October
- Strongest: 7.3 M_{w} Soviet Union
- Deadliest: 6.4 M_{w} Iran; 347 deaths
- Total fatalities: 347

Number by magnitude
- 8.0–8.9: 0
- 7.0–7.9: 2
- 6.0–6.9: 13

Date	Country and location	M_{w}	Depth (km)	MMI	Notes	Casualties	
Date	Country and location	M_{w}	Depth (km)	MMI	Notes	Dead	Injured
3	Chile, Tarapaca Region	6.5	97.3				
8	Tonga	6.0	15.0				
10	India, Uttar Pradesh	6.0	15.0				
11	Soviet Union, Kuril Islands, Russia	7.3	100.4	VII			
12	Peru, off the coast of central	6.1	35.0	V			
12	Japan, off the southeast coast of Hokkaido	6.1	35.0				
13	Afghanistan, Badakhshan Province	6.1	100.0				
19	United States, Rat Islands, Alaska	6.5	25.0				
22	Australia, D'Entrecasteaux Islands, Papua and New Guinea	6.2	15.0	VII			
23	Philippines, north of Mindoro	6.7	90.4	VI			
24	Nicaragua, off the west coast of	7.1	35.0	VII	1956 Nicaragua earthquake.		
25	Nicaragua, Carazo Department	6.2	35.0	VI	Aftershock.		
26	New Hebrides, Vanuatu	6.3	10.0	V			
28	Philippines, eastern Luzon	6.3	20.0	VI			
31	Iran, Hormozgan Province	6.4	15.0	VII	347 people were killed and major damage was reported.	347	

=== November ===
November
- Strongest: 6.4 M_{w} Mexico
- Deadliest: 5.5 M_{w} Greece; 51+ deaths
- Total fatalities: 51+

Number by magnitude
- 8.0–8.9: 0
- 7.0–7.9: 0
- 6.0–6.9: 6
- 5.0–5.9: 1

Date	Country and location	M_{w}	Depth (km)	MMI	Notes	Casualties	
Date	Country and location	M_{w}	Depth (km)	MMI	Notes	Dead	Injured
2	Greece, eastern Thessaly	5.5	15.0	VIII	At least 51 people were killed.	51+	
9	Mexico, Veracruz	6.4	148.9				
10	Costa Rica, off the west coast	6.0	70.0				
10	Philippines, central Luzon	6.0	15.0	VII			
16	Venezuela, Merida (state)	6.1	15.0	VII			
21	Japan, off the east coast of Honshu	6.1	41.0				
25	New Hebrides, Vanuatu	6.0	15.0	V			

=== December ===
December
- Strongest: 7.0 M_{w} Fiji
- Total fatalities: 0

Number by magnitude
- 8.0–8.9: 0
- 7.0–7.9: 1
- 6.0–6.9: 12
- 5.0–5.9: 1

Date	Country and location	M_{w}	Depth (km)	MMI	Notes	Casualties	
Date	Country and location	M_{w}	Depth (km)	MMI	Notes	Dead	Injured
3	United States, Fox Islands (Alaska)	6.0	13.6				
4	Mexico, Chiapas	6.0	89.4				
8	United States, Andreanof Islands, Alaska	6.5	25.0				
15	New Hebrides, Vanuatu	6.1	151.3				
16	Colombia, off the west coast of	6.0	32.8	VI			
18	Chile, Antofagasta Region	6.8	44.9	VII			
21	Canada, south of Haida Gwaii	6.5	15.0				
21	Japan, Izu Islands	6.0	15.0	VI			
22	Japan, Izu Islands	6.2	15.0	VI			
23	Japan, Volcano Islands	6.5	90.0				
26	United Kingdom, Santa Cruz Islands, Solomon Islands	6.0	0.0		Unknown depth.		
27	Fiji, south of	7.0	198.0				
28	New Zealand, Gisborne District, North Island	6.5	35.0	VI			
31	China, Hebei Province	5.0	0.0	VI	Some homes were destroyed. Unknown depth.		
