= Cúllar Vega =

- Flag Coat of arms

- Location in Spain.
- Country: Spain
- Autonomous community: Andalusia
- Province: Córdoba

Area
  - Total: 4.35 km^{2} (1.68 sq mi)
- Elevation: 641 m (2,103 ft)

Population (2025-01-01)
  - Total: 7,947
  - Density: 1,830/km^{2} (4,730/sq mi)
- Time zone: UTC+1 (CET)
  - Summer (DST): UTC+2 (CEST)
- Website: www.cullarvega.com

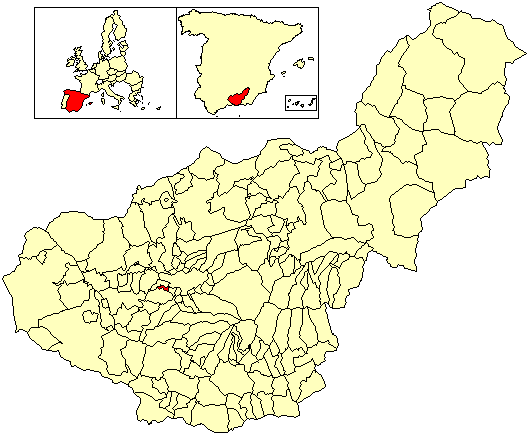
Municipality of Cúllar Vega with respect to the province of Granada.

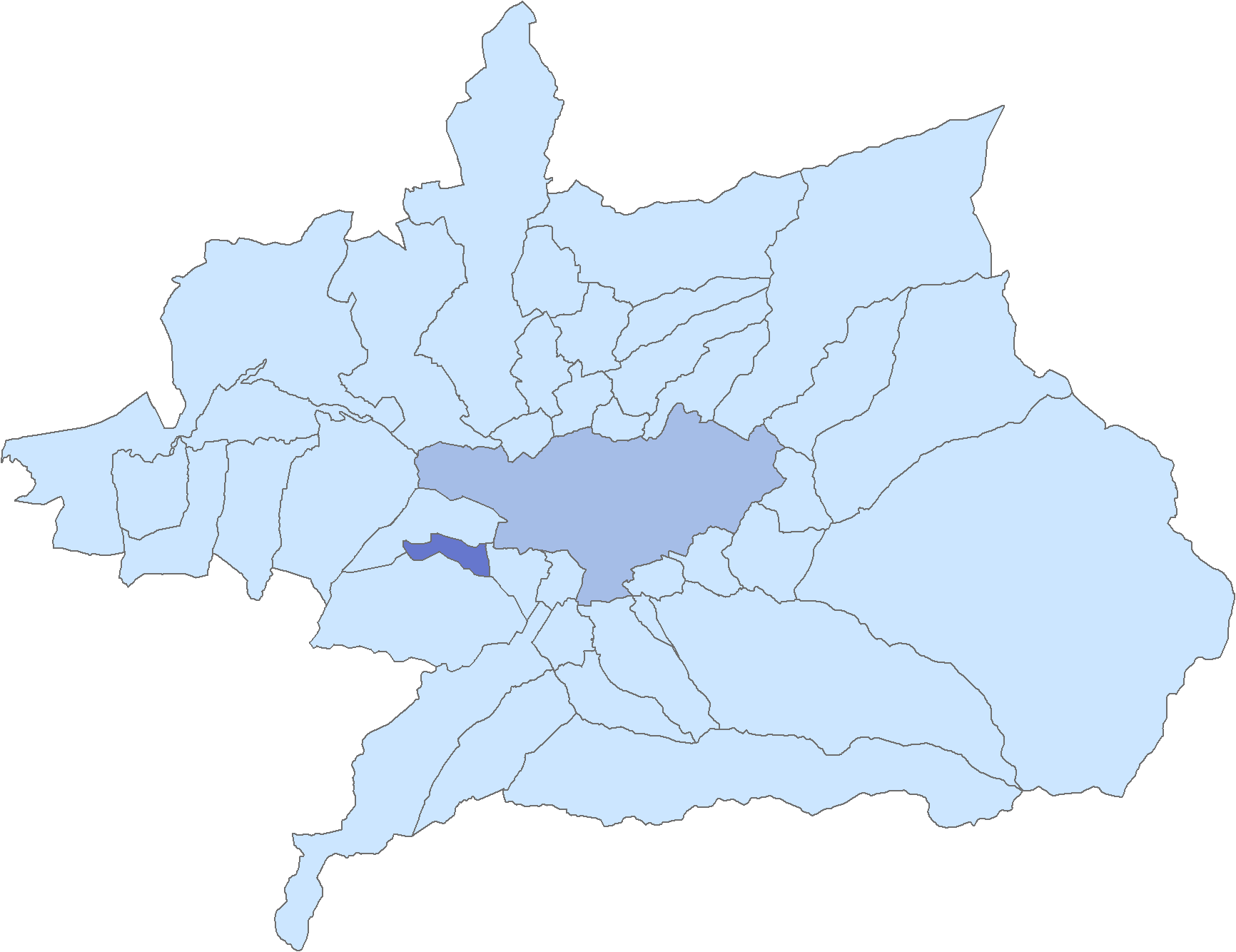
Cúllar Vega (dark purple) in the Vega of Granada to the west of the city of Granada (lighter purple).

Cúllar Vega is a town in Andalusia, Spain. Situated in the central part of the Vega of Granada, in the province of Granada, it borders the municipalities of Vegas del Genil, Churriana de la Vega and Las Gabias.

== Demography ==
According to the National Institute of Statistics of Spain, Cúllar Vega had 7139 registered inhabitants in 2014.

== Governance ==
The municipality was governed from 2003 by the socialist Juan de Dios Moreno. After more than a decade in charge, he resigned in May 2014, being replaced by his party colleague Jorge Sánchez Cabrera.

Municipal elections - Cúllar Vega (2011)
| Political party | Votes | Valid | Councillors |
|---|---|---|---|
| Socialist party Spanish Worker (PSOE) | 1.237 | 39,58% | 6 |
| Popular party (PP) | 1.137 | 36,38% | 5 |
| Left Joined (IU) | 456 | 14,59% | 2 |

== Location ==
| Northwest: Vegas of the Genil | North: Vegas of the Genil | Noreste: Vegas Of the Genil |
| West: Vega of the Genil and The Gabias | East: Churriana of the Vega | |
| Southwest: The Gabias | South: The Gabias | Sureste: The Gabias |

== See also ==
- List of municipalities in Granada
