= Armilla, Granada =

Armilla
- Municipality
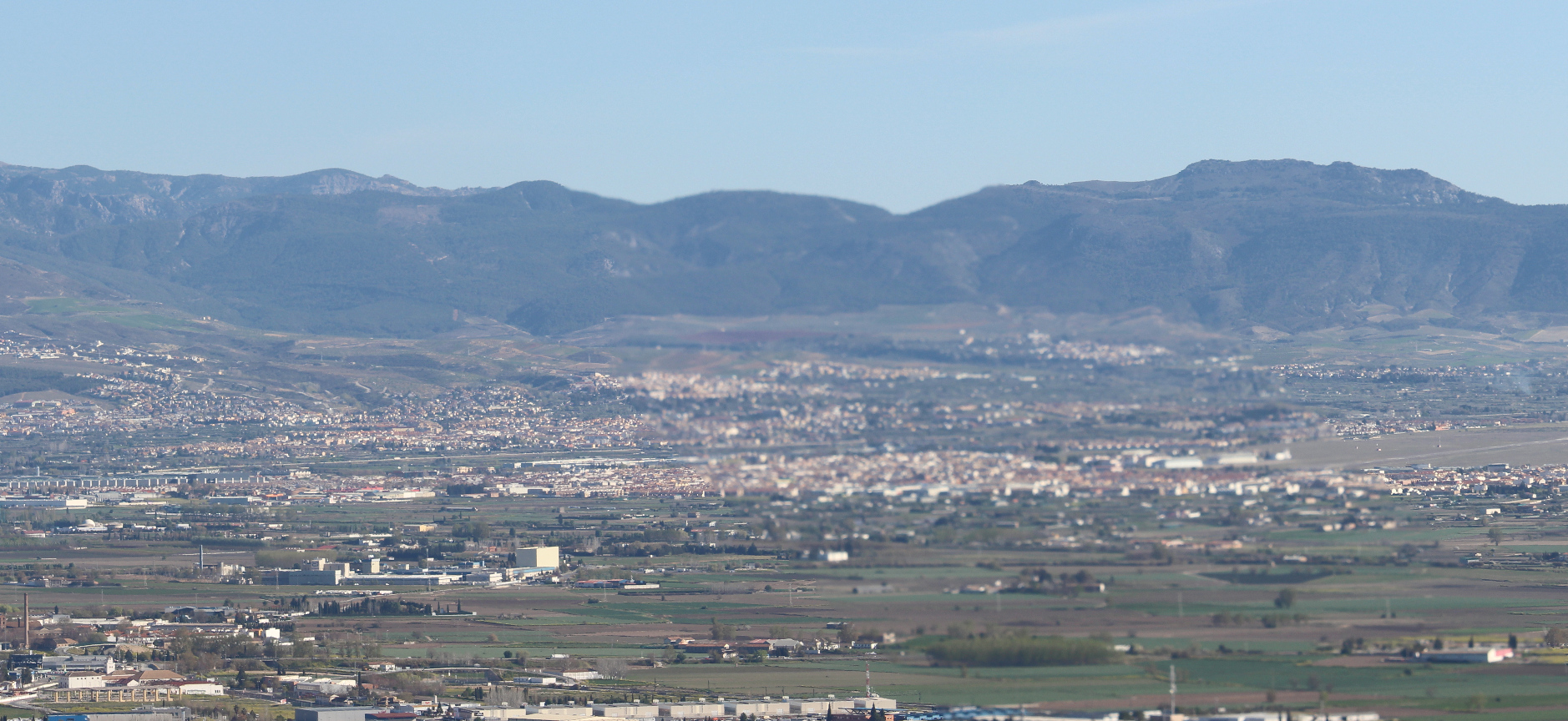

- Coat of arms

- Location in Andalusia Armilla (Andalusia)
- Coordinates: 37°09′N 3°37′W
- Country: Spain
- Autonomous community: Andalusia
- Province: Granada

Population (2025-01-01)
  - Total: 25,300
- Time zone: UTC+1 (CET)
  - Summer (DST): UTC+2 (CEST)

Armilla is a municipality of Spain located in the province of Granada, in the autonomous community of Andalusia. It lies on the Vega de Granada, 4 km from the provincial capital's city centre. Armilla limits with the municipalities of Granada, Ogíjares, Alhendín and Churriana de la Vega.

The biggest population growth registered was in the twentieth century.

== International relations ==
Green Twinning project

- Ilion, Greece (since 2013).

== See also ==
- List of municipalities in Granada
