= Peligros =

Coordinates: 37°14′N 3°38′W

- city
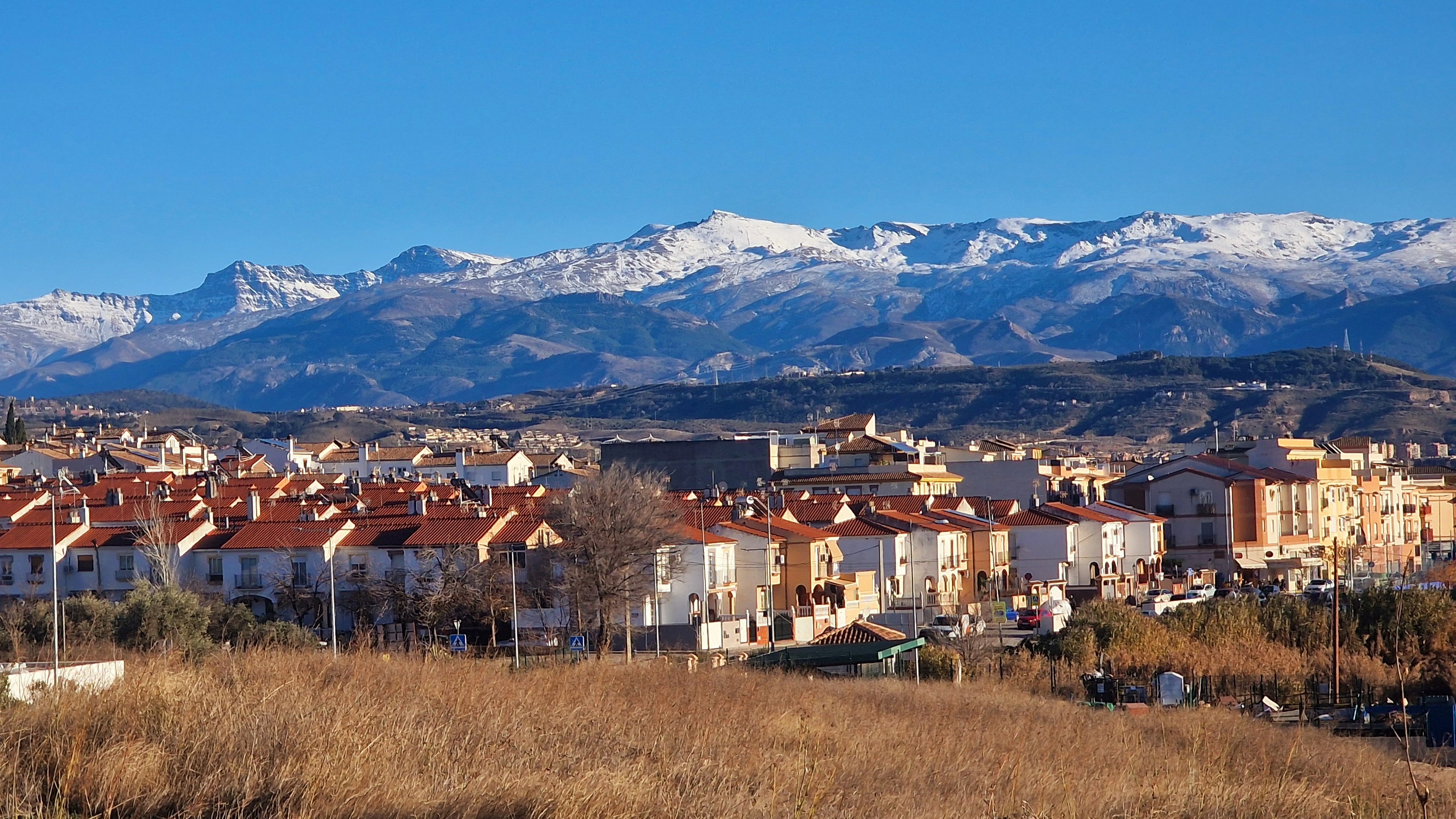

- Flag Coat of arms

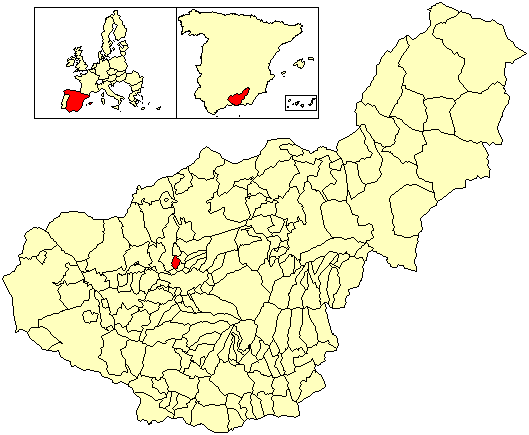
- Location of Peligros
- Country: Spain
- Province: Granada
- Municipality: Peligros

Area
  - Total: 9 km^{2} (3.5 sq mi)
- Elevation: 680 m (2,230 ft)

Population (2025-01-01)
  - Total: 11,725
  - Density: 1,300/km^{2} (3,400/sq mi)
- Time zone: UTC+1 (CET)
  - Summer (DST): UTC+2 (CEST)

Peligros is a municipality located in the province of Granada, Spain. According to the 2013 census (INE), the city has a population of 11,126 inhabitants. It is located next to Pulianas, Maracena, Albolote, Calicasas and Güevejar. It includes a small urbanization called Monteluz.

Peligros is one of the fifty two entities that compose the Metropolitan Area of Granada. In 2013 it had 11,126 inhabitants. Its surface area is about 10 km^{2} and it has population density of 1097.24 inhabitants per km^{2}. It is at an altitude of 680 meters above sea level, and is 5 km from the centre of Granada.

== History ==
The name of the municipality comes from the word Paluculum, a Latin term of the Roman Empire. This word means "place where you can find a lake with hazardous floods of water."

Some centuries after, the Muslims (trying to reach the Northern part of Spain) transformed the place, and renamed it as "Bericulos." Finally, the name was influenced in Peligros by the Spanish language.

It is known that there were Roman settlements, and during the Muslim domination it was a farmstead from "La Vega." In 1431, it was the site of the battle of "La Higueruela" between Christians and Muslims. Here, the army of Granada lost more than 10,000 men.

After the ejection of the Moors, Peligros' population suffered a decline to a hundred of inhabitants, and its development took place during the 18th century.

== Population ==
When the Reconquest finished and the settlement of the owners was normalized at their respective places, of the 20 families who returned to Peligros, 16 were of Muslim origin, the other 4 were Christians. Between the last decade of the 15th century and 1578, the population did not change.

At the time the moors were expelled, there were only 5 families in the village, but 16 more settlers arrived. In 1578 the population was of 21 families with 84 total people. in the 17th century there were 57 vecinos, but in 1840 the population had increased by 200%, so 157 vecinos.

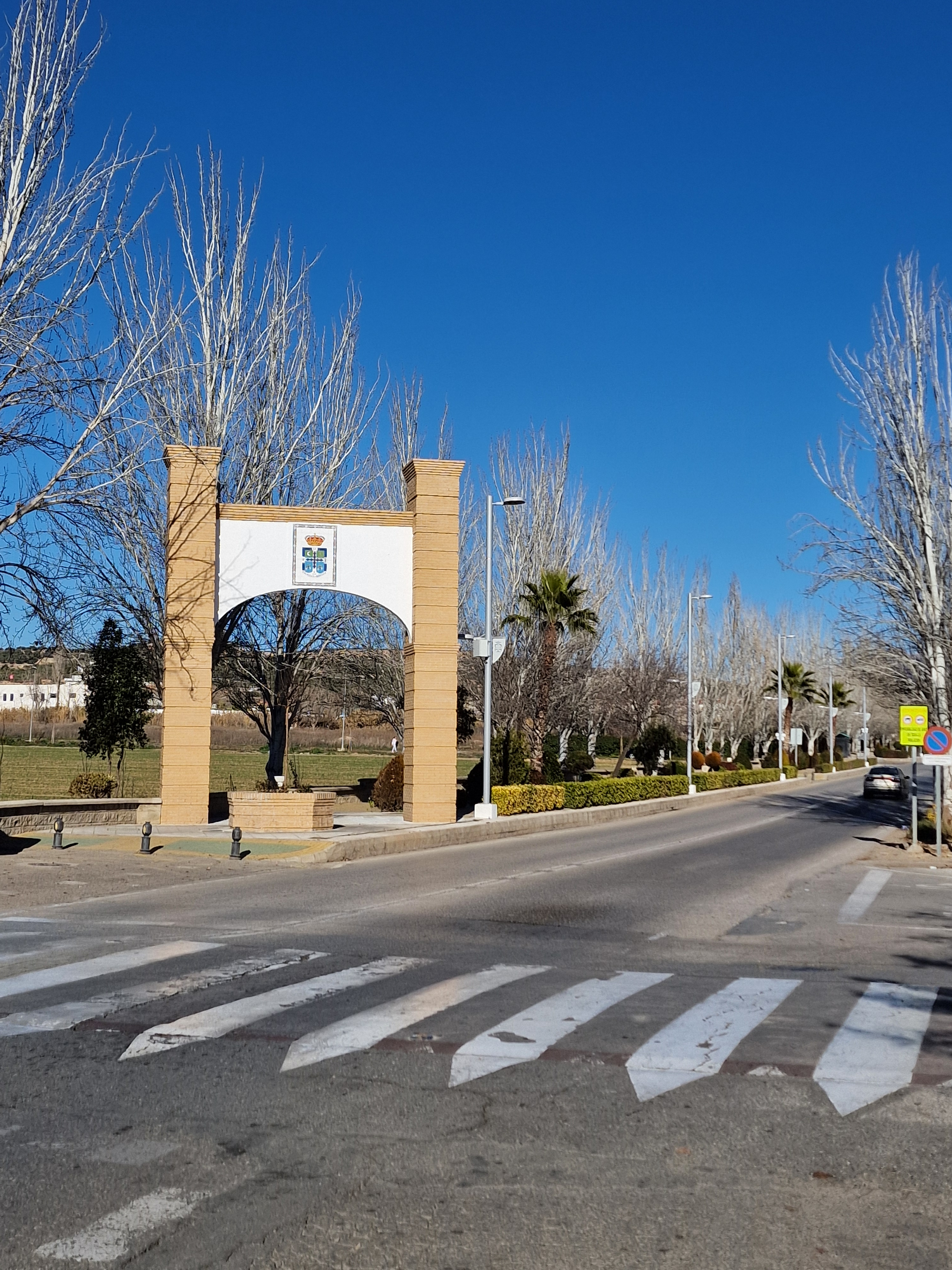
Peligros

Nowadays there is a population of 10,385 inhabitants, due to its proximity to the city of Granada, like many other towns in the metropolitan area, has become a "dormitory town", has been developed enough, both in population and infrastructure. 1.81% of the registered population is foreign (189 inhabitants), mostly from Morocco, although lately there are many Portuguese and Latin, mostly building workers.

Its economy is mainly based on agriculture (oats, melons, olive oil) and trade (with 1,221 places) that employ about 1,080 employees. The labor market in 2006 recorded an unemployment rate of about 442 unemployed and about 5,339 contracts of which about 690 are undefined. Household disposable income per capita is between €9,300 and €10,200.

== Events ==
- On 19 April 1956, there was an earthquake in Albolote. Thirteen people died. Due to the proximity between both municipalities, Peligros also suffered. A general alarm was raised, objects fell down, and about 400 houses were affected to some extent. However, only 50 of the houses had big fissures and 7 of them were abandoned due to danger of collapse.
- The now-empty neighborhood of Las Cuevas suffered from several floods. On one occasion, due to torrential rains, a couple (not from Peligros), were found drowned inside their car between Guevéjar and Granada.

== Politics ==
The results of the last municipal elections in Peligros, in May 2015, were:

Municipal Elections - Peligros (2015)
Political party	Votes	%	Councilors
Ganemos Peligros Para la Gente (PG)	2,552	49.64%	9
Partido Socialista Obrero Español (PSOE)	1,331	25.89%	4
Partido Popular (PP)	1,148	22.33%	4

== Places of interest ==
- The parish church of San Ildefonso (set in the square "25 de mayo") created in the 16th century in Moorish style was built over a mosque, and suffered from several reforms:
  - In 1522 the first one.
  - The second one was done by Villegas from 1561 to 1568.
  - In 1610, Vico restored the roof.
  - In 1625, Francisco Potes y Martín de Escobar reformed it.
  - In 1656, Juan Sarabia y Juan Marín made the most important reform.
  - A century after, there have been other reforms such as a new roof, the priest's house, the automatics bells, etc.
  - It has an altarpiece (baroque style) from 1755, and two important images: a crucifixion from José de Mora school, and a "Inmaculada Concepción" from Alonso Cano.
- The new church of "Ntra, Sra del Rosario" inaugurated 6 April 2003, in modern style, and it situated among "Casasnuevas".
- The "Casa Árabe," with a moorish style, is an important building from the 19th century in the alleged medieval gate of Granada. It is a small fortress. Next to it there is the "Fuente de los Patos" and a municipal park with an amphitheater.

== Culture and sports ==
- Peligros has a football team, Vandalia C.F.
- A regular newspaper, "Peligros", is connected with the newspaper "Ideal". There are also three schools, one college and some nurseries.

== Sister cities ==
- Miyek, Western Sahara
- Parral, Chile

== See also ==
- List of municipalities in Granada
