= Monteluz =

Locality in Granada, Spain

Coordinates: 37°14′N 3°38′W

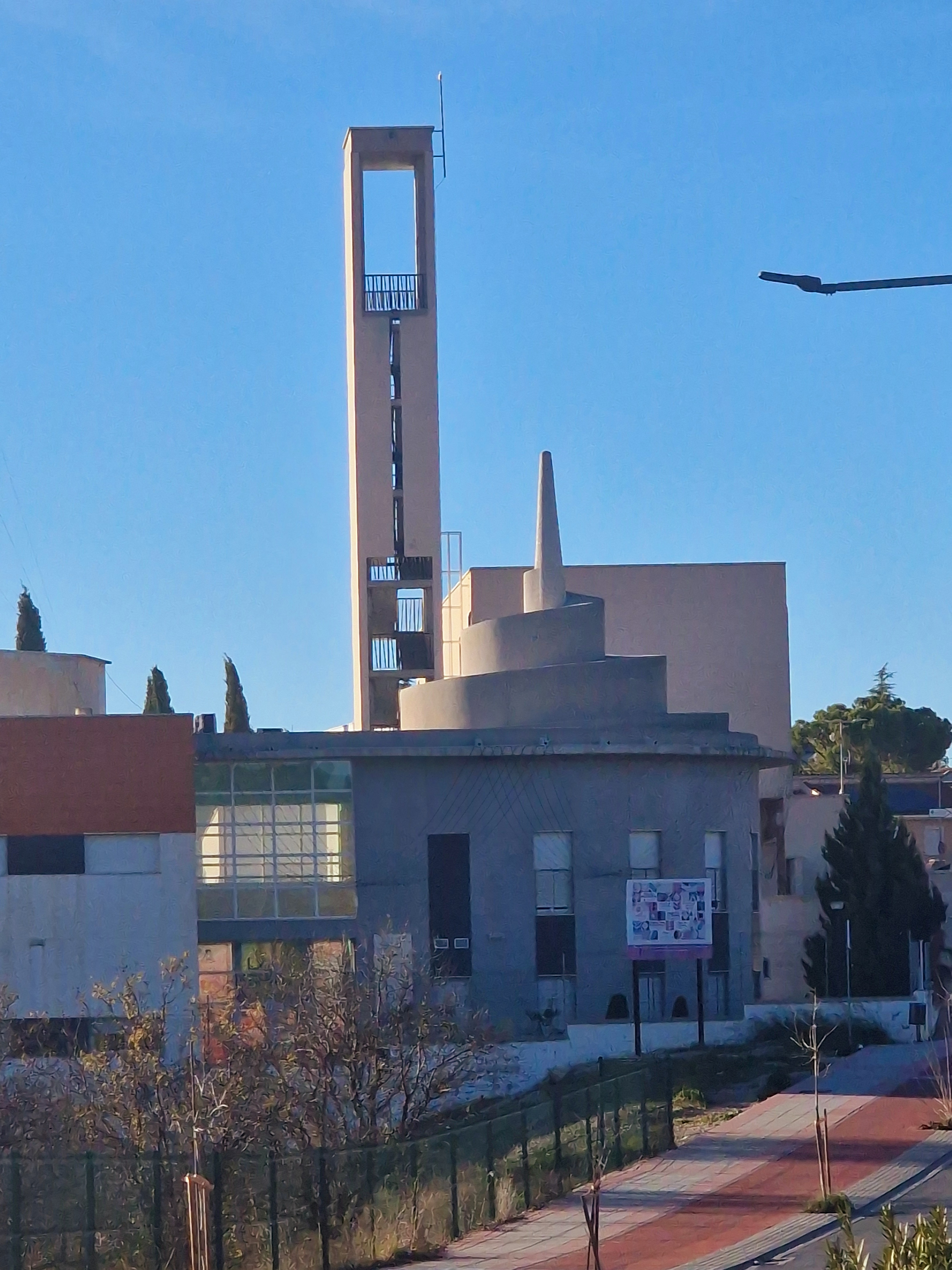
Chapel of St. Gema, in Monteluz

Monteluz is a locality belonging to the municipality of Peligros in the province of Granada, Spain. It is placed in the central part of the region of the Vega of Granada. Near this locality are Albolote's Cores, El Aire and El Chaparral. It started being constructed in the 80s, very close to the knot of the GR-30 and A-92 motorways. The majority of the roads in this locality receive diverse names of trees, except for Monteluz avenue and Jupiter street.

According to the National Institute of Statistics of Spain, Monteluz counted 1,154 inhabitants in 2011.
