= Atarfe =

- Municipality
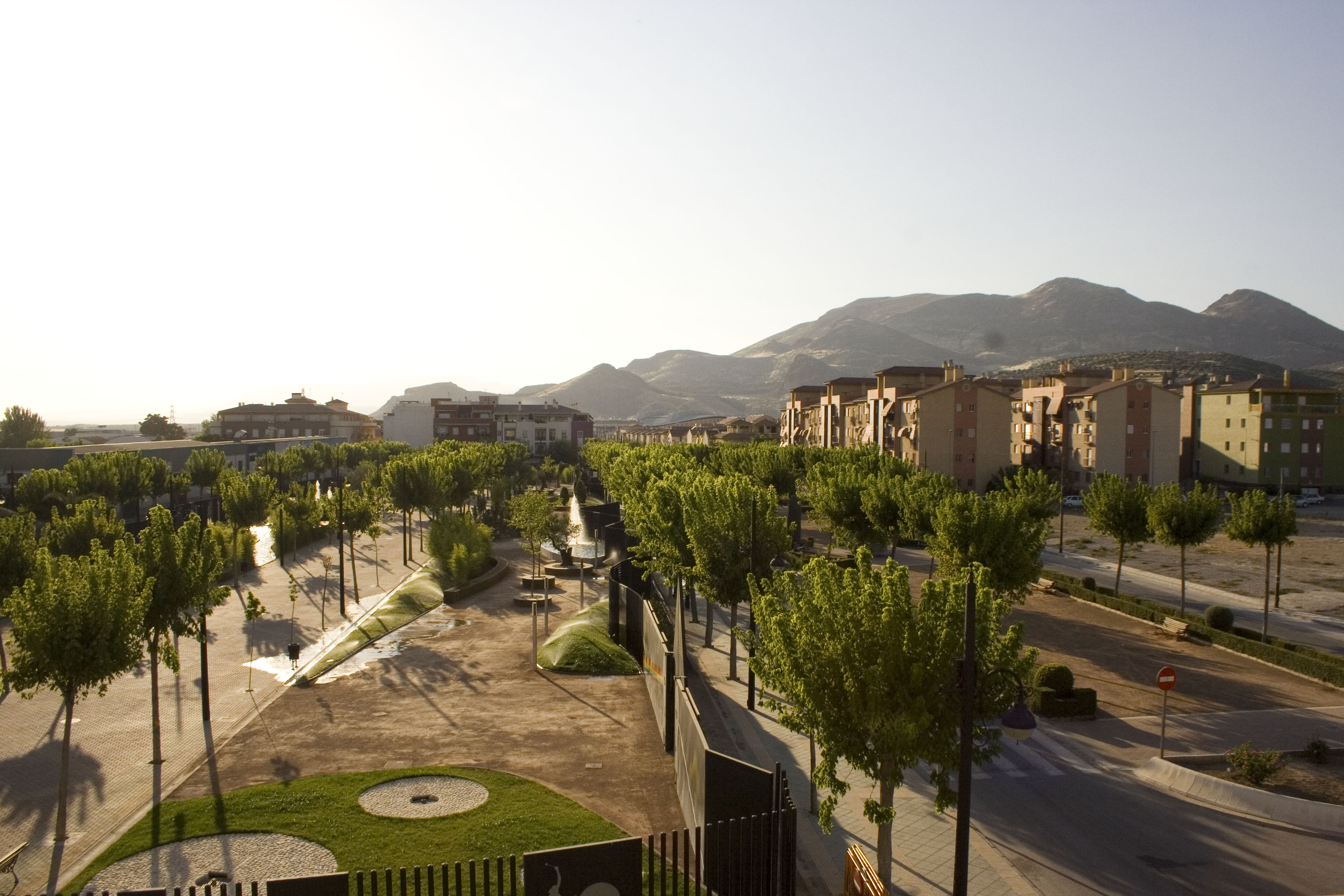
- View of the city showing its Pink Floyd park and surrounding mountains.

- Flag Coat of arms

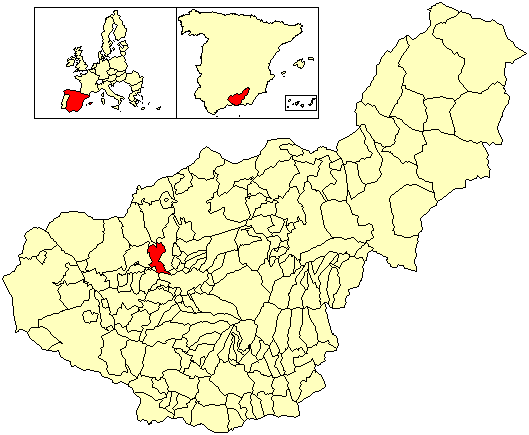

- Location in Spain
- Coordinates: 37.2229°N 3.6899°W
- Country: Spain
- Autonomous community: Andalusia
- Province: Granada
- Comarca: Vega de Granada
- Judicial district: Granada

Government
  - Alcalde: Francisco Rodríguez Quesada (2015) (Por Atarfe Sí)

Area
  - Total: 47 km^{2} (18 sq mi)
- Elevation: 602 m (1,975 ft)

Population (2025-01-01)
  - Total: 20,914
  - Density: 440/km^{2} (1,200/sq mi)
- Demonym(s): Atarfeño, ña
- Time zone: UTC+1 (CET)
  - Summer (DST): UTC+2 (CEST)
- Postal code: 18230
- Website: Official website

Atarfe is a Spanish city in the north central part of the Vega of Granada in the province of Granada, Andalusia. It borders the municipalities of Moclín, Colomera, Albolote, Maracena, Granada, Santa Fe, and Pinos Puente. By this village run the Rivers Cubillas and Colomera. Its districts include Caparacena, Sierra Elvira, Hurpe and Cubillas.

== History ==
The Granada dictionary of toponyms by Amador Diaz Garcia and Manuel Barrios Aguilera says that its name comes from the Arabic «الطَّٰرَفْ» —at-Tāraf—, which in the Granadan dialect would be «الطَّرْفِة» —at-Tárfeh—, meaning "strut", probably related to its Castillejo and Colorao peaks.

This view is also shared by the linguist Jesus Martinez del Castillo. Other views situate its origin in the artarf Arabic word which means limit, as it was the limit in the vicinity of the city of Elvira. There seems to be, as some have thought, a Moorish dynasty Tarfe, a close relative of the kings of Granada. The first civilizations that settled into the soil date from the Neolithic, Iberian and Roman close to them, under whose domination Ilíberis city was founded in the foothills of Sierra Elvira. During the Caliphate, the city was renamed Elvira, and achieved great splendor as the capital of the Kūra, one of the most important of Al-Andalus.

The decisive Battle of Higueruela between the troops of Juan II and King Muhammed IX of Granada took place a short distance from the city center of the village, precisely in the annex of Sierra Elvira. In July 1486, during the Battle of the Acequia Gorda, where died Martin Vazquez de Arce, better known as the Doncel Siguenza. It definitively became a Castilian power after the battle.) At the church, in around 1570, the Moors of Albolote, Atarfe, Armilla, Belicena and Pinos Puente, met in order to be ken to Castile.

== Politics ==
Atarfe results of the last municipal elections, held on May 24, 2015 :

Municipal elections – Atarfe (2015)
Politic party	Votes	%Válids	Councilors
Por Atarfe Sí (PASI)	2.583	34,71%	6
Partido Socialista Obrero Español (PSOE)	2.0035	27,35%	5
Partido Popular (PP)	965	12,97%	2
Ciudadanos (C's)	907	12,19%	2
Ganemos Atarfe para la gente (PG)	853	11.46%	2 2

Atarfe results of the municipal elections of 2011:

Municipal elections – Atarfe (2011)
Politic Party	Votes	%Valids	Councilors
Partido Socialista Obrero Español (PSOE)	3.127	42,42%	7
Partido Popular (PP)	2.445	33,16%	6
Izquierda Unida (IU)	1.581	21,44%	4

== Monuments ==
Church of the Incarnation. Erected as a copy of the Metropolitan Church of Granada promoted in 1501, stands on the place where the old mosque Xini was, as published in the Book of Hábices. In 1617 it consisted of a single nave, which still maintains its coffered ceiling tracery conducted by Antonio Bermudez and Christopher Calvo, from the Granada school.

By 1642, three ships midpoint were built, with triumphal arches, made of brick and masonry, like the three gates. Inside there are 12 frames of the Granada Baroque school, called " apostolada series "which can be dated from 1700. Also dated from this year are the tabernacle and pulpit, the latter topped with a sculpture of the Faith.

Santa Ana hermitage. St. Of the town. The chapel is located in what was the Convent of the Order of St. Paul of the Cross, northwest from downtown. After the abandonment of the Convent, the area became the municipal cemetery and once it moved to its current location, the convent chapel became the patron saint, Santa Ana.

Monument to the Sacred Heart of Jesus, in front of the Chapel of Santa Ana, made of stone from Sierra Elvira, by a local sculptor from Granada, Antonio Cano Correa in 1940.

Hermitage of the Three Johns . A local devotee of the Three Johns (Saint John Baptist, Saint John Evangelist and Saint Juan de Dios ), the chapel was erected in the first half of the twentieth century, on the ruins of an old Moorish castle in Cerro del Castillejo. After the death of its creator, construction froze and did not have a religious use. At the end of the century, the town hall finished the work to use it as a civic place, such as a viewing point. The surrounding areas have exotic animals such as peacocks.

== Celebrations and festivities ==
- Local celebrations: They are celebrated around July 26, the festivity of Santa Ana, with cultural and recreational activities for adults and children. During these, bullfights are held at the Coliseo Ciudad Atarfe, a covered bullring, one of the few in Spain.
- Gastronomy: Although today the local gastronomy has become known in the area, it is worth to mention, quince jelly and pipirrana, products of home slaughter", porridge croutons" and maimones soup of tata Frasquita.

== 1956 earthquake ==
On 19 April 1956, Atarfe and the neighboring city of Albolote were struck by a M_{w} 5.0 earthquake, Spain's most destructive of the 20th century. Twelve people died from the earthquake and subsequent landslide, and many of the city's buildings were ruined.

== Pink Floyd park ==
Atarfe is known for its music concerts. In 2008, Roger Waters, a former member of the band Pink Floyd, played there, resulting in a public park dedicated to Pink Floyd being created by the council.

== Coliseo de Atarfe ==
Other notable music acts have played in Atarfe, including Placebo, Mark Knopfler and Leonard Cohen, either playing in the Coliseo de Atarfe football stadium or outdoors in the Recinto de Feria. The Coliseo also hosts corridas where top bullfighters such as El Fandi, El Cordobes and Paquirri appear.

== See also ==
- List of municipalities in Granada
- Madinat Ilbira
