= Maracena =

Coordinates: 37°12′N 3°38′W

Maracena, Spain
- city
- Flag Coat of arms

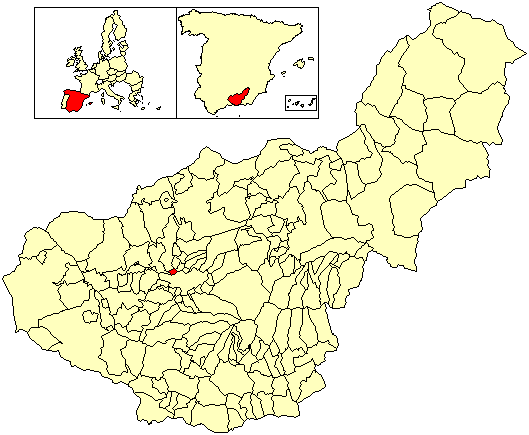
- Location of Maracena
- Country: Spain
- Province: Granada
- Municipality: Maracena

Area
  - Total: 5 km^{2} (1.9 sq mi)
- Elevation: 660 m (2,170 ft)

Population (2025-01-01)
  - Total: 22,294
  - Density: 4,500/km^{2} (12,000/sq mi)
- Time zone: UTC+1 (CET)
  - Summer (DST): UTC+2 (CEST)

Maracena is a municipality located in the province of Granada, Spain. According to the 2005 census (INE), the city has a population of 18819 inhabitants. It is located in the central part of the Vega de Granada, being one of the fifty-two entities that make up the metropolitan area of Granada.It borders the municipalities of Peligros, Pulianas, Granada, Atarfe and Albolote. Other nearby towns are Pulianillas and Monteluz.

The Granada metro, provides the town with a light metro link to central Granada and other towns of the Granada Metropolitan Area..

== History ==
Maracena history goes back to the etymology of the name, in Roman times. In the 1970s was found in the municipality, in Casería Titos, a tablet with a Latin inscription dating back to the 2nd century. Under Muslim rule in Maracena was born one of the most famous Arab leaders, Hamdum ibn Sawar, who had built a watchtower on the hill of La Sabika, where today stand Bermejas Torres.

Some centuries later, the Aragonese king Alfonso (El batallador), reached Maracena. In Maracena took also place the battle of the Higuerela, Before the Catholic Monarchs reconquered Granada. Maracena is near Albolote and Peligros. In Christian times there was significant recruitment of people from the north of Castilla, La Rioja and Navarra, while the Moorish were expelled from the peninsula.

During the 18th century there were several cholera epidemics. They ended up with much of the population. They almost ended with the Vega. During the time that Maracena was devoted almost exclusively to growing grapes, it had twenty wineries.

In the 19th century the phylloxera plague that struck authentic vines Granada, attracting a new crop: beet maracenera changing economy.

Since the late 20th century is a thriving town Maracena, prominent residential locality and central belt of the capital for their active economic, cultural and sporting life mainly cycling, football, fencing, wrestling and running.

== Politics ==
The results in Maracena of the last municipal elections, held in May 2011 are:

political parties: (PSOE): votes (5.372), valid (54, 35%) y councilors(12). PP: votes (2.730), valid (27,62%) y councilors (6).

== See also ==
- List of municipalities in Granada
