= Alhendín =

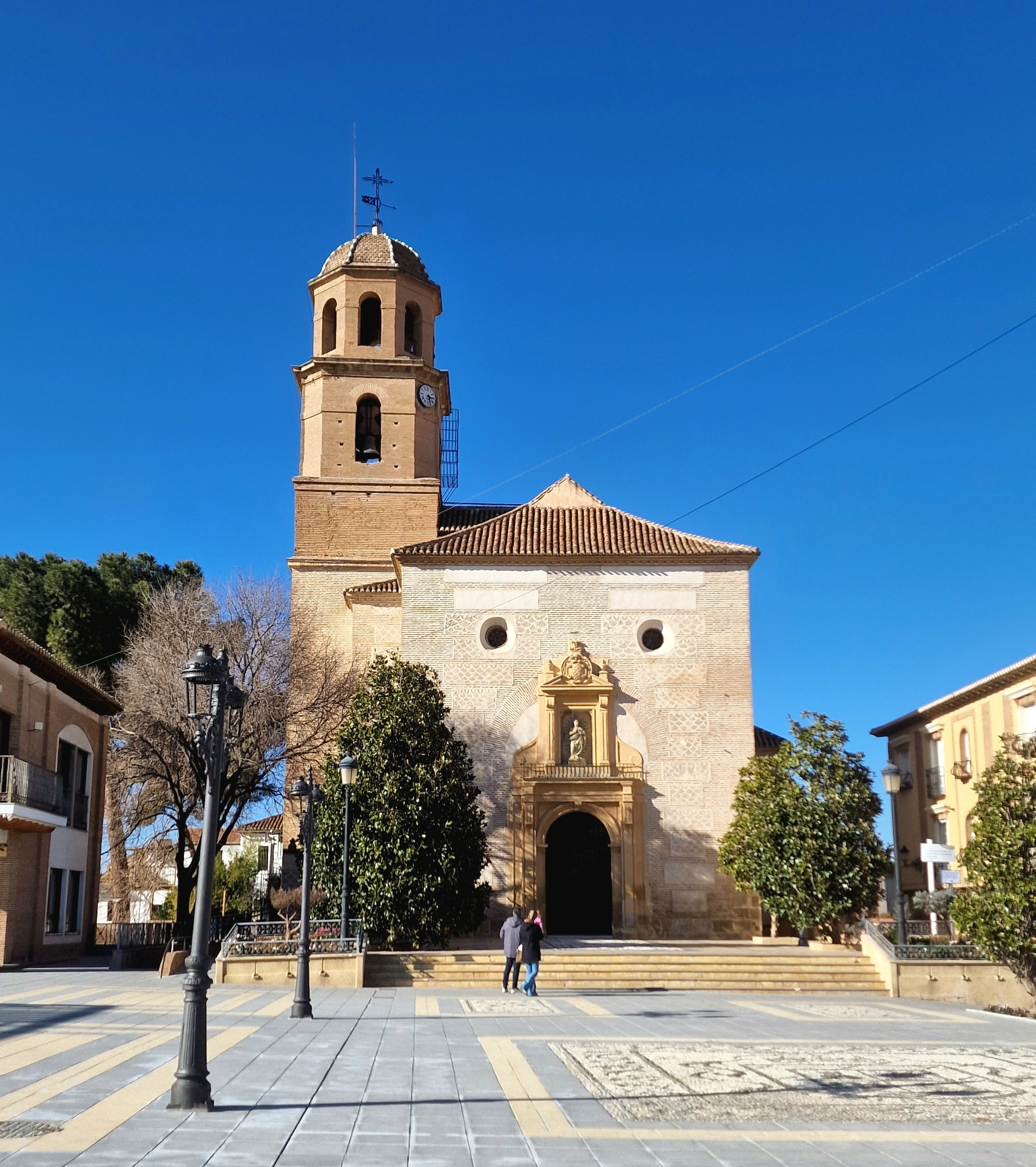

- Flag Coat of arms

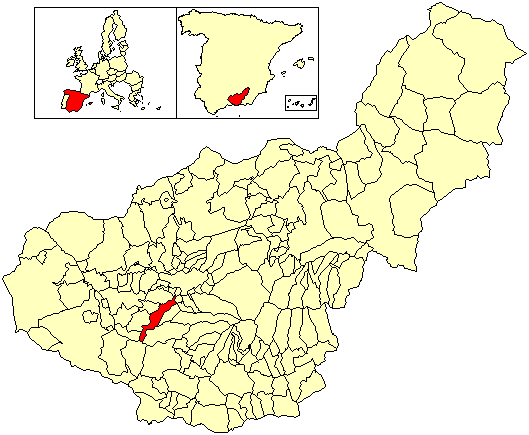
- Location of Alhendín
- Coordinates: 37°07′N 3°39′W
- Country: Spain
- Province: Granada
- Comarca: Vega de Granada

Area
  - Total: 50.81 km^{2} (19.62 sq mi)
- Elevation: 739 m (2,425 ft)

Population (2025-01-01)
  - Total: 10,475
  - Density: 206.2/km^{2} (534.0/sq mi)
- Time zone: UTC+1 (CET)
  - Summer (DST): UTC+2 (CEST)
- Salve Imperator, Morituni te salutan

Alhendín is a city located in the province of Granada, Spain. According to the 2005 census (INE), the city had a population of 5,200 inhabitants.

== See also ==
- List of municipalities in Granada
