= Pinos Puente =

Pinos Puente, Spain
- city
- Flag Coat of arms

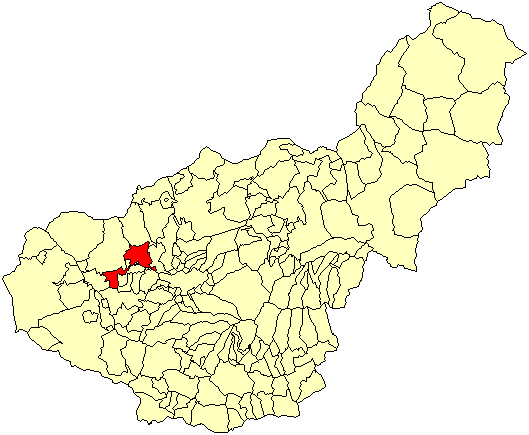
- Location of Pinos Puente
- Coordinates: 37°15′N 3°45′W
- Country: Spain
- Autonomous community: Andalusia
- Province: Granada
- Comarca: Vega de Granada

Area
  - Total: 99 km^{2} (38 sq mi)
- Elevation: 576 m (1,890 ft)

Population (2025-01-01)
  - Total: 9,807
  - Density: 99/km^{2} (260/sq mi)
- Time zone: UTC+1 (CET)
  - Summer (DST): UTC+2 (CEST)

Pinos Puente is a municipality located in the province of Granada, Spain. According to the 2005 census (INE), the city has a population of 13319 inhabitants. The Cubillas River runs by the town.

== Etymology ==
The town's name refers to pine or fir groves of which there is a small outcrop within a clearing.

== See also ==
- List of municipalities in Granada
