= Albolote =

- City
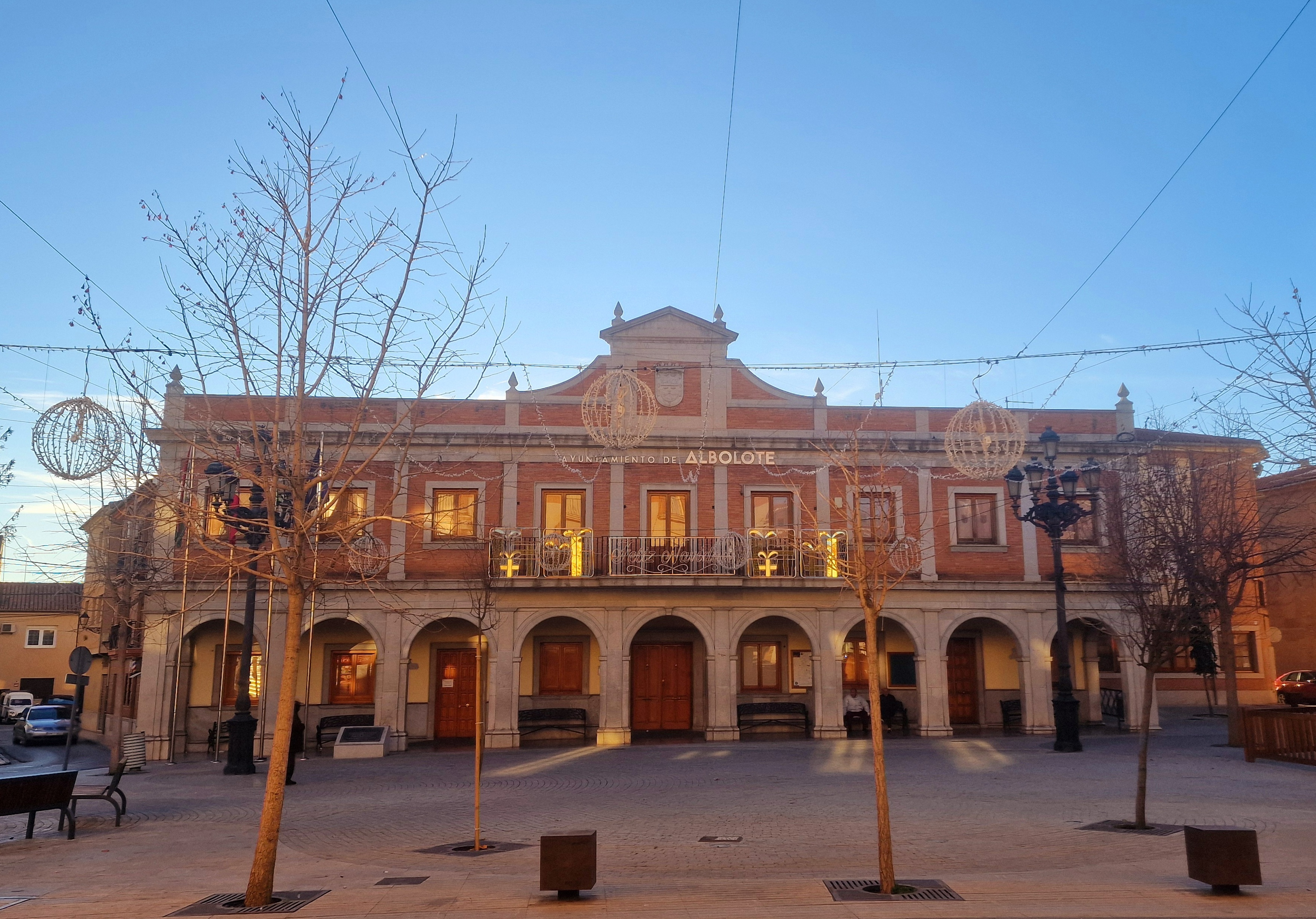

- Flag Coat of arms

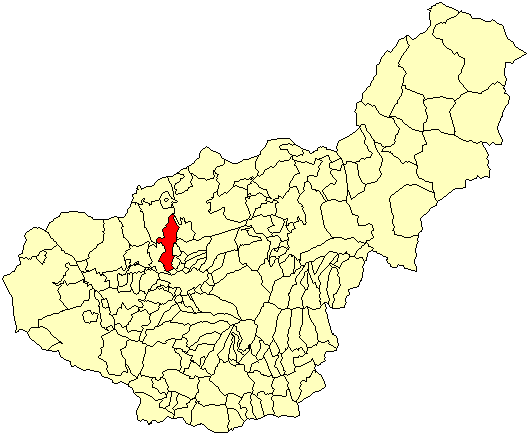
- Location of Albolote
- Coordinates: 37°13′50″N 3°39′25″W
- Country: Spain
- Province: Granada
- Comarca: Vega de Granada
- Municipality: Albolote

Area
  - Total: 79 km^{2} (31 sq mi)
- Elevation: 655 m (2,149 ft)

Population (2025-01-01)
  - Total: 19,768
  - Density: 250/km^{2} (650/sq mi)
- Time zone: UTC+1 (CET)
  - Summer (DST): UTC+2 (CEST)
- Website: http://www.albolote.org/portal/

Albolote is a city located in the province of Granada, Spain. It is one of the thirty-four entities which together form Granada's Metropolitan Area. It is formed by several populations: El Aire, El Chaparral, and Parque del Cubillas y Pretel. There are also several residential areas throughout the legal borders of the municipality. Inside those limits you can also find Granada's Penitential Center (Centro Penitencial de Granada, in Spanish). According to Spain's Instituto Nacional de Estadística, the city had a total population of 15,563 in 2005.

On 19 April 1956, Albolote and the neighboring town of Atarfe were struck by a 5.0 earthquake, Spain's most destructive of the 20th century. About a dozen people died from the earthquake and subsequent landslide, and many buildings were ruined.

The Granada metro network, which opened in 2017, provides the town with a light metro link to central Granada.

== History ==
Albolote was born as a town with the arrival of the Nasrid dynasty to the Emirate of Granada. The term comes from the Arabic term 'Qaryat al-Bollut', meaning 'Oak town' It was planned to be a place of rest for the troops guarding the Royal Path of Jaén. Near Albolote took place the Battle of La Higueruela on July first 1431, where king's Juan II of Castille's troops defeated the Muslim armies. This battle was illustrated at the Monastery El Escorial.

In the 17th century it changed to be an estate of Don Antonio Álvarez de Bohórquez, the first marquis de los Trujillos. In the year 1803 the king, Carlos IV gave the title of Duque de Gor to Don Nicolás Mauricio Álvarez de Bohórquez.

== Geography ==
There are four rivers which flow through Albolote: Juncaril, Colomera, Cubillas, and Magon. It is also worth mentioning the Cubillas reservoir, dedicated both to leisure and water reserve.

== Climate ==
Albolote enjoys a mediterranean climate: fresh winters and hot summers. There's a great thermic oscillation varying up to 20 °C in a single day. Most of the rain falls during winter, meaning it scarcely rains throughout the summer.

Climatic parameters in Albolote
Month	Jan	Feb	Mar	April	May	Jun	Jul	Aug	Sep	Oct	Nov	Dec	Annual
Maximum temperature (°C)	13.0	15.3	18.6	20.1	24.6	30.0	34.4	33.9	29.4	22.7	17.2	13.5	22.7
Average temperature (°C)	6.7	8.5	11.0	12.8	16.8	21.4	24.8	24.5	20.9	15.5	10.7	7.6	15.1
Average minimum temperature (°C)	0.3	1.8	3.4	5.6	9.0	12.9	15.2	15.0	12.4	8.2	4.2	1.8	7.5
Total precipitations (mm)	41	38	30	38	28	17	4	3	16	42	48	53	357
Font: Metereological State Agency of Spain

== Demography ==
According to the Instituto Nacional de Estadística de España, in the year 2014 Albolote had 18,306 inhabitants.

== Politics ==
These are the results for the last elections in Albolote:

Town Hall Albolote 2015			
Politic Group	Votos	%Valid	Charges obtained
Partido Popular (PP)	2.623	29,60%	6
Partido Socialista Obrero Español (PSOE)	2.3363	26,67%	5
Izquierda Unida- Ganemos Albolote para la Gente (PG)	1.530	17,27%	3
Ciudadanos- Partido de la ciudadanía (C's)	1.160	13,09%	2
Agrupación Electoral Ganar Albolote (GA)	709	8%	1

== Communications ==
In Albolote a lot of important roads converge: autovías A-44 that joins Jaen with Granada and its cost-with the A-92, between Almeria and Sevilla. It also stands out the future Segunda circunvalación de Granada (GR-30), that is currently under construction. This road will join Albolote and Alhendin without the need to cross through the center of Granada, with the relief that this will give to the vehicles that come from Ciudad Real and Jaén to the costa mediterránea in Granada.

The principal roads are:

Identificator	Denomination	Itinerary
A-44	Autovía de Sierra Nevada	Bailén – Motril
GR-30	Segunda circunvalación de Granada	Albolote – Alhendín
A-92	Autovía A-92	Sevilla – Almería
N-323a	Carretera de Sierra Nevada	Bailén – Motril
A-4076	'Carretera de Colomera'	Parque del Cubillas -Colomera
GR-3417	De Maracena a Santa Fe por Albolote y Atarfe^{5}	Maracena – Santa Fe
GR-3419	'De A-44 a GR-3424'^{5}	El Chaparral -Güevéjar
GR-3423	De A-44 a Iznalloz^{5}	Deifontes – Iznalloz

== Bus ==
Albolote has a bus service run by Granada's consortium:

Line 122 (Granada-Maracena-Albolote-Atarfe)

Line 123 (Granada-Albolote por Carretera de Jaén)

Line 117 (Granada-Pantano de Cubillas)

METRO:

Since September 2017, Albolote is connected to Granada by the metro.

== Public services ==
=== Healthcare ===
Albolote has a basic zone of healthcare, inside the sanitary district of Granada. The town has a healthcare center in the street Alfonso XIII Nº7, and a medical consultory in the town of Chaparral.

=== Education ===
The town has 13 education centers where there is education for people of all ages:

Generic Denomination	'Name'	'Nature'	'Address'
Education center for adults	S.E.P. "Albolut"	Public	Doctor Burgos Canals, 6
Education center for adults	C.E.P. "Concepción Arenal"	Public	Ctra. de Colomera km. 16,5
Private educational institute	Colegio "Ave María"	Private	Jacobo Camarero, 3
Private pre-school education center	E.I. "Anaki"	Private	Baza, parcela 345. P.I. Juncaril
Private pre-school education center	E.I. "Galopín"	Private	Fray Bartolomé de las Casas, 4
Private pre-school education center	E.I. "Loma Verde"	Private	Av. de las Acacias, s/n. Urbanización Loma Verde
Private pre-school education center	E.I. "Nenes"	Private	Doctor Laureano Vázquez, 4, locales 7 y 8
Primary school	C.E.I.P. "Abadía"	Public	Abadía, 36
Primary school	C.E.I.P. "San Isidro Labrador"	Public	Av. de las Acacias, s/n. El Chaparral
Primary school	C.E.I.P. "Tínar"	Public	Tínar, 46
Pre-school	E.I. "El Parque"	Public	Doctor Burgos Canals, s/n
Pre-school	E.I. "Francisco Lucilo de Carvajal"	Public	Doctor Burgos Canals, 8
Secondary Education institute	I.E.S. "Aricel"	Public	Aricel, s/n

== Culture ==
The popular celebrations are held during the first weekend of August beginning in Thursday. These celebrations are in honor of the saint of the town, the Holly Christ of Health.

== See also ==
- List of municipalities in Granada
