= Churriana de la Vega =

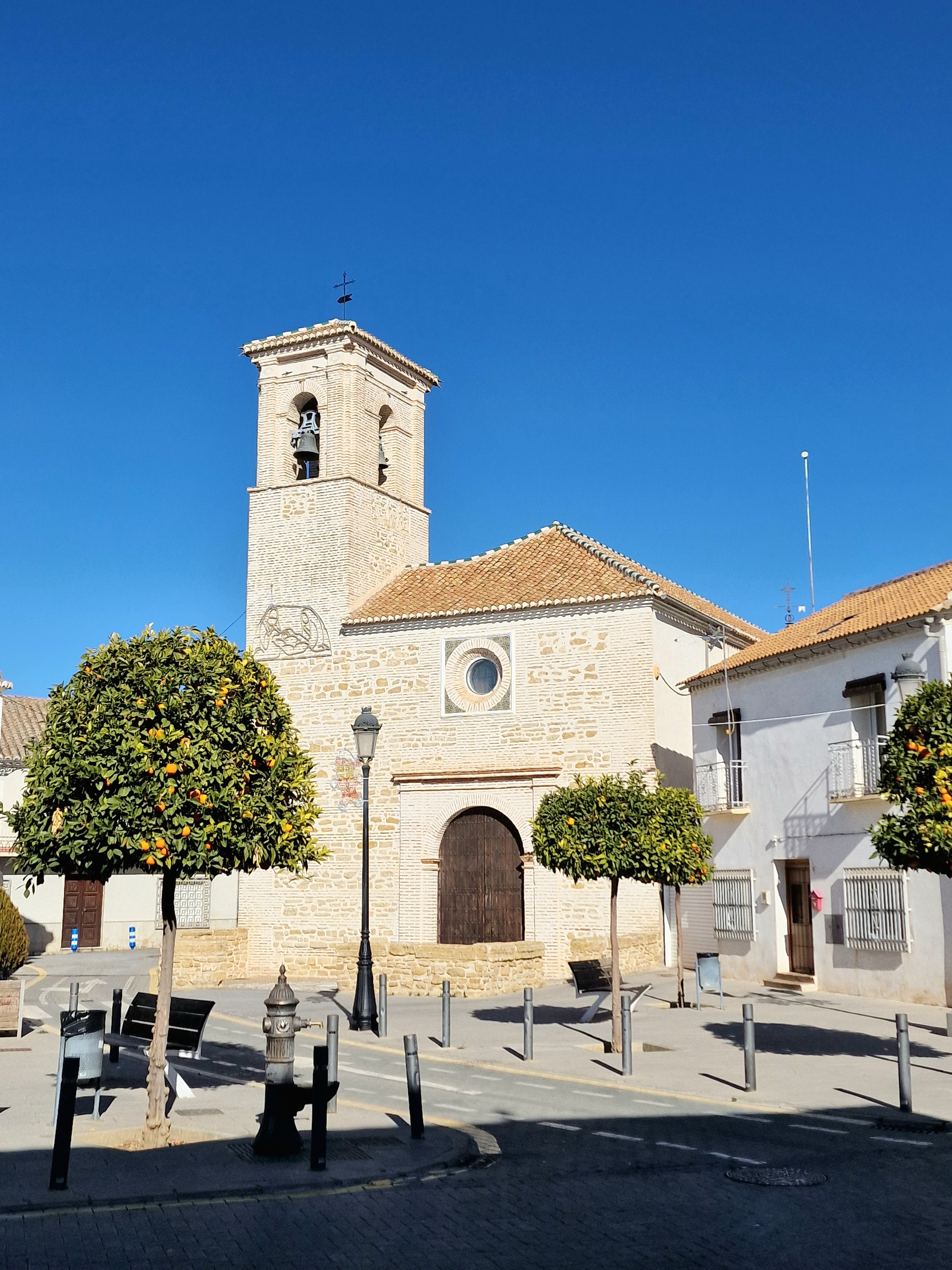

- Coat of arms

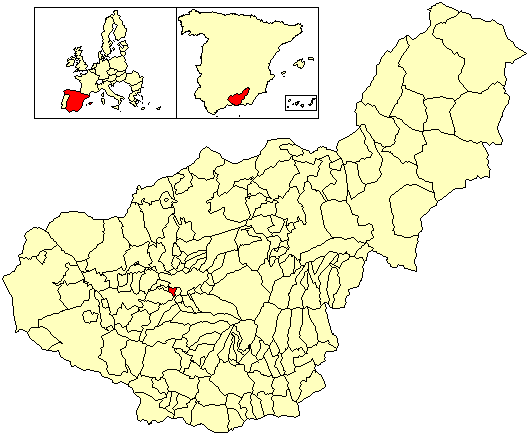
- Location of Churriana de la Vega
- Coordinates: 37°09′N 3°39′W
- Country: Spain
- Province: Granada
- Municipality: Churriana de la Vega

Area
  - Total: 7 km^{2} (2.7 sq mi)
- Elevation: 655 m (2,149 ft)

Population (2025-01-01)
  - Total: 16,878
  - Density: 2,400/km^{2} (6,200/sq mi)
- Time zone: UTC+1 (CET)
  - Summer (DST): UTC+2 (CEST)

Churriana de la Vega is a municipality located in the province of Granada, Spain. According to the 2017 census (INE), the city has a population of 14,556 inhabitants. It sits on the Genil River and is crossed by several smaller streams, providing the farmers around it with water and rich soil.

The first mention of Churriana de la Vega in writing comes from the 14th century Moorish polymath and writer Ibn al-Jatib. It was also the site of some of the negotiations for the final surrender of Granada between the representatives of Boabdil and Isabella I of Castile.

== See also ==
- List of municipalities in Granada
