= Granada campaign (1125–1126) =

Granada campaign (1125–26)
- Part of Reconquista
Date	2 September 1125 – 23 June 1126
Location	Province of Granada
Result	Almoravid victory

Belligerents
Almoravids	Kingdom of Aragon

Commanders and leaders
Ali ibn Yusuf; Abu Tahir Tamim; Abi Bakr	Alfonso the Battler; Gaston of Béarn; Rotrou of Perche

Strength
Unknown	4,000–5,000 knights 15,000 infantry

Casualties and losses
Heavy	Heavy

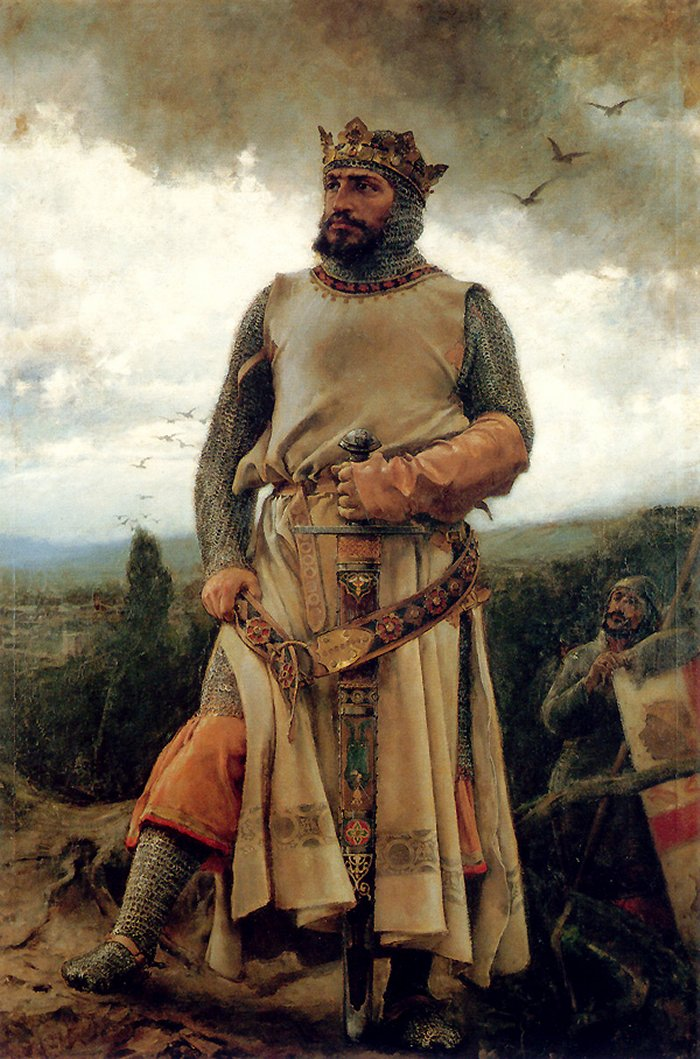
Alfonso I de Aragon by Francisco Pradilla y Ortiz (1879)

In 1125–1126, the Arago-Navarrese king Alfonso the Battler launched a military expedition to capture the city of Granada from the Almoravids. The campaign was carried out over nine months (between September 2, 1125, and June 1126) during which he camped for a long time near Granada, he plundered fields and riches, he defeated the Almoravid army in a pitched battle in Arnisol Anzur, near Puente Genil, south of the current province of Córdoba and rescued a contingent of Mozarabs with which he repopulated the lands of the Ebro Valley recently conquered by the kingdom of Aragon.

The initial objective was to establish a Christian principality in Granada, relying on the Mozarabic population that had insistently requested help from the king of Aragon, as it was subject to the religious fanaticism of the Almoravid period. The Mozarabs of Granada proposed to Alfonso the Battler an internal rebellion against the ruling authority with the support of the Aragonese host; The conjunction was necessary, since Alfonso I, unlike the strategy used in the conquest of Zaragoza in 1118, did not bring assault machinery to Granada, a transport that was in any case extremely impracticable given the long distance that the expedition would travel and the logistical difficulties involved in penetrating so deeply into enemy territory.

Alfonso I's combat morale was high, and the expedition set out in a spirit of great warrior exaltation. Documents from the years 1124 and 1125 referred to the Battler with the terms "reigning in Spain" or "in all the land of Christians and Saracens of Spain", which gives an idea of the triumphalism that was experienced in the environment of the Aragonese king at this time. The contemporary leaders were not having the best of days: Ramón Berenguer III of Barcelona had just been defeated in the battle of Corbins and Urraca of León and Castile, ex-wife of the Aragonese, would die shortly later, on March 8, 1126, without being able to see the end of the civil war that devastated their kingdoms. In this context Alfonso I undertook one of the most daring campaigns of the Reconquista. The raid has gone down in historiography under the name of the "Host of Spain."

== Background ==
With the Aragonese victories, such as the capture of Zaragoza in 1118 and the Battle of Cutanda in 1120, increasing and the weakness of the Almoravid armies showing, news of these victories soon reached the Mozarab populations of Andalusia, encouraging them to revolt against their Muslim rulers and supporting the Christian kingdoms. The Mozarabs of Granada were the wealthiest, most influential, and most populous of all Mozarabs. They began sending messages to the Aragonese to help them, and they promised to provide support and men for Alfonso. Encouraged by his victory at Cutanda, Alfonso agreed to this offer.

The conquests of the large urban centers of the Taifa of Zaragoza by Alfonso I (Zaragoza, Tudela, Daroca, Calatayud) necessitated a significant contingent of new settlers for the medinas, which had to be evicted by the Muslims who inhabited them. Men were also necessary to place in the Aragonese Extremadura and defend the new border, very expanded at that time, as it reached Carrión, Castrojeriz and Burgos, in the northwest; Soria, Berlanga de Duero and Almazán to the west; Sigüenza, Medinaceli, Cella and Gúdar to the south; and Morella and Horta de San Juan to the east.

In 1124 Alfonso I began preparations to undertake a military incursion into Andalusian territory, encouraged by the call of the Mozarabs of Granada, led by Ibn al-Qalas, who requested his support to rebel against the Almoravid governor of the city, Abu Tahir Tamim ibn Yusuf.

He began by securing the passage through the Peña Cadiella gorge (current Benicadell) in the winter of that year, taking the fortress that dominated it with a retinue formed by his most prominent knights, among whom was Rotrou III, Count of Perche, count of Tudela, and Gaston IV, Viscount of Béarn, lord of Zaragoza and main architect of the assault on the capital of the old Zaragoza taifa. Once this fortress was conquered, Alfonso I ensured free passage to the south of Levante, security in the rear and guarantees for the return.

The Arab chronicles indicate that the Mozarabic population of the mountain ranges of Darro and Alpujarras had insistently sent letters to the king of Aragon requesting that he come to Granada, where he would find the support of thousands of Christian men of fighting age; also encouraging him with the story of the agricultural wealth of the Granada plains and the production of precious fabrics, as well as other excellences of that place. From these chronicles it is clear that the initial objective was to unite forces to conquer Granada and establish a Christian principality in its territory, following the example of the lordship that El Cid established in Valencia.

In March 1125 an assembly was held in Uncastillo with the aim of designing the strategy. The square was a possession of Gaston IV, Viscount of Béarn, who, together with Centule II, Count of Bigorre, the magnate Duchy of Aquitaine Auger III of Miramont, viscount of Tursan—who had participated in the taking of Saraqusta in 1118—and the bishops Esteban of Huesca and Pedro Librana from Zaragoza, were present at the meeting. They secured the support of the Selva Major Abbey of Bordeaux, which probably provided financing to the campaign.

Almoravid dynasty

== Campaign ==
=== September 1125-January 1126. Departure of the expedition and arrival in Granada ===
The Battler decided, after this background, to undertake the campaign with an army made up of about four or five thousand knights and a number of around fifteen thousand infantry, although the sources always give exaggerated figures and perhaps they should be reduced to one thousand or one thousand five hundred knights and an indeterminate number of others. In the campaign, Alfonso was accompanied by Gaston of Béarn, Rotrou of Perche, the bishop Esteban of Huesca, the bishop Raymond of Barbastro and the prelate of Zaragoza, Pedro de Librana. Also part of the expedition were Fortún Sánchez as ensign, Judge Pedro Jiménez, and Mr. Ramón Arnaldo from Santa Cruz de Tudela. He left Zaragoza at the beginning of September 1125.

By October 10, the Aragonese army had reached Valencia, where they engaged the Almoravid garrison. During his march, many of the Mozarabics joined the Aragonese. By the end of October, they arrived at Dénia, and another engagement happened where they failed to capture it, a similar result for Baza. They left for Guadix and reached there on November 11th, when Alfonso fought with the Moors for one month to capture it but failed.

It was hard for the Almoravids to combine their forces against Alfonso's march, as he made sure to hide his true destination. The Almoravid governor of Granada, Abu Tahir Tamim, prepared his forces to face the Aragonese raid. He received support from his brother, Ali ibn Yusuf, with enough men.

The host advanced through Daroca, Monreal, Teruel and Segorbe, in the direction of Valencia. and they devastated the crops. Arriving at the coast, Alfonso's army began to attract Mozarabic contingents, who joined him. Through the steps of Játiva and Peña Cadiella, they reached Murcia, Almanzora and Purchena, to stop in Tíjola and camp for eight days.

Resuming the march, the Aragonese army arrived at Baza and, seeing that it was not well defended by fortifications, tried to take it by assault without success, so he resumed the expedition towards Guadix, a city that he attacked on 4 December through one of its cemeteries and then, surrounding through the farmhouse of Graena and that of Alcázar, from the west. He finally settled in Guadix, where he remained for a month and he spent Christmas satisfied with the progress of the expedition and without supply problems. The Almoravids remained passive, without trying to attack the Aragonese monarch. Throughout their advance, groups of Mozarabs had continued to join their forces.

He then decided to send letters to the Christians, thereby revealing his presence less than sixty kilometers from Granada. The governor Abul Tahir did not dare to repress the subsequent Mozarabic insurgency, and the Christian population came to join the Battler's contingent. Abul Tahir, meanwhile, requested reinforcements from the governors of Murcia and Valencia and his brother, the emir Almoravid Ali ibn Yusuf, who sent an important army from Africa.

Alfonso I, then, headed through Diezma to Granada, in whose sight he was on January 7, 1126, with a contingent reinforced by Christians who, according to news from the Andalusian chronicles (which must always be taken with caution), reached fifty thousand men. According to the chronicle of the Norman Orderic Vital, Alfonso's departure was joined in Granada by about ten thousand Mozarabs, who settled in the Ebro valley.

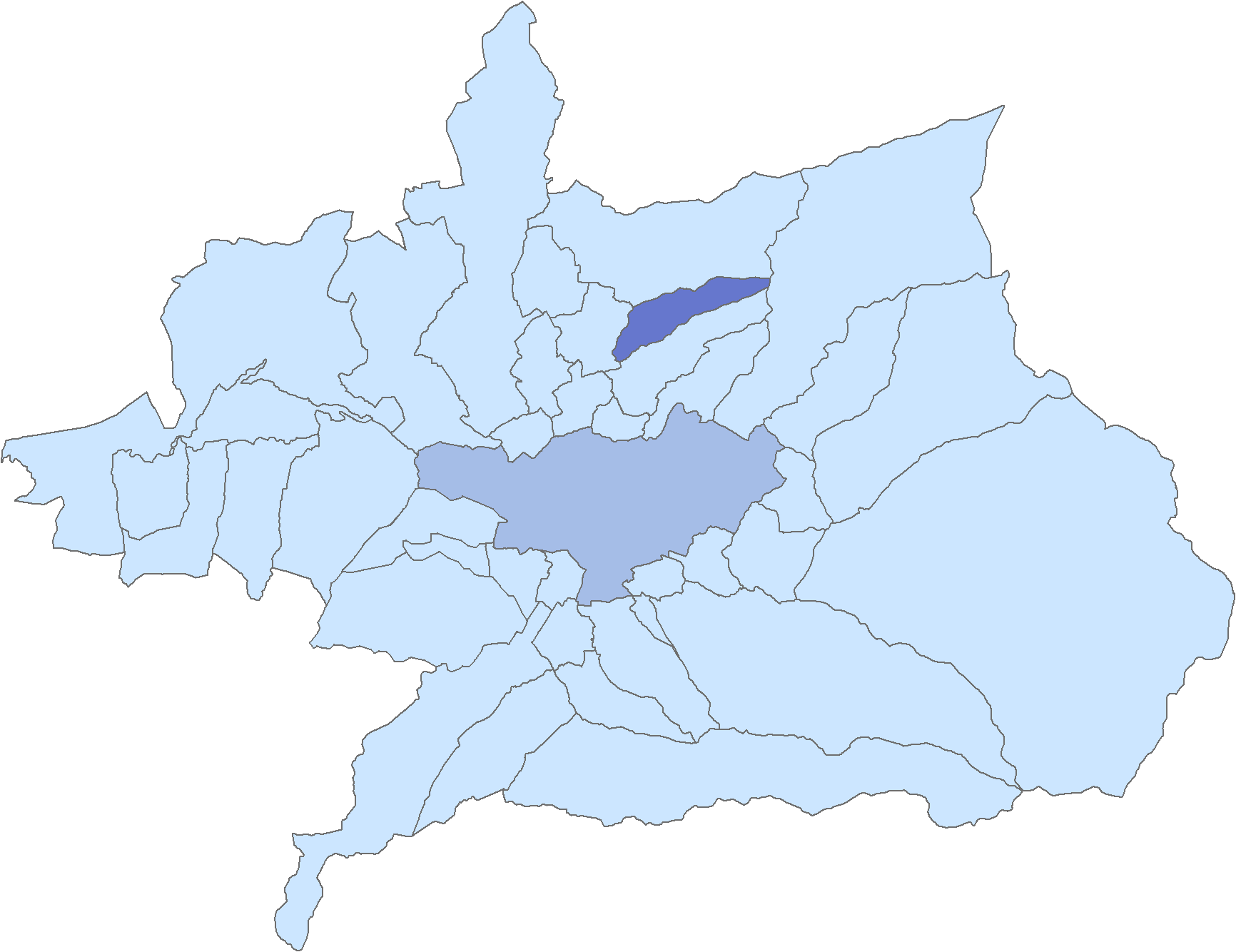
Vega de Granada

=== Operations before the city of Granada ===
Faced with the fear of the Granadans, Alfonso I remained camped in the town of Nívar for more than ten days waiting either to have a pitched battle or for the Mozarabic rebellion to open the doors of Granada. Despite the persistent bad weather and the vigilance of the city's military garrison, it was able to be supplied by the population Christian.

Due to the tense wait, the Battler reproached the person in charge of the Mozarabs of Granada, Ibn al-Qalas, for not complying with the agreement, to which he reproached him for having delayed in skirmishes along the route and having revealed their position in Guadix, which had alerted the Almoravids in time, who were already preparing troops on both sides of the strait; In this way the surprise effect had been nullified and the initial plans had been ruined. The Almoravids had reinforced the defenses and received reinforcements to support themselves in the city, which finally led the Aragonese sovereign to abandon the attempt to take over the square.

Alfonso was forced to retreat on January 21, 1126. Alfonso blamed the Mozarabic leader, Ibn Qalas, for not providing enough aid for the siege.

=== Sacking of the south of Córdoba and victory of Arnisol ===
Realizing the impossibility of entering Granada, Alfonso dedicated himself to ravaging the fields of Vega de Granada and the south of Córdoba, going through Maracena and Pinos Puente to a place called in the chronicles "Assica" (perhaps in the current municipality of Montefrío). and Espejo, and then turn southwest through Cabra and Lucena. Then he headed back towards Córdoba through Aguilar de la Frontera.

While the king of Aragon toured the south of the current province of Córdoba, Abu Bakr, son of the emir Ali ibn Yusuf, (Note: According to Bosch Vilá y Serrano, the leader of these hosts was Abu-l-Tahir Tamim ben Yusuf, brother of the Almoravid emir.) had left with troops from Seville to meet the Battler, and reached him in Arnisol, Arinzol or Aranzuel, according to sources, current Anzur (today municipality of Puente Genil), near Lucena. There a pitched battle was fought on March 10, 1126, with the result of a decisive victory for the Aragonese,while in the Saldaña Castle (Palencia) his ex-wife Urraca I died and was succeeded by Alfonso VII of León.

=== Crossing to the sea: Vélez-Málaga ===
After the victory in the Battle of Arnisol, the Battler headed south through the Alpujarras following the narrow ravines of the course of the Guadalfeo River and reached the coast of Vélez-Málaga by Motril and Salobreña. During the journey, Muslim chronicles say that Alfonso said to one of his trusted lords "What a grave if they threw dirt at us from above!" and they comment that upon reaching the sea, the Aragonese ordered a boat to be launched from which they caught a fish that the king ate, and they wonder in the Andalusian stories if it was to leave an anecdote for the future or to fulfill a promise. It could be a gesture of taking possession of the sea.

=== Arrival of North African Almoravid reinforcements and return of the expedition ===
From Vélez-Málaga, the Christian contingent once again directed its steps towards Granada, camping in the town of Dílar, where it remained three days, and then in Alhendín, repelling several Almoravid attacks. Two days later he arrived at Vega de Granada and settled in La Zubia, six kilometers from the capital, followed closely by the Islamic cavalry in perfect combat formation, which camped at the Atsa fountain and Guadix.

At that time, African reinforcements arrived from Meknes and Fez, led by commanders Abu Hafs ibn Tuzyin and Inalu al-Lamtuni respectively. They harassed Alfonso I, who was forced to retreat towards the north. In Guadix they won in a skirmish with the king of Aragon where one of his main knights died, which gave Inalu al-Lamtumi the government of Granada to the detriment of the ineffective Abul Tahir Tamin ibn Yusuf. The Aragonese militia continued to withdraw through Caravaca de la Cruz (west of Murcia) and Játiva, which was assaulted and taken by the Battler. Alfonso failed to capture the city and decided to leave for home.

The pressure from the North African army was notable, and the return was made in difficult conditions, having to lead a large number of civilians who must have greatly hindered the march, defending themselves of the continuous attacks and forced to abandon many exhausted and sick people due to the duration and hardships of the long campaign carried out. Without rest, the contingent led by Alfonso arrived in Aragon on June 23 1126, decimated by diseases, but satisfied with the achievements achieved (winner in the only full pitched battle) and with the large Mozarabic population rescued.

== Aftermath ==
Alfonso never achieved his objectives during his campaign, despite boasting about defeating the Moors and ravaging their lands. Ten thousand Mozarabs joined with the Aragonese during their return. The Almoravids punished the Mozarabs by deporting them from Andalusia. A Fatwa by Ibn Rushd al-Jadd ordered the deportation of Mozarabs to the Maghreb. A sizable number were deported, but this ruling was not general, as many Mozarabs stayed in other places such as Córdoba and Granada.

== Sources ==
- Bosch Vilá, Jacinto; Molina López, Emilio (1998). Los Almorávides (in Spanish). University of Granada. ISBN 9788433824516.
- Muhammad Abdullah Enan, The State of Islam in Andalusia, Vol. III: The Era of Almoravids and Almohads, Part 1.
- Lacarra and Miguel (1978). "Expedition to Andalusia". Alfonso the Battler (in Spanish). Guara. pp. 83–92. ISBN 84-85303-05-9.
- Lema Pueyo, José Ángel (2008). Alfonso I el Batallador, rey de Aragón y Pamplona (1104-1134) (in Spanish). Gijón: Trea. pp. 189–213. ISBN 978-84-9704-399-1.
- Bernard F. Reilly, The Contest of Christian and Muslim Spain 1031 - 1157.
- Jacek Maciejewski, John Ott, and Radosław Kotecki, Between Sword and Prayer, Warfare and Medieval Clergy in Cultural Perspective.
- Serrano, Delfina (1991). "Dos fetuas sobre la expulsión de mozárabes al Magreb en 1126" (PDF). Anaquel de Estudios Árabes (in Spanish). 2. Universidad Complutense de Madrid: 163–182. ISSN 1988-2645. Archived from the original (PDF) on 2010-03-30.
- Ubieto Arteta, Antonio (1981). "La expedición por Andalucía (1125-1126)". Historia de Aragón (in Spanish). Vol. 1. La formación territorial. Zaragoza: Anubar. pp. 172–179. ISBN 84-7013-181-8.
