= Battle of Arnisol =

1126 battle during the Reconquista

- Part of Granada campaign (1125–1126)
Date	10 March 1126
Location	Near Puente Genil, Almoravid Empire (present-day Spain) 37°23′0″N 4°46′0″W
Result	Aragonese victory

Belligerents
Kingdom of Aragon	Almoravid Empire

Commanders and leaders
Alfonso I of Aragon	Ibn Abu Bakr

Strength
Unknown	Unknown

Casualties and losses
Unknown	High

The Battle of Arnisol, Arinzol or Aranzuel took place on 10 March 1126 near the Anzur Castle between Aragonese forces led by Alfonso the Battler and Almoravid forces led by Ibn Abu Bakr. It was part of the Granada campaign.

== Background ==
In 1118, a council held in Toulouse offered the benefits of a crusade to those who came to the aid of the Kingdom of Aragon in the conquest of the city of Zaragoza, the capital city of the Taifa of Zaragoza. The city was taken by Alfonso I of Aragon on 18 December 1118, causing the Ebro valley to collapse, with the Aragonese taking Tudela in February 1119 and conquering Calatayud in 1120.

In 1125, Alfonso I of Aragon began a campaign against the lands of Granada, attacking Algeciras, Suquar and Dénia without success; advancing towards Xàtiva, then Murcia, and as far as Vera and Almanzora, to retreat at Purchena; and then towards Baza, which he attacked again without result. He attacked Guadix, which he could not conquer, and continued southwards, reaching the sea at Almería. He planned, on his return to Aragon, to attack Granada, but bad weather and the presence of Almoravids made him give up. He raised camp on 22 January, passing through Maracena, Pinos Puente, Laseca (near Alcalá la Real), Luque, Baena, Écija, Cabra and Aguilar de la Frontera.

== Battle ==
In the early morning of 10 March, the Almoravids of Córdoba led by Ibn Abu Bakr, son of the Almoravid emir, attacked the Aragonese camp. Although they managed to capture many tents, Alfonso I of Aragon quickly wore his armor and managed to organize his army well. Due to the fact that the Almoravids were fighting scattered across the camp, the Aragonese were victorious, driving the Muslim army out of their camp.

== Aftermath ==
After the battle, Alfonso passed through the Alpujarras, crossed the rivers Salobreña and Guadalfeo and arrived at Vélez-Málaga, where he turned again towards Granada, passing through Dílar and Alhendín, where he found Muslim contingents, whom he confronted and put to flight. He then entered the Vega de Granada, crossed the Sierra Nevada, and passed through Alicún, Guadix, Murcia, Xàtiva and Alcolea de Cinca, before returning to Aragon.

The results of the campaign were the enlistment of many Andalusian and Valencian Mozarabs, rather than territorial conquests. These Mozarabs repopulated the conquered lands of the Ebro and Jalón, while the Mozarabs who remained in al-Andalus were almost all deported or exterminated.

== Bibliography ==
- O'Callaghan, Joseph F. (2013-09-10). Reconquest and Crusade in Medieval Spain. University of Pennsylvania Press. ISBN 978-0-8122-0306-6.
- Setton, Kenneth Meyer; Hazard, Harry W. (1975). The Fourteenth and Fifteenth Centuries. Univ of Wisconsin Press. ISBN 978-0-299-06670-3.
- Andrés, Roberto Blanco; Clavero, Mariano González (2023). Historia de España BCH2 - Novedad 2023 (in Spanish). Editex. ISBN 978-84-1134-548-4.
- Roth, Norman (2024-04-02). Jews, Visigoths and Muslims in Medieval Spain: Cooperation and Conflict. BRILL. ISBN 978-90-04-62424-5.
- Reilly, Bernard F. (1996-01-09). The Contest of Christian and Muslim Spain 1031 - 1157. John Wiley & Sons. ISBN 978-0-631-19964-9.
- Lacarra, José María (1978). Alfonso el Batallador. Zaragoza: Guara Editorial. ISBN 84-85303-05-9.
- Solana, Darío Español (2024-04-24). Yihad y Reconquista: Guerra en Aragón, Navarra y Cataluña, siglos XI-XII (in Spanish). Desperta Ferro Ediciones. ISBN 978-84-128068-4-7.
- Ibrahim, Raymond (2022-07-26). Defenders of the West: The Christian Heroes Who Stood Against Islam. Simon and Schuster. ISBN 978-1-64293-821-0.

=== Further reading ===
- Huici Miranda, Ambrosio. Las grandes batallas de la reconquista durante las invasiones africanas. Granada, Editorial Universidad de Granada, 2000. ISBN 84-338-2659-X
- Lacarra y De Miguel, José María, «Expedición a Andalucía», Alfonso el Batallador, Zaragoza, Guara, 1978, págs. 83-92. ISBN 84-85303-05-9.
- Lema Pueyo, José Ángel (2008). Alfonso I el Batallador, rey de Aragón y Pamplona (1104-1134). Gijón: Trea. pp. 189–213. ISBN 978-84-9704-399-1.
- Ubieto Arteta, Antonio, «La expedición por Andalucía (1125-1126)», Historia de Aragón, vol. 1. La formación territorial, Zaragoza, Anubar ediciones, 1981, págs. 172-179. ISBN 84-7013-181-8.
