= Cabra =

Cabra may refer to:

== Ireland ==
- Cabra, Dublin, a district in north Dublin, Ireland
- Cabra, County Down, a townland in County Down, Northern Ireland
- Cabragh, Fertiana, County Tipperary, a townland in County Tipperary, Ireland
- Cabra Castle, a castle in County Cavan

== Spain ==
- Cabra, Spain, a municipality in the province of Córdoba, Andalucía, Spain
- Cabra (river), a river in northern Spain
- Cabra de Mora, a municipality in the province of Teruel, Aragón, Spain
- Battle of Cabra, a battle fought by El Cid

== Australia ==
- Cabramatta, New South Wales, a suburb of Sydney
- Cabra Dominican College, a school in Adelaide, South Australia

== Philippines ==
- Cabra Island, an island in the Lubang, Occidental Mindoro province

== People ==
- Eduardo Cabra (born 1979), Puerto Rican musician, composer and music producer
