= Siege of Calatayud =

1118 siege of Calatayud by Alfonso I of Aragon

- Part of the Reconquista
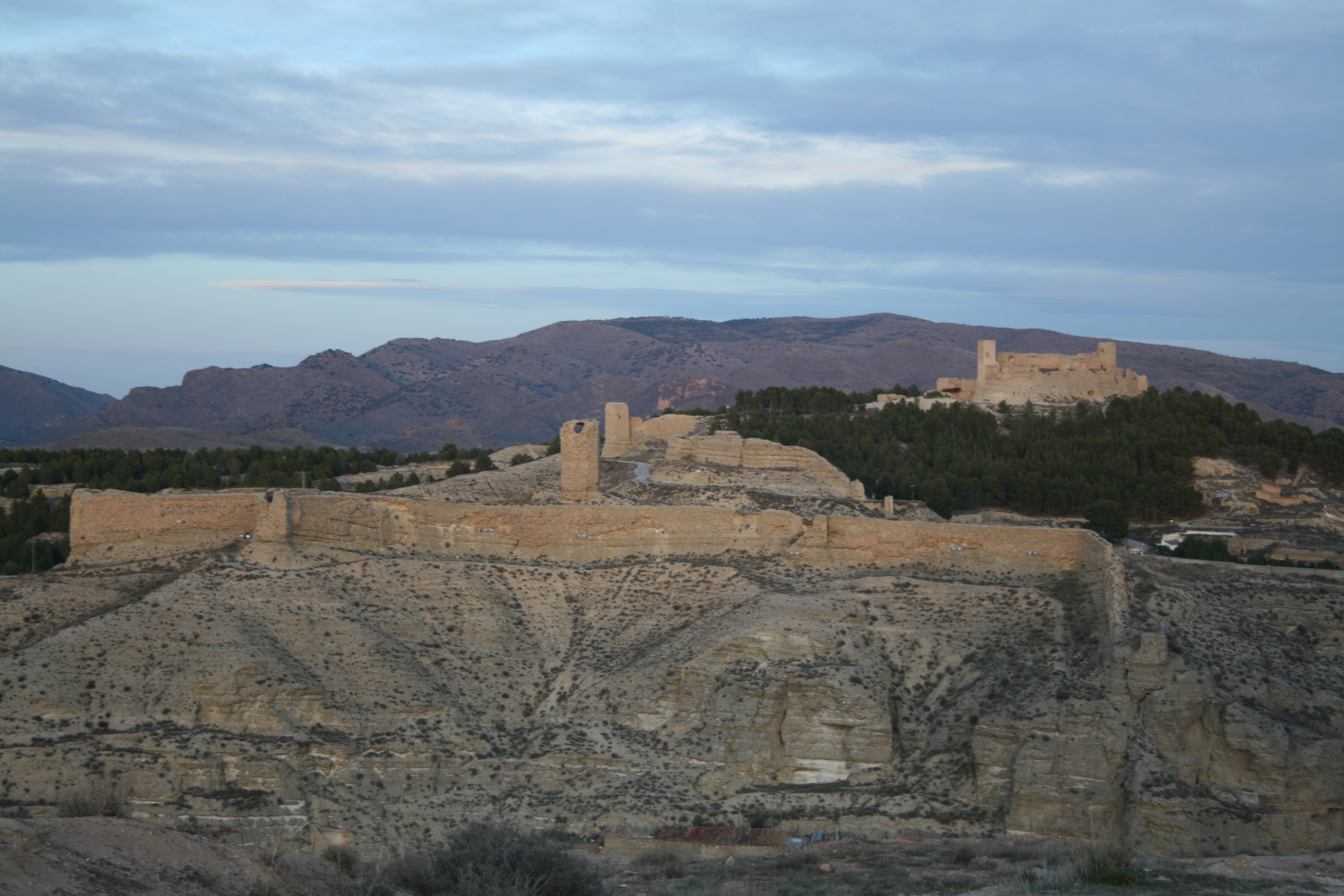
- The castle of Ayyub, in Calatayud
Date	May – 24 June 1120
Location	Calatayud, Taifa of Zaragoza 41°21′0″N 1°38′0″W
Result	Aragonese victory

Belligerents
Kingdom of Aragon; Duchy of Aquitaine	Almoravid Empire

Commanders and leaders
Alfonso I the Battler; William IX of Aquitaine	Unknown

Strength
Unknown	Unknown

Casualties and losses
Unknown	Unknown

The Siege of Calatayud occurred in 1120 when Alfonso the Battler in conjunction with William IX of Aquitaine successfully besieged and captured the Amoravid city of Calatayud in the former Taifa of Zaragoza.

== Background ==
In 1118, Alfonso accompanied by Gaston IV of Béarn and Centule II of Bigorre, began a campaign with the objective of conquering the city of Zaragoza. The city fell on 18 December, after an 8 month siege. In 1119, shortly after this victory, Alfonso conquered Tudela and Tarazona. Following those conquests, Alfonso then encouraged Christian settlers to move into the territory near the city of Soria to secure the Ebro Valley and the surrounding highlands against the Almoravids. At the beginning of 1120, Alfonso began to prepare for the conquest of Calatayud, the second largest city of the former Taifa of Zaragoza.

== Siege ==
Alfonso arrived at Calatayud with the Duke of Aquitaine in May 1120. With the possibility of a battle looming, some Aragonese knights began to make their testaments, including Lope Garcés, who donated his assets to the Holy Sepulchre and the Knights Hospitaller.

At the beginning of June, after Alfonso received the news that an Almoravid army was heading to relieve the siege, he decided to confront the Muslim force in the field. He left a small detachment at Calatayud to continue the siege of the city and departed with the preponderance of his army. On 17 June 1120, Alfonso and the Duke of Aquitaine defeated the Almoravid relief force at the Battle of Cutanda. With no further hope of reinforcements, Calatayud surrendered along with Daroca, another Almoravid Zaragozan city under siege by the Christians.

== Aftermath ==
Calatayud surrendered without resistance from the local Muslims. After the capture of the city, Alfonso appointed Jimeno Sanz as lord of the city. Two years later he was replaced by Íñigo Jiménez. Alfonso also granted the city a charter, which he ratified and extended in December 1131.

In 1122, Alfonso captured Borja.. Two years later he captured Medinaceli. During the next two years, Alfonso launched a campaign against Granada and Valencia where he successfully encouraged many Mozarabs to repopulate cities conquered by him previously, including Calatayud despite not obtaining territorial changes,

== Legacy ==
Each year on the weekend closest to 24 June, the inhabitants of Calatayud celebrate a festival called Las Alfonsadas, which commemorates the capture of the city by the Aragonese forces.
