= Fāṭima bint Abī ʿAlī al-Ṣadafī =

Fāṭima bint Abī ʿAlī al-Ṣadafī (1114/5–1193) was a learned woman of al-Andalus.

Fāṭima, who in some sources is called Khadīja, was born in Murcia in 1114 or 1115. She was the daughter of the scholar Abū ʿAlī al-Ṣadafī and his wife, a daughter of Mūsā ibn Saʿāda. She was a child when her father died in the battle of Cutanda in 1120. She became known for her piety, asceticism, calligraphy, bibliophily and ability to recite the Qurʾān and ḥadīth.

Fāṭima married a disciple of her father's, Abū Muḥammad ʿAbd Allāh ibn Mūsā ibn Burṭuluh, who had returned to al-Andalus from performing the Ḥajj. One of their children, ʿAbd al-Raḥmān, became the qāḍī (judge) of Dénia. Fāṭima died at over eighty years of age (per the Islamic calendar).
