= Fernando Priego =

Spanish politician (born 1981)

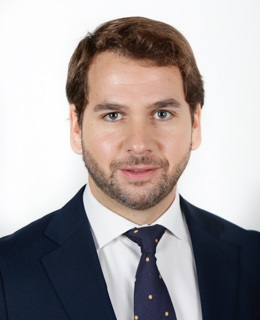
- Priego in 2019

Member of the Senate
- Incumbent
- Assumed office 19 July 2016
- Constituency: Córdoba

Personal details
- Born: 29 October 1981 (age 44)
- Party: People's Party

Fernando Priego Chacón (born 29 October 1981) is a Spanish politician serving as a member of the Senate since 2016. He has served as mayor of Cabra since 2011.
