= Abū ʿAlī al-Ṣadafī =

Abū ʿAlī Ḥusayn ibn Muḥammad ibn Fīrruh ibn Muḥammad ibn Ḥayyūn ibn Sukkara al-Ṣadafī al-Saraqusṭī (c. 1062 – June/July 1120), usually known as Abū ʿAlī al-Ṣadafī or Ibn Sukkara, was a Muslim scholar from al-Andalus (Spain).

A native of Zaragoza, al-Ṣadafī was educated in Zaragoza, Valencia and Almería before setting out in 1088 on a riḥla fī ṭalab al-ʿilm ('journey in search of knowledge') and a Ḥajj (pilgrimage). He visited Mahdia, Cairo, Mecca, Baṣra, Anbār, Wāsiṭ, Damascus, Alexandria and Tinnīs. He stayed for five years in Baghdād. He returned to al-Andalus in 1096 and settled in Murcia.

Al-Ṣadafī was a renowned expert in qirāʾāt (Qurʾānic readings) and ḥadīth (Islamic traditions). He married a daughter of Abū ʿImrān Mūsā ibn Saʿāda and his library passed to his inlaws on his death. He had only one daughter, Fāṭima. In 1111, he was acclaimed as qāḍī (judge) of Murcia by its populace. After exposing the injustice and inefficiency of the Almoravid system, he tendered his resignation in a letter addressed to the Emir ʿAlī ibn Yūsuf, which is preserved. His resignation was initially declined before being accepted. He lievd in Játiva for a time before volunteering for the army. He died at the battle of Cutanda in 1120 and was reckoned a martyr by his disciples and biographers. The date of the battle is given variously as 17 or 24 June or 16 July.

Al-Ṣadafī wrote only a few works and none have survived to this day. Five works are attributed to him. Four of these concern ḥadīth and may have been little more than compilations of traditions. His most cited work is Subāʿiyyāt. He wrote one legal work, a commentary on the Shāfiʿī jurisprudence of al-Qaffāl al-Shāshī.

== Bibliography ==
- De la Puente, Cristina (1998). "Vivre et mourir pour Dieu, œuvre et héritage d'Abū ʿAlī Al-Ṣadafī (m. 514/1120)". Studia Islamica (88): 77–102. JSTOR 1595698.
- De la Puente, Cristina (2018). "Al-Sadafi". Diccionario Biográfico Español. Real Academia de la Historia.
- El Hour, Rachid (2000). "The Andalusian Qāḍī in the Almoravid Period: Political and Judicial Authority". Studia Islamica (90): 67–83. JSTOR 1596165.
- Fierro, Maribel (1995). "al-Ṣadafī". In Bosworth, C. E.; van Donzel, E.; Heinrichs, W. P. & Lecomte, G. (eds.). The Encyclopaedia of Islam, Second Edition. Volume VIII: Ned–Sam. Leiden: E. J. Brill. pp. 707–708. doi:10.1163/1573-3912_islam_SIM_6408. ISBN 978-90-04-09834-3.
