= Wall of Daroca =

Defensive fortification in Spain

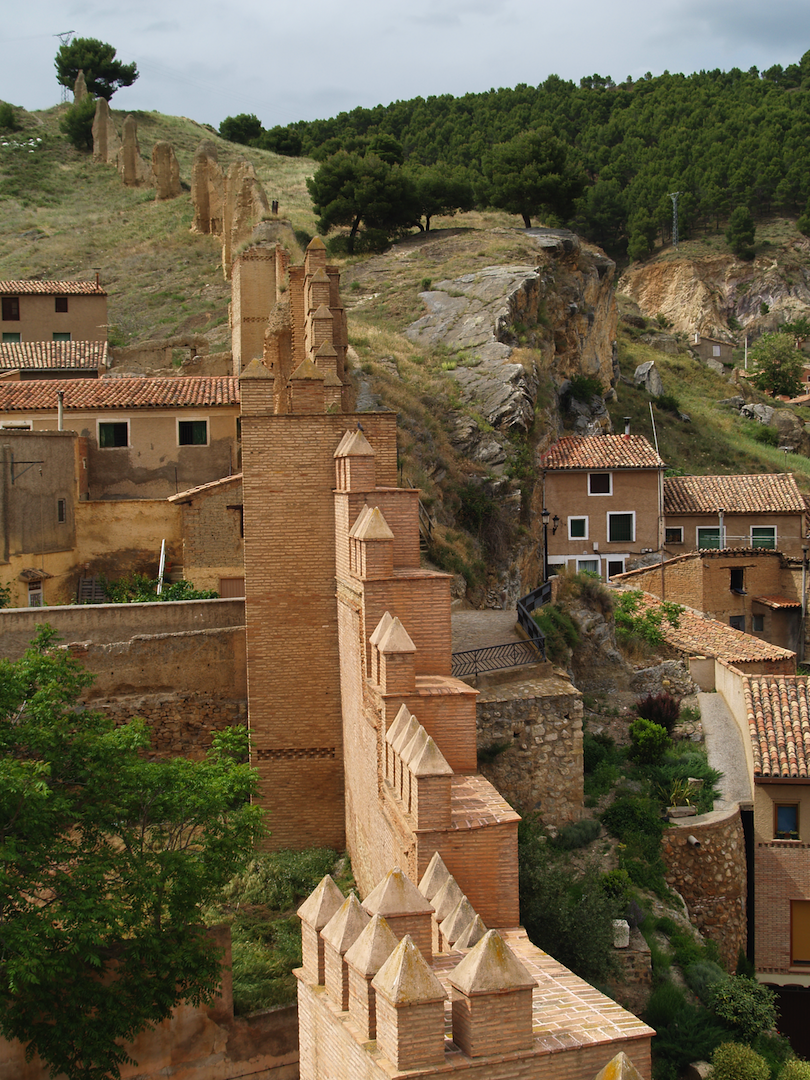
- Walls from the Puerta Baja segment
- Interactive map of the Wall of Daroca area

General information
- Architectural style: Moorish, Mudéjar, Romanesque
- Year built: 1000s—1400s

The Wall of Daroca (Spanish: Muralla de Daroca) is a fortification located in Daroca in the Spanish Province of Zaragoza. First built as a Muslim fortification in the 11th or 12th centuries, the wall expanded with Daroca under Christian rule as the city itself expanded. The original wall had segments broken up by the Castillo Mayor (English: Bigger castle). It has around 4 kilometers of walls with several gates and major tower and 114 towers.

The wall was used defensively during multiple wars, including the War of the Two Peters, Peninsular War, and the Carlist Wars, in which the city was captured several times.

The wall is made of bricks held together with red-gray mortar. It uses dimension stones and ashlar for the towers. The wall is also supported by buttresses.

City officials have said that 64% of the wall is estimated to be in poor condition, and parts of it have collapsed. There have been at least 3 such incidents in the years leading up to 2022, with the greatest damage being in the old Castillo Mayor section.

== Segments ==
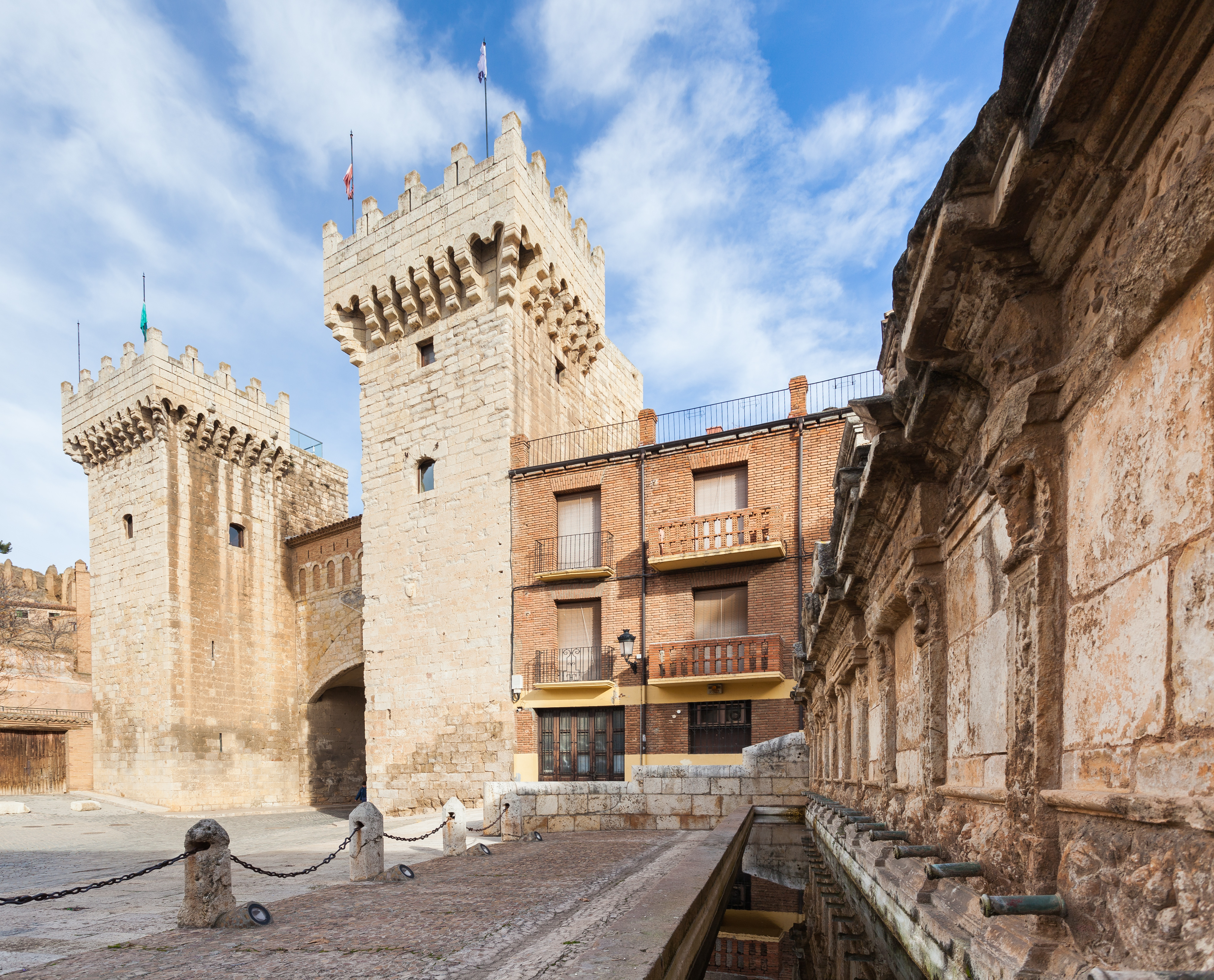
Puerta Baja

Major segments of the wall include:

- Castillo Mayor, the original part
- Puerta Baja, which has two grand towers
- Puerta Alta
- Puerta del Arrabal/Puerta de San Martín de la Parra, which is built in a Mudéjar style
- Portal de Valencia, which has a sunroom on top
- Muro de los Tres Guitarros/Torre de San Valero, a tower with windows reminiscent of a guitar
- Torre del Aguila, built in the War of the Two Peters, has since crumbled
- Torreón de San Cristobal, one of the three main towers
- Cerro de San Jorge, built mostly in the 15th century, and a main tower
