= Almanzora =

Almanzora is a small city in the province of Almería, Andalusia, Spain. Its name, derives from the Arabic al-Mansura (المنصورة), "place of victory", and has been passed on from the city to which is shared with a river and to the surrounding Comarca of Almanzora.

The area has been settled at least since Roman times. In 1436, during the Reconquista, an expedition of Murcians conquered the city from Muslim rule. In 1753, the town was the administrative center of the Comarca of Almanzora, and in the 19th century Antonio Abellán y Peñuela was made Marquis of Almanzora.

As in many rural areas of Andalusia, there was much emigration during the 20th century. Since roughly the 1990s, there has been an influx of people from the United Kingdom who have come for the sunny Almerían climate, as well as some return of earlier migrants.

The economy has traditionally been mainly agricultural, especially citrus fruits, with lemons as an important export crop. The area is also noted for its artisanal breads. Recent immigration from the UK has caused something of a construction boom. There is also a rise in rural tourism (farm stays, etc.)

== Places of interest ==
- Palace of Almanzora, dating from the time of the marquisate. A neoclassical building designed by Ventura Rodríguez, declared part of the Patrimonio Histórico Andaluz.
- El Púlpito windmill, a flour mill disused since the 19th century, used from milling wheat grown near the banks of the Almanzora River. The building was originally a military watchtower, one of a series in the river valley, dating back to the Muslim-ruled Kingdom of Granada, intended to defend against the invaders of the Reconquista.
- Albox-Almanzora railway station. The best-preserved of the stations of the former Guadix-Almendricos rail line, closed in 1985. The station chief continued to live there until around the year 2000. It was then used as a band rehearsal space, and later was renovated and converted into a lounge for seniors, with a bar, the "Café-bar La Estación".
- Mirador de la Cerrá, a viewpoint constructed by local youths.
- Rail bridge over the Rambla de Albox, a tributary to the Almanzora River
- Las Minas, iron mines closed in the mid-20th century.
- La Cimbra, a remnant of an old irrigation system. An artificial spring near El Púlpito waters the only elm forests in the area. Such structures were more common in centuries past, with irrigation by similar techniques dating back even before Roman times.
