= Battle of Cabra =

Battle in 1079 in Spain

- Part of the Reconquista
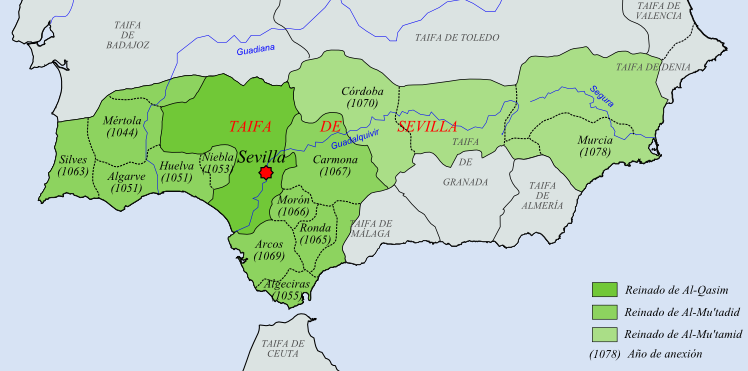
- Map of the Taifa of Seville.
Date	1079
Location	Cabra, Province of Córdoba, Spain 37°28′00″N 4°26′00″W
Result	Victory for Taifa of Sevilla

Belligerents
Taifa of Seville	Taifa of Granada

Commanders and leaders
Al-Mu'tamid ibn Abbad; Rodrigo Díaz de Vivar "El Cid"	Abdallah ibn Buluggin; García Ordóñez (POW); Diego Pérez (POW); Lope Sánchez (POW); Fortuño Sánchez
- Location within Province of Córdoba (Spain) Battle of Cabra (Spain)

The Battle of Cabra took place in 1079 in southern Iberia (now Spain) between two Islamic states, Granada and Seville. Each side was aided by Castilian knights under Alfonso VI. It resulted in a victory for El Cid (Rodrigo Díaz), who routed the invading forces of Emir Abd Allah of Granada and his Christian allies led by Count García Ordóñez. El Cid captured Ordóñez and other Christian knights and held them for three days until releasing them to return to Castile.
