= Aguilar de la Frontera =

- Municipality
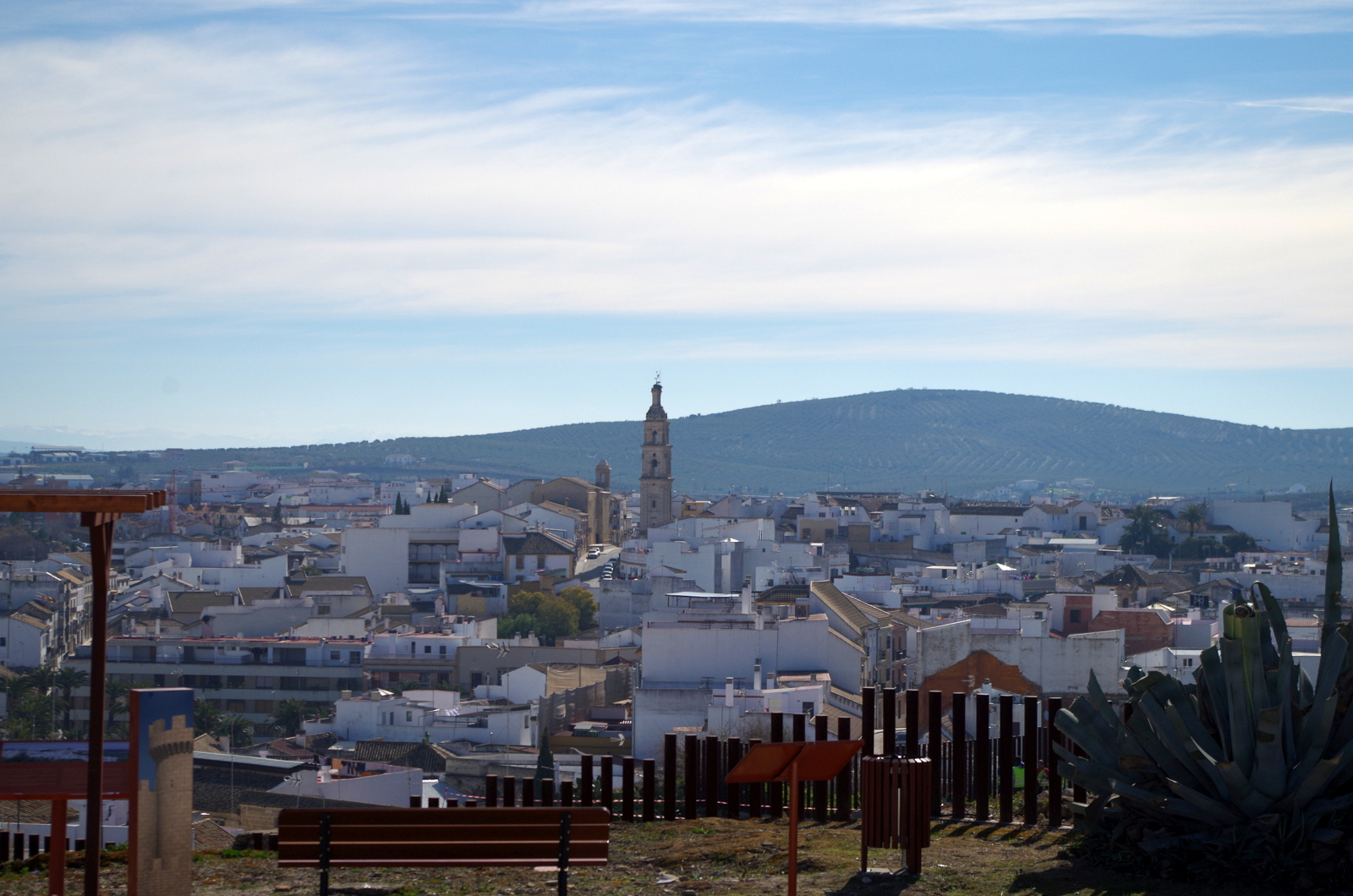

- Flag Coat of arms

- Location within Andalusia Location within Spain
- Coordinates: 37°24′50″N 4°29′18″W
- Country: Spain
- Autonomous community: Andalusia
- Province: Córdoba

Area
  - Total: 166.48 km^{2} (64.28 sq mi)
- Elevation: 379 m (1,243 ft)

Population (2025-01-01)
  - Total: 13,130
  - Density: 78.87/km^{2} (204.3/sq mi)
- Time zone: UTC+1 (CET)
  - Summer (DST): UTC+2 (CEST)
- Postal code: 14920

Aguilar de la Frontera is a Spanish municipality and town in the province of Córdoba, Andalusia.

Aguilar is located near the river Cabra, in the hilly natural region of the Campiña de Córdoba in between the Guadalquivir and the fringes of the Subbaetic ranges. It lies on the route (A-45) connecting Córdoba and Málaga.

As Ancient Ipagro, it was the seat of a bishopric. Known as Bulay in the Islamic period and possessing a fortress (ḥiṣn) since the 9th century, the place changed its name to Aguilar after capitulating and passing to Christian control in 1240, soon becoming the head of the first nobiliary lordship in Andalusia (thus in the Kingdom of Córdoba), as it was gifted by the monarch in 1257. During the late middle ages, it thrived as the head of the House of Aguilar, under the Fernández de Córdoba. The town's 19th-century octagonal plaza stands out as an instance of neoclassical urbanism.

Demographics are stagnant and, similarly to other municipalities in the area, population does not exceed the one it had in the 1960s.

== History ==
First traces of human presence in the area date to the middle Palaeolithic Age. The Romans captured it from the Iberians during the time of the Roman Republic and named it Ipagro, which took part in the civil war between Julius Caesar and Pompey, and flourished in the early Imperial Age. After the fall of the Western Roman Empire, it was ruled by the Visigoths and, from the 8th century, by the Muslim emirate of Córdoba, with the name of Bulay (also Pulay).

In the 9th century it became the headquarters of the rebel Umar ibn Hafsun, who built extensive fortifications and reinforced the castle. However, in 891, Umar ibn Hafsun lost the town to emir Abdallah ibn Muhammad of Córdoba. Due to its strategic position, it was contested and, after the dissolution of the caliphate of Córdoba, it became part of the cora of Cabra. In 1240 it was conquered by the Christians, although numerous Muslims were allowed to remain. King Peter I of Castile assigned its seigniory to Alfonso Fernandez Coronel, but later reannexed it to the crown. The town was renamed Aguilar of the Frontier due to its position on the border with the Moorish Kingdom of Granada.

In 1370, due to the loyalty shown in the civil war, King Henry II of Castile gave Aguilar to Gonzalo Fernandez de Cordoba, first of a dynasty who held the town until the abolition of feudalism in the 19th century. The town grew until the 1570s-1580s, after which it decayed, also due to several plague outbreaks which decimated the population, and to the shrinking level of the agriculture.

During the Spanish Civil War Aguilar sided with the Nationalist faction. Many of its citizens fell fighting for the nationalist cause. A cross erected in their honour was demolished in 2021 by the town hall, causing international outrage.

== Climate ==
Aguilar de la Frontera has a hot summer mediterranean climate (Köppen: Csa) with very hot, dry summers and mild, wet winters. Located in the Guadalquivir Valley, it experiences one of the hottest summers in Spain, with mean maximums exceeding 36 °C (97 °F) and temperatures above 40 °C (104 °F) are common. Precipitation is moderate, with spring being the wettest season.

Climate data for Aguilar de la Frontera (2005-2025), extremes (2005-present)
Month	Jan	Feb	Mar	Apr	May	Jun	Jul	Aug	Sep	Oct	Nov	Dec	Year
Record high °C (°F)	24.6 (76.3)	25.9 (78.6)	29.9 (85.8)	36.8 (98.2)	38.4 (101.1)	41.7 (107.1)	46.1 (115.0)	46.5 (115.7)	43.6 (110.5)	36.7 (98.1)	28.8 (83.8)	24.4 (75.9)	46.5 (115.7)
Mean daily maximum °C (°F)	14.4 (57.9)	16.0 (60.8)	18.7 (65.7)	21.9 (71.4)	26.9 (80.4)	32.1 (89.8)	36.3 (97.3)	36.3 (97.3)	30.6 (87.1)	25.7 (78.3)	18.2 (64.8)	15.5 (59.9)	24.4 (75.9)
Daily mean °C (°F)	9.2 (48.6)	10.5 (50.9)	12.8 (55.0)	15.8 (60.4)	19.7 (67.5)	24.2 (75.6)	27.5 (81.5)	27.8 (82.0)	23.5 (74.3)	19.5 (67.1)	13.1 (55.6)	10.4 (50.7)	17.8 (64.1)
Mean daily minimum °C (°F)	4.0 (39.2)	5.0 (41.0)	7.0 (44.6)	9.7 (49.5)	12.6 (54.7)	16.2 (61.2)	18.7 (65.7)	19.3 (66.7)	16.4 (61.5)	13.2 (55.8)	7.9 (46.2)	5.3 (41.5)	11.3 (52.3)
Record low °C (°F)	−8.4 (16.9)	−5.6 (21.9)	−2.8 (27.0)	2.7 (36.9)	4.4 (39.9)	9.0 (48.2)	12.3 (54.1)	12.2 (54.0)	8.2 (46.8)	2.5 (36.5)	−1.8 (28.8)	−3.3 (26.1)	−8.4 (16.9)
Average rainfall mm (inches)	46.8 (1.84)	50.1 (1.97)	77.5 (3.05)	57.4 (2.26)	29.6 (1.17)	6.3 (0.25)	0.5 (0.02)	18.2 (0.72)	20.7 (0.81)	65.3 (2.57)	68.2 (2.69)	60.8 (2.39)	501.4 (19.74)
Source: Agencia Estatal de Meteorologia (AEMET OpenData)

== Ecclesiastical history ==
Ipagro once was a suffragan bishopric of the Metropolitan Archdiocese of Sevilla, survived the 8th century of advent of Islam but was suppressed.

Only two bishops are historically documented :

- Simagine, mentioned at the council of Elvira
- Recafredo, mentioned in 839.

=== Titular see ===
The diocese was nominally restored in 1969 as Latin Titular bishopric of Ipagro (Latin = Curiate Italian) / Epagren(sis) (Latin adjective).

It has had the following incumbents, so far of the fitting Episcopal (lowest) rank:

- Malcolm A. MacEachern (1970.02.24 – 1970.11.23) on emeritate as former Bishop of Charlottetown (Canada) (1954.11.27 – 1970.02.24); died 1982
- James Patrick Mahoney (1972.07.25 – death 2002.06.01) as Auxiliary Bishop of Archdiocese of New York (NY, USA) (1972.07.25 – 1997.05.10) and on emeritate
- Eduardo Horacio García (2003.06.21 – 2014.11.06) as Auxiliary Bishop of Archdiocese of Buenos Aires (Argentina) (2003.06.21 – 2014.11.06); next

Bishop of San Justo (Argentina) (2014.11.06 – ...)

- Luis Javier Argüello Garcia (2016.04.14 – ...), Auxiliary Bishop of Archdiocese of Valladolid (Spain).

== Main sights ==
- Castillo de Aguilar, a castle known from at least the 9th century. It is mostly in ruin, a part turned into a cistern for the local aqueduct.
- Casas seňoriales ("Noble mansions"), including those of the Moralejo, Arrabal and Carrera (16th-17th centuries).
- Torre del Reloj (Clock Tower), in Baroque style, built in 1770-74
- Plaza de San José, a polygonal square from 1806 with the Ayuntamiento (Town Hall).
- Parish Church of Nuestra Señora del Soterraño, founded in 1260 and remade in 1530
- Church of Cristo de la Salud (17th century)
- Church of the Candelaria (16th century)
- Church of Nuestra Sra. del Carmen (16th century)
- Ermita de la Vera Cruz (16th century)
- Hospital of Santa Brigida (16th century)
- Convent of San José y San Roque (1671). Also known as "Las Descalzas"

== Economy ==
The olives and white wine of Aguilar are celebrated in Spain, although the wine, which somewhat resembles sherry, is known as Montilla, from the adjacent town of that name. Salt springs exist in the neighborhood, and to the south there are two small lakes, Zoñar and Rincon, which abound in fish.

Up to 60% of the population is engaged in agricultural work at some time during the year, although agriculture accounts for only 30% of the economic activity.

== Twin towns ==
- Verneuil-sur-Seine, France

== See also ==
- List of Catholic dioceses in Spain, Andorra, Ceuta and Gibraltar
- List of municipalities in Córdoba

== Bibliography ==
- Fernández Cacho, Silvia; Fernández Salinas, Víctor; Hernández León, Elodia; López Martín, Esther; Quintero Morón, Victoria; Rodrigo Cámara, José María; Zarza Balluguera, Daniel (2010). "Campiña de Córdoba". Paisajes y patrimonio cultural en Andalucía. Tiempo, usos e imágenes (PDF). Vol. 1. Seville: Consejería de Cultura. ISBN 978-84-9959-024-0.

== Sources and external links ==
- Aguilar de la Frontera homepage
- Aguilar de la Frontera main page
- GCatholic - (titular) bishopric Ipagro
- Aguilar de la Frontera Statistics from the Multiterritorial Information System of Andalucía
- Economic Study of Spain - Aguilar de la Frontera
- Aguilar De La Frontera, Un Pueblo Emblemático by Diego Igeño Luque, 2005, Aires de Córdoba
