= Cabra, Spain =

Cabra
- Municipality
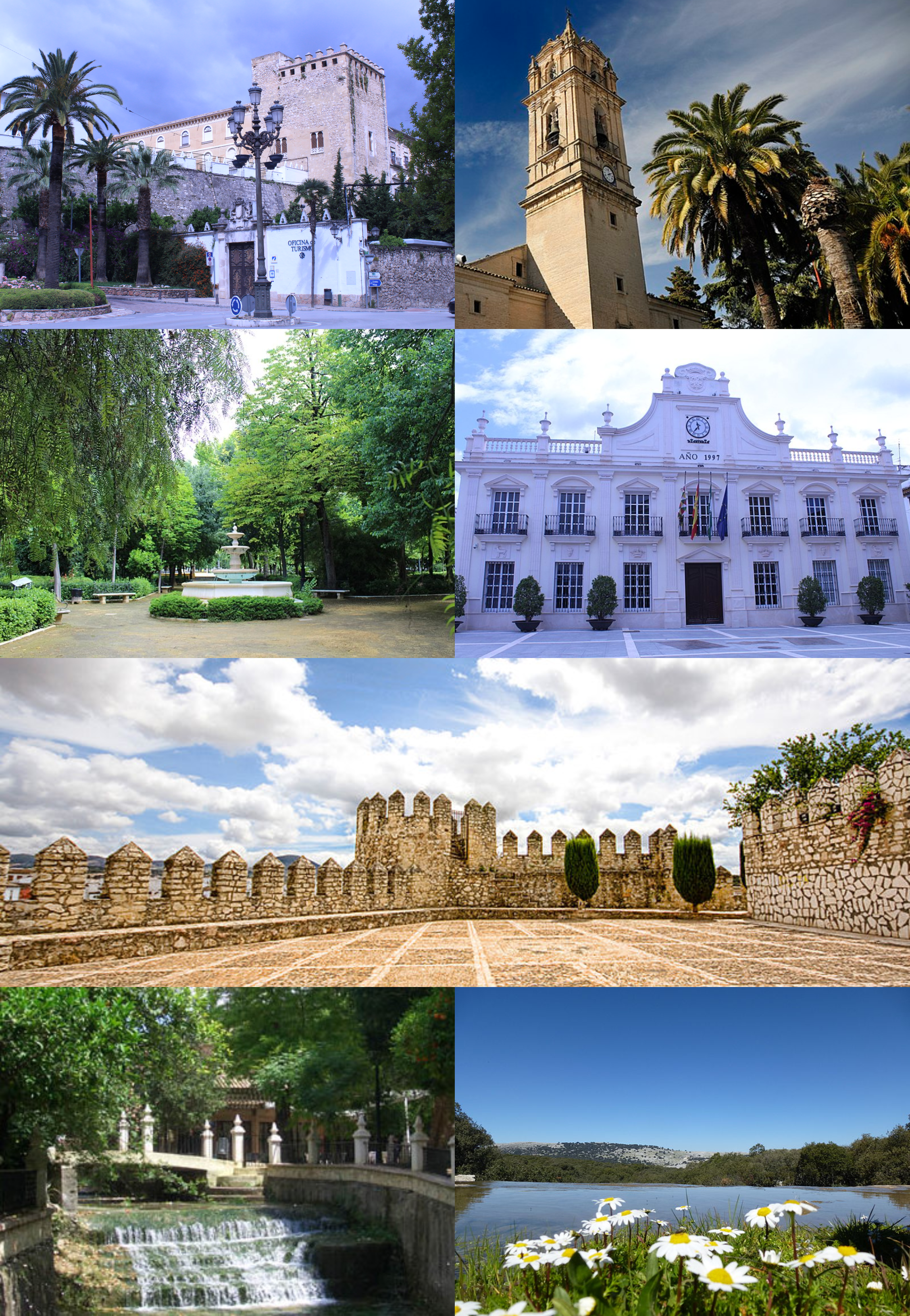
- Top (clockwise from left): Panoramic view of Cabra Castle (Castillo del Cabra), Cabra Assumption Church, Second:Alcántara Romero Park (Parque del Alcántara Romero), Cabra City Hall, Third:A defensive wall in Cabra Castle, Bottom: Fuente del Río (source of the Cabra River), Sierras Subbéticas Natural Park (Parque Natural de las Sierras Subbéticas)

- Flag Seal

- Location within Spain
- Coordinates: 37°28′23.9″N 4°26′33.1″W
- Country: Spain
- Community: Andalusia
- Province: Córdoba

Government
  - Mayor: Fernando Priego

Area
  - Total: 229.2 km^{2} (88.5 sq mi)

Population (January 1, 2021)
  - Total: 20,237
  - Density: 88.29/km^{2} (228.7/sq mi)
- Time zone: UTC+01:00 (CET)
- Postal code: 14940
- Area code: 14013
- Website: Official website

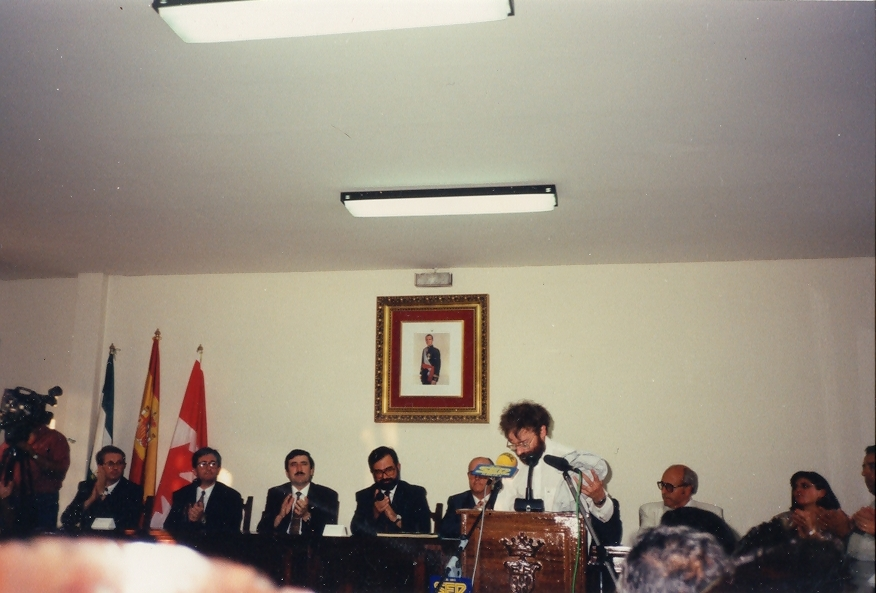
Twinning with Galiano Island, 1992

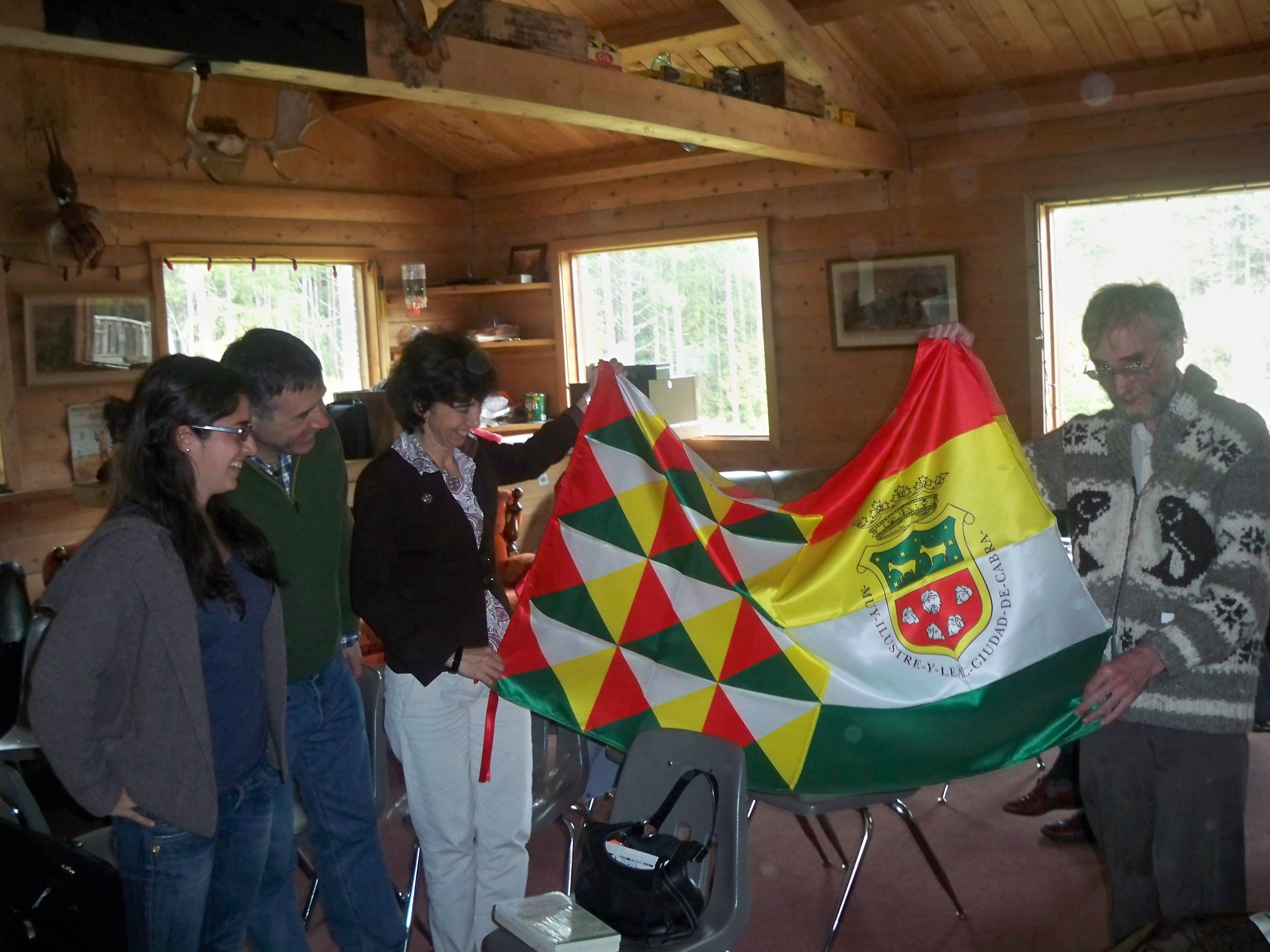
Almudena Alcalá-Galiano presents the flag of Cabra to Galiano Island

Cabra is a municipality in Córdoba province, Andalusia, Spain and the site of former bishopric Egabro. It lies along the route between Córdoba and Málaga in the south of Spain. It is an entrance point to the Parque Natural de las Sierras Subbéticas.

Although the main activity in Cabra is primary industry, it is noted as a source of red polished limestone. As a settlement, Cabra has existed over centuries, under many different rulers. In 2005, the municipality had a population of 20,940, most of whom (19,523) lived in Cabra township.

It is one of the White Towns of Andalusia.

== Geography ==
Cabra is located in the Province of Córdoba in the autonomous community of Andalusia in southern Spain. The municipality's mean altitude is 452 m (1,483 ft) and it covers 229 km^{2} (88 sq mi). The town is built in a valley between the Sierra de Cabra and the Sierra de Montilla, which together form the watershed between the rivers Cabra and Guadajoz. It has a population density of 91.4 inhabitants per km². The geographical mean coordinates are 37°28′N 4°27′W, 72 km (45 mi) from the province's capital, Córdoba.

The municipality is part of the Sierras Subbéticas Natural Park. Around Cabra, there are eight smaller villages, including Gaena, Las Huertas Bajas and La Benita. The area is known for its stone, called the red marble of Cabra (mármol rojo de Cabra) - albeit it is not a marble but a pink to red limestone capable of high polish.

== Etymology ==
Apparently Popular etymology from Latin Licabrum/ Egabro (via Arabic Qabra?), as the Spanish word Cabra (from Latin capra) means goat.

== History ==
The city of Cabra has been settled since Paleolithic times. The Turdetani, the Andalusian descendants of Tartessos, lived in the area. As part of the Tartessoian kingdom and during Carthaginian and Roman times, Cabra was a market town.

=== Licabrum ===
In the Roman era, the town was called Licabrum. In the 3rd century BC, Licabrum was involved in an uprising against the Roman Empire. Livy regarded Licabrum as a well-furnished and well-defended fort. The Roman general Gaius Flaminius besieged and conquered Licabrum. Its commander, Corribilo, was imprisoned. This is recorded in Livy's Ab Urbe Condita (City),

"et in utraque Hispania eo anno res prosperae gestae; nam et C. Flaminius oppidum Licabrum munitum opulem tumque uineis expugnauit et nobilem regulum Corribilonem uiuum cepit."

"and in their successful operations in both Spanish provinces this year: the town, Licabrum, was taken by storm; Gaius Flaminius, then feted, took several vineyards as spoil; and, the nobleman, Conribilo, was taken prisoner."

Pliny the Elder and Strabo referred to the many people and marvels of knowledge and wealth in Licabrum. The Greeks may have built a grand temple dedicated to the goddess Tyche which was then adopted by the Romans for the goddess, Fortuna. In addition, there was a temple dedicated to the Greek god, Apollo.

Cabra was the site of an aqueduct 5 miles (8.0 km) in length, which was constructed by Marco Cornelio Novano Bebio Balbo, the provincial flamen and Roman prefect of the college of engineers of Igabrum (a later name for Licabrum). At the source of the river Cabra, there is a reproduction of a plaque dedicated to this aqueduct.

On 17 March, 45 BC, the Battle of Munda took place near Igabrum. This was the last battle of the Second Civil War of the Republic of Rome between Julius Caesar and the Optimate supporters of Pompey. Igabrum was under the jurisdiction of the Astigitano convent, one of the four Roman provinces of Andalusia.

=== Christianity ===
In the 4th century AD, Igabrum embraced Christianity and became an episcopal centre. In the 600s, Sinagio, who assisted Juan, the Concilio Iliberitano, of the 3rd Reconcile of Toledo, Deodato, Bacanda, Gratino, and Constantino, lived there. The church of San Juan Bautista del Cerro was the central church and may have been constructed on the Roman Fortuna temple.

=== Visigoths ===
After the fall of the Roman Empire, the town, named Egabro, became a centre of Visigoth power for the surrounding area. It was a bishopric between the 6th and 8th centuries. It spanned the area from Lopera in the north to Benamejí or Antequera in the south, and to Puente Genil in the west.

=== Islam ===
After the Muslim conquest, the town was named Qabra and became the capital of the surrounding area, Cora. Bishops such as Recafredo and Reculfo preserved the Christian faith perhaps up to the invasion of the Almohades. In 889 AD, Christians in Moorish Spain, including Cabra, under Samuel (Omar ibn Hafsún) rebelled against Muslim rule. Samuel regained control of Spain as far as Córdoba. He was defeated at Poley (Aguilar de la Frontera). Samuel and his son ruled their land from Bobastro, until Abderramán III forced them into exile in 928.

=== Battle of Cabra ===
In 1031, the Caliphate of Cordova fell. Cabra came under the control of Granada. Under Alfonso the VIth, Granada and Seville were feudatories of Castile. In 1079, the Battle of Cabra took place. Rodrigo Díaz de Vivar (El Cid), with the Castilian troops of Alfonso the VIth, fought on the side of the Sevillian king Al-Mu'tamid ibn Abbad against Granada. El Cid conquered the ruler of Granada Abdallah and his ally García Ordóñez. El Cid fell out of favour with Alfonso VI.

=== Almoravids ===
Abdallah of Granada, together with the rulers of Seville and Badajoz, pressed for the end of the parias and requested the aid of the Almoravids. The North Africans entered the Iberian peninsula in 1086, defeating Alfonso VI in the Battle of Sagrajas near Badajoz. Cabra was conquered by the Almoravids in 1090. Around 1124, King Alfonso I of Aragon attacked Andalusia, crossing Alcalá la Real, Luque, Baena, Écija, Cabra and Lucena. On 10 March 1126, in Arnisol, Alfonso I of Aragon defeated Abu Bakr, son of the Emir Ali ibn Yusuf. Christians living in Andalus who did not flee to Aragon were punished severely in reprisals and deported to Morocco. In 1148, the region was invaded by the North African almohades.

=== Medieval era ===
In 1217, Fernando III inherited the Kingdom of Castile from his mother, Doña Berenguela, and in 1230, the Kingdom of León from his father, Alfonso the IXth. In 1240, Fernando III peacefully re-conquered Cabra, where the inhabitants shared his customs and religion. Fernando III increased Cabra's area to include the majority of Andalusia which was under the control of his step-brother, Rodrigo Alfonso de León. The parliaments of León and Castile merged under the reign of Fernando III, marking the rise of the Crown of Castile. León, Toledo, Jaen, parts of Andalusia, and the conquered Arab dominions became the Kingdom of Castile. From the Order of Calatrava, the control of Cabra passed through a number of lords.

In 1333, Cabra was besieged by the King of Granada, who, after knocking down the castle and its walls, imprisoned the population. Between 1342 and 1344, after his rescue of Carba, Alfonso XI ordered that the Master of Cabra re-populate the area. In 1344, the land of Cabra was given to Lady Eleanor de Guzmán. Alfonso XI's edict read,

"to ennoble the village of Cabra which belongs to Doña Leonor, in order to better populate..."

and gave Cabra additional franchises and liberties, among which was the granting of Cordoba jurisdiction and exemptions from the martiniega tax.

Eleanor de Guzmán's son, Enrique II of Castile, was born in Cabra, and was baptised king in the church of San Juan Bautista del Cerro. In 1380, the title Count of Cabra was inherited by his son, Enrique de Castilla y Sousa, (Duke of Medina Sidonia). After this Count of Cabra's death, the title reverted to the crown.

In 1439, the King Juan II of Castile appointed Don Diego Fernandez de Cordoba and Montemayor the Lord of Cabra, and in 1455, Enrique IV of Castile was appointed Count of Cabra. During this time, there was frequent infighting between the feudal lords of the Kingdom of Castile. For example, Don Diego Fernandez de Cordoba and Montemayor captured his cousin, Don Gonzalo Fernández de Córdoba and Aguilar, and imprisoned him in Cabra castle. Don Gonzalo was released in 1476 through the intercession of Ferdinand and Isabella.

In 1483, at the Battle of Martin Gonzalez (Lucena), the second Count of Cabra, Don Diego Fernández de Córdoba y Carrillo de Albornoz, defeated the last King of Granada, Boabdil el Chico ( a Moor), who was then imprisoned in Cabra castle. Ferdinand and Isabella allowed those who had supported them in this battle to add an image (a barracks symbol) which depicted a chained King Boabdil el Chico to their shields.

In 1522, a brotherhood of the True Cross, a formal religious order whose tradition was the practice of self-flagellation, formed in Cabra.

== Spanish Civil War ==
On 7 November 1938, during the Spanish Civil War, Cabra was bombed by Republican planes. Cabra was not a strategic objective as the front lines were at a distance. The official figures were 101 dead and over 200 injured.

== Economy ==
Cabra main industry is agriculture. Up to 45% of the population work in and over 85% of the land is involved in primary industry. Cabra's key products are olives, olive oil, grapes, and wine.

The industrial sector occupies approximately 30% of the population and produces textiles, fabricated metal, and furniture. The remainder of the Cabran population is employed in service industries and tourism. A regional hospital serves the southern part of the Córdoba province.

Don Luis Aguilar y Eslava donated property to allow the foundation of the Royal College of the Immaculate Conception of Cabra. Over time, this school of humanities, now called IES Aguilar y Eslava, has grown in importance as a place of learning in Andalusia.

== Governance ==
In the 2004 Spanish General Election, the Partido Socialista Obrero Español received 49.05% of the vote in Cabra, the Partido Popular, 29.04%, the Partido Andalucista, 14.07% and Izquierda Unida, 5.17%.

From 2007 to 2011, the Mayor of Cabra was María Dolores Villatoro Carnerero, of the Partido Socialista Obrero Español. Carnerero's party governed in coalition with Izquierda Unida. Her party had 6 municipal councillors in the town's ayuntamiento, the Partido Andalucista had 6, Izquierda Unida, 5 and the Partido Popular, 4.

In 2011, Fernando Priego of the Partido Popular became the mayor of Cabra.

== Places of interest ==
- Church of the Asuncion, a Baroque church at the hill top square with a rococo south door and 42 Marble columns (possibly from an Islamic mosque).
- Birthplace of author Juan Valera (1824-1905).
- Birthplace of Mukkadam of Cabra, also written, Muqaddam ibn Muafa, Mocadem of Cabra and Mocadem bin Moafa, an early 10th century poet of muwassaha verse and composer of early Spanish music.
- Church of San Juan Bautista, a Visigoth church of 590 A.D.
- Quarries near Cabra produced marble stone for Cordoba in the times of the Visigoths and the Muslims.
- Cavern of Cabra, a geological feature near the town, referred to in various literary works: Los doze triumphos de los doze apostoles, Juan de Padilla; El diablo cojuelo, Luis Velez de Guevara; Don Quixote, and El celoso extremeño, Miguel de Cervantes.

== See also ==
- List of municipalities in Córdoba

== Sources and external links ==
- Tourist portal for the City council of Cabra
- Cabra statistics from the Multiterritorial Information System of Andalusia
- Map of Cabra, Andalusia, Spain from GoogleMap
- War of Independence in Cabra
- GCatholic
