= Almendricos =

- Interactive map of Almendricos
- Coordinates: 37°28′21″N 1°46′34″W
- Country: Spain
- Province: Murcia
- Municipality: Lorca

Population (2010)
  - Total: 1,855

Almendricos (El Empalme de Almedricos) is a Spanish village in Murcia, Spain. It is part of the municipality of Lorca. It is located in Alto Guadalentin region, along the border of the province of Almeria.

The town is known for its agricultural heritage, archaeological sites, and natural surroundings.

In 2006 the Plataforma Pro-Segregacion de Almendricos was created, which aims to segregate itself from the municipality of Lorca.

== History ==
The first evidence of population in Almendricos dates back to the Argaric Culture which was located in the southeast Iberian Peninsula, around the years 2200 - 1550 BCE.
