= Battle of Cutanda =

Battle in year 1120 Cutanda, Spain

Coordinates: 40°56′10″N 1°11′06″W

- Part of Reconquista
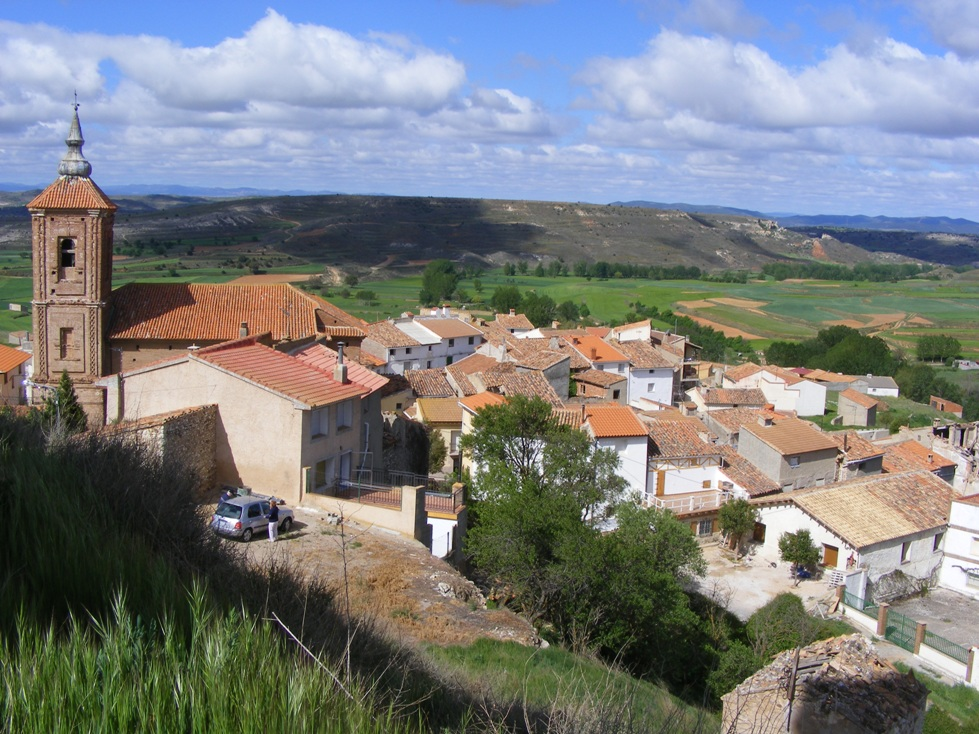
- Cutanda
Date	June 17, 1120
Location	Cutanda, near Calamocha
Result	Christian victory
Territorial changes	Calatayud and Daroca surrendered

Belligerents
Kingdom of Aragon; Duchy of Aquitaine	Almoravids

Commanders and leaders
Alfonso I of Aragon; Abd al-Malik Imad ad-Dawla; William IX of Aquitaine	Ibrahim ibn Yusuf †

Strength
About 1,200 horsemen	5,000 horsemen 10,000 infantry (exaggerated)

Casualties and losses
Unknown	15,000 killed or wounded 2,000 camels captured (exaggerated)

The Battle of Cutanda took place on 17 June 1120 between the forces of Alfonso the Battler and an Almoravid army led by Ibrahim ibn Yusuf occurring at a place called Cutanda, near Calamocha (Teruel). In the battle, Christian forces composed primarily of military from Aragon and Navarre routed the Almoravid force.

== Background ==
After Alfonso the Battler conquered the city of Zaragoza of 1118, he continued his campaign against the Almoravids in the former Taifa of Zaragoza. In May 1120, Alfonso in conjunction with the Duke of Aquitaine initiated the siege of Calatayud, the second largest city in Zaragoza. In addition, Alfonso's forces advanced to the south along a tributary of the Jalón River and put the fortified city of Daroca under siege. Upon hearing that an Almoravid relief army under the command of Ibrahim ibn Yusuf was advancing toward Calatayud, Alfonso and the Duke of Aquitaine took the preponderance of their forces and set out to intercept the Muslim force.

== The battle ==
Advancing northward through the Jiloca River valley toward Daroca, the Muslim army included contingents from Sevilla, Murcia, and Lérida. It has been estimated that the army included 5,000 horseback knights and 10,000 foot soldiers. It is believed that Alfonso was aware of their approach, knowledgeable of the terrain, and prepared accordingly. Prior to the battle, Alfonso's army was also joined by soldiers from the former ibn-Hūd ruler of Zaragoza increasing the total size of the force to as many as 15,000 men.

The armies ultimately met on 17 June at a place known as Cutanda where the battle ensued. It is believed that the Christian force surprised the Almoravid army as the result was a “complete rout.” The Almoravid army was destroyed and their general, Ibrahim, killed. Also killed among the Almoravids was the scholar Abu Ali al-Sadafi.

== Aftermath ==
With no further hope of reinforcements, both Calatayud and Daroca surrendered as Alfonso continued his campaign in Zaragoza.

== Citations ==
- Juste, Alberto Cañada (1997). La Batalla de Cutanda (1120) (PDF). Xiloca nº 20.
- Lafuente, José Luis Corral (20 July 2020). "Alfonso I el Batallador y la conquista de Calatayud" (PDF). Institución Fernando el Católico (in Spanish). University of Zaragoza.
- O'Callaghan, Joseph F. (12 November 2013). A History of Medieval Spain. Cornell University Press. ISBN 978-0-8014-6871-1.
- Reilly, Bernard F. (1992). The Contest of Christian and Muslim Spain: 1031-1157. Cambridge: Blackwell. ISBN 0-631-16913-X.
- Verdon, Jean (1979). La chronique de Saint-Maixent (751-1140). Paris: Société d'édition les Belles lettres.
