= Conquest of Zaragoza (1118) =

Conquest of Zaragoza by Alfonso I in 1118

- Part of the Reconquista
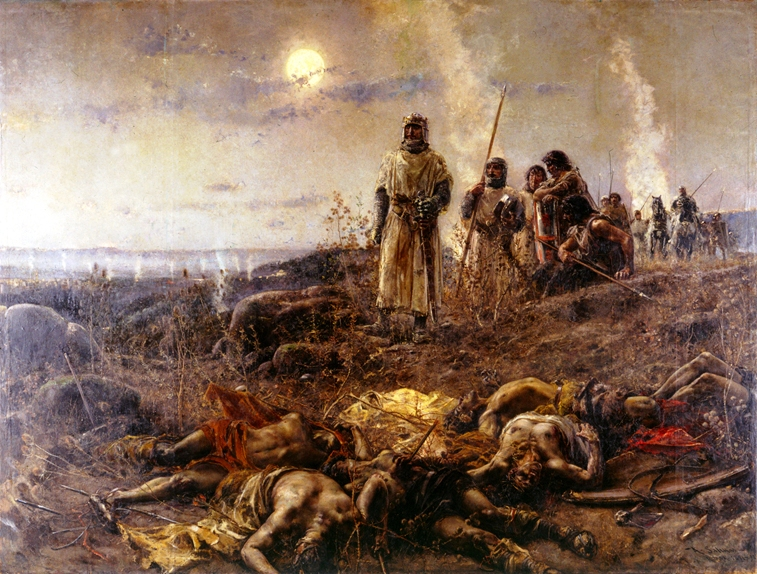
- Conquest of Zaragoza
| Date | May – 18 December 1118 |
| Location | Zaragoza |
| Result | Christian victory |

Belligerents
| Kingdom of Aragon; Kingdom of Navarre; Viscounty of Béarn | Almoravid dynasty |

Commanders and leaders
| Alfonso the Battler; Gaston IV; Centule II | Ali ibn Yusuf |

Strength
| Unknown | Unknown |

The Conquest of Zaragoza of 1118 was a military operation led by Alfonso the Battler, King of Aragón and Pamplona, who successfully besieged and captured the city of Zaragoza from the Almoravids.

== History ==
The city of Zaragoza, which had once been the capital of the Taifa of Zaragoza, had about 25,000 inhabitants counting its periphery. It had been previously besieged by Alfonso VI of León in 1086, by Sancho Ramírez in 1091, and by Alfonso the Battler himself in 1110. The siege began in May 1118. In addition to the Argonese and the Navarrese, the attacking contingent also included the French, Castilians, and Catalans. The siege was also joined by such nobles as Gastón de Béarn and his half-brother Centule II, Count of Bigorre. The monk Pedro de Librana carried the indulgence papal, granted by the pontiff Gelasius II in December 1118.

The small defending Almoravid garrison, which lacked a leader after the death of Governor Ibn Tifilwit in 1116, received external support from troops commanded by the Granada governor Abd Allah. ibn Mazdali, who died on November 16, demoralizing the defending troops. The Almoravids capitulated on December 11, 1118, and the Christian troops triumphantly entered the city on the 18th of that month. Despite the abundant siege weapons arranged by the army of Alfonso during the siege, the capitulation of the city seemed to have been due more so to the hunger suffered by the besieged. The Christians also suffered from hunger during the siege.

After the conquest of Zaragoza, Alfonso continued the military campaign capturing Tudela and Tarazona the following year. As a result of capturing the city of Zaragoza, the fortified city of Jaca would lose importance in the years that followed.

== Bibliography ==
- Corbera, Laliena (2005). Frontier and feudal conquest in the Ebro valley from a local perspective (Tauste, Zaragoza, 1086-1200). Salamanca: Universidad de Salamanca. pp. 115–138. ISSN 0213-2060.
- Guichard, Pierre (2001). Al-Andalus facing the Christian conquest: the Muslims of Valencia, centuries. Madrid and Valencia: New Library; University of Valencia. ISBN 84-7030-852-1.
- Montserrat, Grau (1958). "Contribution to the study of the cultural state of the Ebro valley in the 11th century and early 12th century". Barcelona: Bulletin of the Royal Academy of Good Letters of Barcelona. ISSN 2340-3241.
- Mouton, García (1980). "The French in Aragon" (PDF). Zaragoza: Archive of Aragonese philology. pp. 7–98. ISSN 0210-5624.
- Stalls (1995). Possessing the Land: Aragon's Expansion Into Islam's Ebro Frontier Under Alfonso the Battler, 1104-1134. Leiden, New York and Cologne: The Medieval Mediterranean. ISBN 90-04-10367-8. ISSN 0928-5520.
