= Cabra (river) =

River in Asturias, Spain

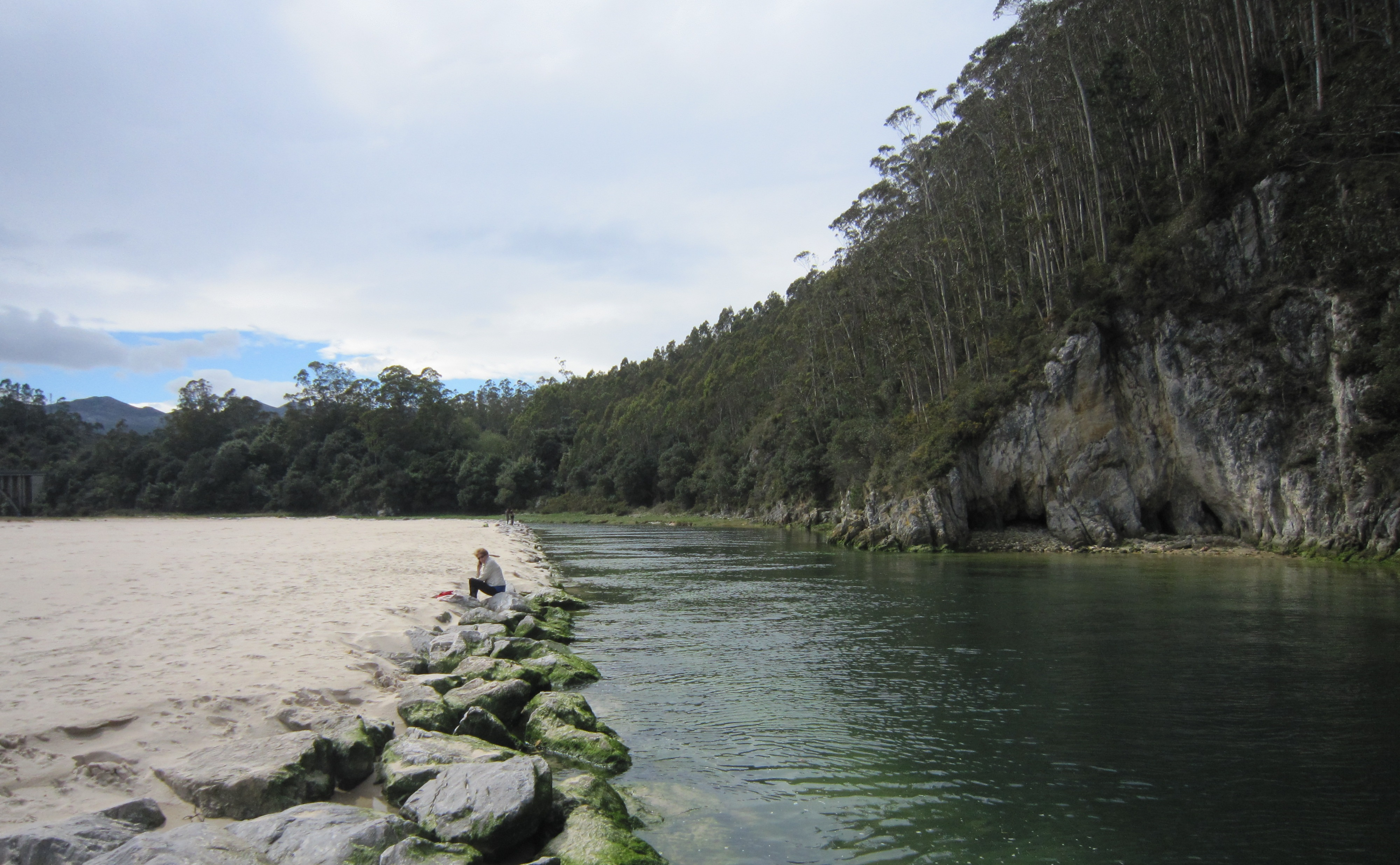
- River mouth between Llanes and Ribadedeva

Location
- Country: Spain
- State: Asturias
- Region: Llanes; Ribadedeva

Physical characteristics
- Mouth: Ría de Santiuste
  - location: Llanes, Ribadedeva
  - coordinates: 43°23′12″N 4°30′44″W
  - elevation: 0 m (0 ft)
- Length: 5 km (3.1 mi)
- Basin size: 26.11 km^{2} (10.08 sq mi)

The Cabra is a river in northern Spain flowing through the Autonomous Community of Asturias.

- Beginning: Pico Arenas, on the border between the municipalities of Llanes and Ribadedeva.
- River mouth: Bay of Biscay, in the Playa de la Franca.
- Length: Less than 5 kilometres (3 mi).
- Major tributaries, rivers of Ubrade, the Garn and Aíjo.
- Towns going through: The Borbolla, Bojes.
