= Daroca =

- Municipality
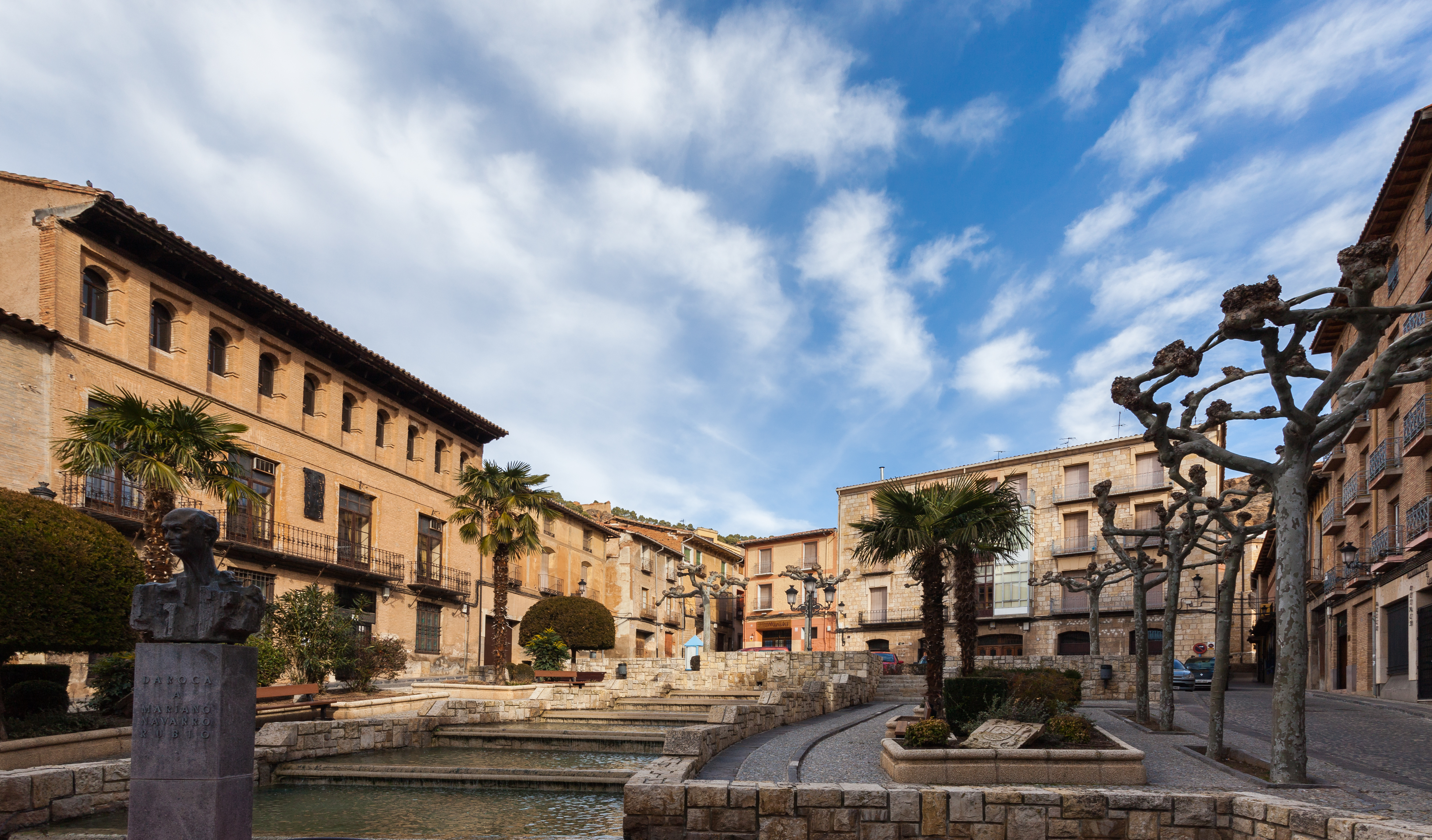

- Flag Coat of arms

- Location within Aragon Location within Spain Location within Europe
- Coordinates: 41°6′55″N 1°24′50″W
- Country: Spain
- Autonomous community: Aragon
- Province: Zaragoza
- Comarca: Campo de Daroca

Government
  - Mayor: Miguel García Cortés (2011-?)

Area
  - Total: 52.05 km^{2} (20.10 sq mi)
- Elevation: 782 m (2,566 ft)

Population (2025-01-01)
  - Total: 1,899
  - Density: 36.48/km^{2} (94.49/sq mi)
- Demonym: Darocenses
- Time zone: UTC+1 (CET)
  - Summer (DST): UTC+2 (CEST)
- Postal code: 50360

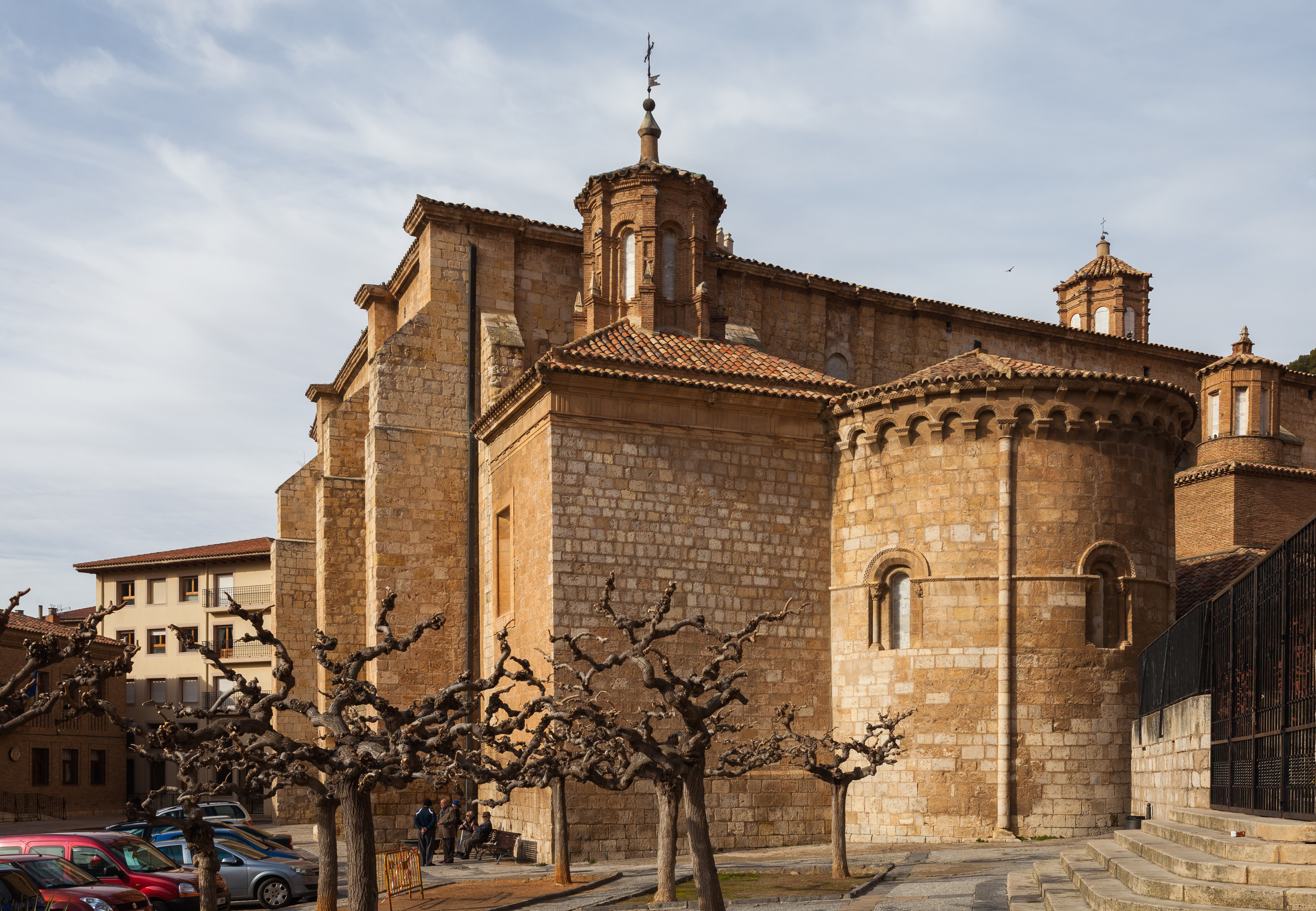
St Mary's collegiate church

Daroca is a city and municipality in the province of Zaragoza, Aragon, Spain, situated to the south of the city of Zaragoza. It is the center of a judicial district.

It is located in the basin of Calatayud, in the valley of the Jiloca river. N-234 highway passes through Daroca.

== History ==
According to certain writers, the primitive Celtiberian village in this location was named Darek. The Romans named it Agiria, building a strong castle to defend the Laminium road, which passed through the village and connected Zaragoza with Valencia.

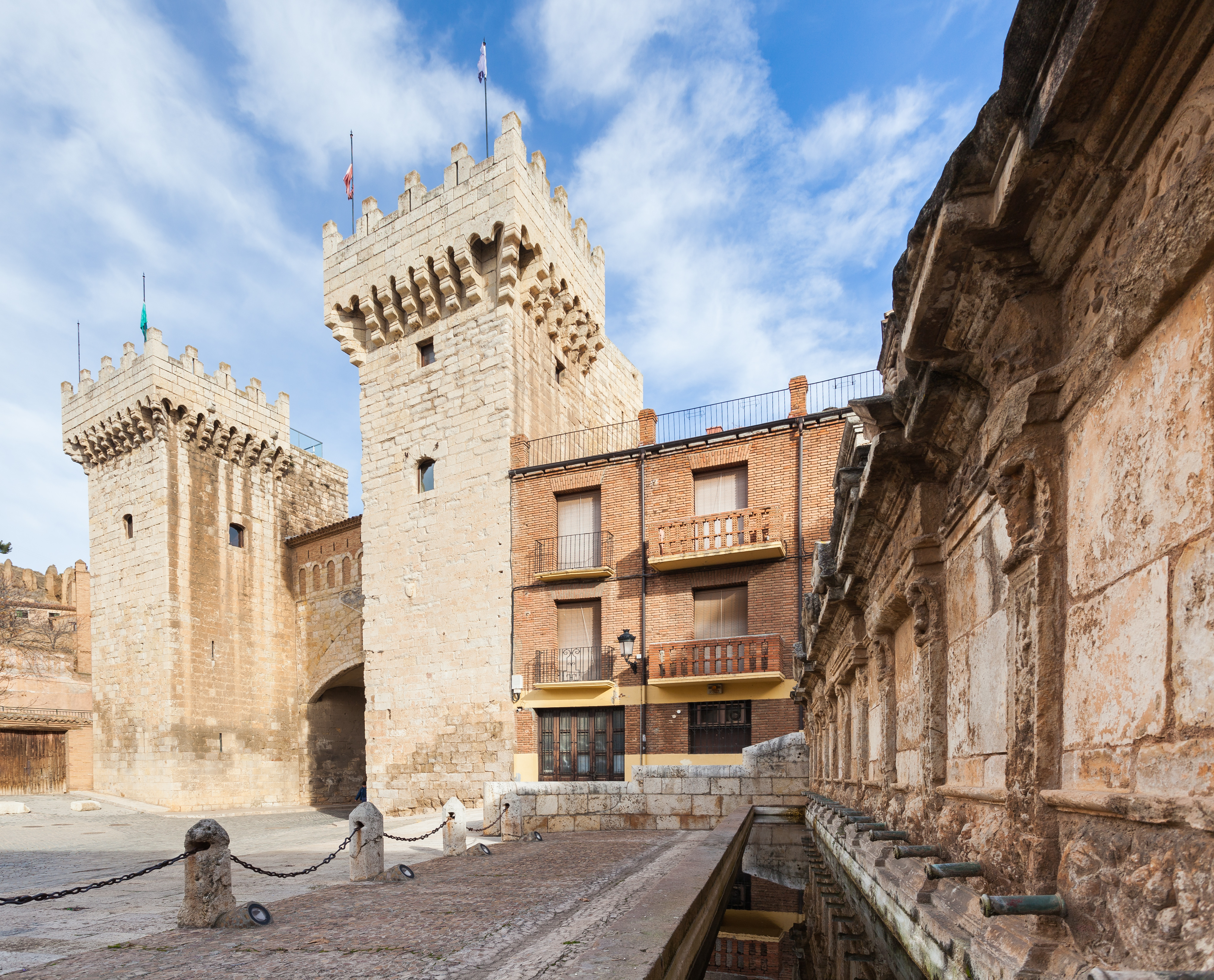
Puerta Baja.

The Arabs gave it the name Calat-Darawca (862), and possessed it for 400 years, until Alfonso the Battler conquered it in 1120, and in 1141 issued a primitive legal code, which is unknown today. In the 12th century, Ramon Berenguer IV gave it the laws and privileges which made it the capital of the Community of Daroca, which had a great social and military influence in the Middle Ages. It had a vote in courts and was the site of several famous assemblies: 1196 (Peter II), 1222-1243 (James I), 1311 (James II), and 1338 (Peter IV), in which peace was arranged with Castile. In a war against Peter of Castile, Daroca resisted a siege, which led to the awarding of the status of city on 26 April 1366.

City life was ruled by the council, whose principal members were the justice, judge, jurors, almutazaf, scribes, major-domos, and other minor officials. The terms for municipal offices lasted one year, and they were elected by the council. The justice was appointed by the king from a set of three candidates chosen by the council, and the judge and jurors were chosen by the king directly. All of this occurred on 1 January. Economically, agriculture and livestock were the principal occupations of the inhabitants. There were three social groups, Christians, Jews, and Muslims, which enjoyed the same laws and privileges, although they were organized separately.

The city served as a frequent stop for journeys to places in the area, and was visited by the Catholic Monarchs, Charles I, Philip II, and Philip III, on his route from Madrid to Zaragoza and Catalonia. Philip V also was in Daroca and so was his rival to the throne, Charles II. After the death of Charles II, Daroca embraced the cause of the Austrian pretender to the throne, Charles III, instead of the French-backed candidate Philip, duke of Anjou, which led to the occupation and sacking of the city in the War of Spanish Succession.

This ended almost six centuries of municipal autonomy: the office of the justice disappeared, and was substituted for a royal magistrate; the council was reorganized to remove the jurors and add eight regents, a secretary, and two joint deputies. During the Peninsular War, Napoleon's troops entered Daroca in June 1808, destroying a good part of the Dominican convent, and returned periodically to control the city and attack the resistance; later the French left a permanent garrison. Daroca was liberated in August 1813. France had taken Ferdinand VII of Spain prisoner, and when he returned in 1814, he stayed in Daroca, and communicated a new constitution.

During the Carlist Wars of the 19th century, it was occupied by the Carlist forces in 1834, 1837, and 1872, but all of these were sporadic because Daroca remained loyal to the monarchy of Isabel II. The occupations were due to the geographical proximity of the Carlist redoubt of Maestrazgo.

From the middle of the nineteenth century, the economic situation improved due to successful agriculture, which spurred the development of commerce and small industry. At the beginning of the twentieth century, the Teruel-Calatayud railway was built, which strengthened the commercial position of Daroca. In these years, embankments were built in the Jiloca gorge and there was reforestation in an attempt to avoid the disasters caused by periodic flooding. Afterwards the city began to decline, although it kept its position thanks to the industrialization and the mechanization of the field. However, it was not able to adapt to the new times and the markets began to disappear. Today there is an attempt to revitalize commerce and potentially tourism, but agriculture is suffering a difficult reversal, because there are no young people in the area to carry on the traditional viticulture and horticulture, and the fields are filling with forest plants.

== Main sights ==
- The Wall of Daroca, which has more than 4 km of medieval walls
- Gates: Puerta Baja, Puerta Alta, Portal de Valencia and Arrabal
- Church of San Miguel.
- Church of San Juan.
- Church of Santo Domingo.
- Basilica of Santa María de los Sagrados Corporales, associated with a Eucharistic miracle dated to 1239
- Fountain of the twenty pipes

== Climate ==
The climate in Daroca is cold semi-arid (BSk) bordering on a humid subtropical climate (Cfa) under the Köppen classification. It has an oceanic with hot summer and cool winter (Doak) under the Trewartha classification. This type of climate is common in inland Spain, with low annual rainfall and high summer sunshine. Summers are hot, but tempered by elevation. Winters are mild for the elevation and latitude, although cool by Spanish standards.

Climate data for Daroca, 779 metres (2,556 ft) above sea level (1991–2020), extremes (1920-present)
Month	Jan	Feb	Mar	Apr	May	Jun	Jul	Aug	Sep	Oct	Nov	Dec	Year
Record high °C (°F)	21.3 (70.3)	27.0 (80.6)	28.0 (82.4)	32.7 (90.9)	36.2 (97.2)	40.7 (105.3)	40.5 (104.9)	41.0 (105.8)	38.6 (101.5)	33.8 (92.8)	25.3 (77.5)	20.0 (68.0)	41.0 (105.8)
Mean daily maximum °C (°F)	10.1 (50.2)	12.0 (53.6)	15.5 (59.9)	17.8 (64.0)	22.3 (72.1)	27.7 (81.9)	31.2 (88.2)	31.1 (88.0)	25.9 (78.6)	20.4 (68.7)	13.8 (56.8)	10.5 (50.9)	19.9 (67.7)
Daily mean °C (°F)	4.8 (40.6)	5.9 (42.6)	8.9 (48.0)	11.2 (52.2)	15.5 (59.9)	20.2 (68.4)	23.2 (73.8)	23.2 (73.8)	18.6 (65.5)	14.0 (57.2)	8.4 (47.1)	5.4 (41.7)	13.3 (55.9)
Mean daily minimum °C (°F)	−0.5 (31.1)	−0.1 (31.8)	2.2 (36.0)	4.6 (40.3)	8.6 (47.5)	12.6 (54.7)	15.2 (59.4)	15.4 (59.7)	11.4 (52.5)	7.6 (45.7)	3.0 (37.4)	0.2 (32.4)	6.7 (44.0)
Record low °C (°F)	−21.2 (−6.2)	−18.6 (−1.5)	−12.7 (9.1)	−5.7 (21.7)	−2.3 (27.9)	1.8 (35.2)	5.2 (41.4)	3.8 (38.8)	−2.3 (27.9)	−3.7 (25.3)	−11.4 (11.5)	−22.4 (−8.3)	−22.4 (−8.3)
Average precipitation mm (inches)	21.8 (0.86)	22.0 (0.87)	29.0 (1.14)	47.5 (1.87)	51.4 (2.02)	46.1 (1.81)	22.0 (0.87)	22.8 (0.90)	34.1 (1.34)	38.1 (1.50)	37.0 (1.46)	23.9 (0.94)	395.7 (15.58)
Average rainy days	4.7	4.4	5.7	7.4	7.6	6.0	3.0	3.3	4.3	5.8	6.1	5.0	63.3
Average snowy days	2.4	3.1	1.8	1.1	0	0	0	0	0	0.1	1.0	1.6	11.1
Average relative humidity (%)	74	67	62	60	56	50	44	48	56	64	72	75	61
Mean monthly sunshine hours	130	158	205	219	260	303	347	319	243	192	135	115	2,626
Source: Agencia Estatal de Meteorología

== Events ==
- Festival of Antique Music (August).
- Corpus (May–June).
- San Cristóbal (10 July).
- Medieval Market (Last weekend of July)

== Twin towns ==
- Pouillon, France

== See also ==
- List of municipalities in Zaragoza
